= List of Joe Biden 2020 presidential campaign celebrity endorsements =

This is a list of notable entertainment and sports figures who endorsed Joe Biden's campaign for President of the United States in the 2020 U.S. presidential election.

== Actors and actresses ==
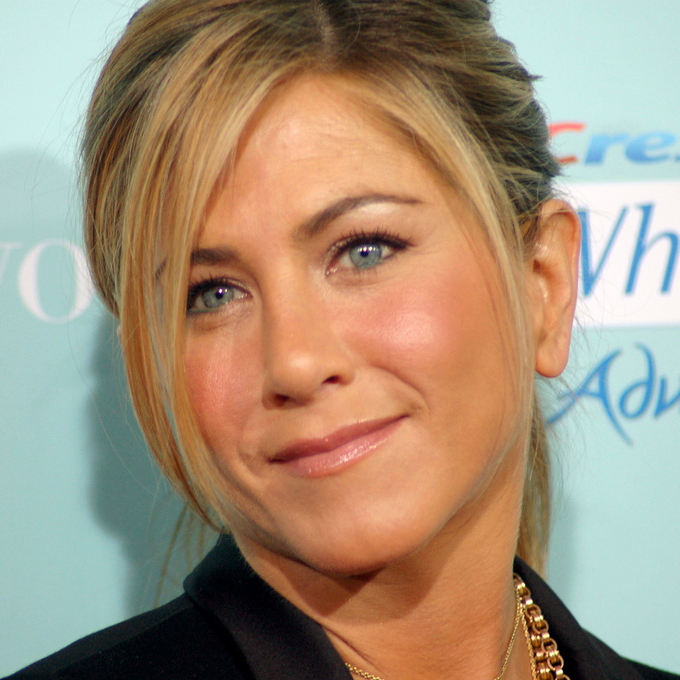
Jennifer Aniston

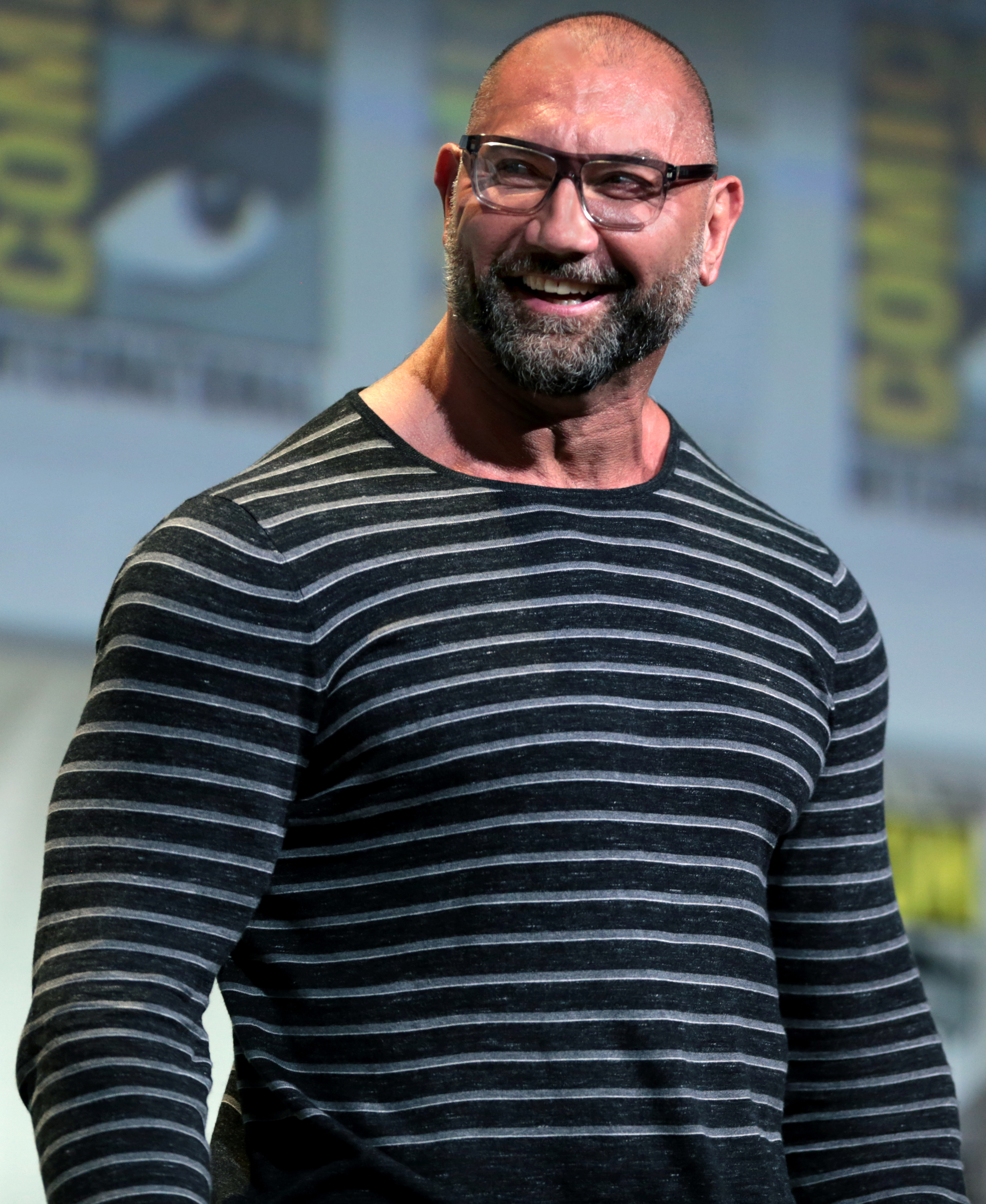
Dave Bautista

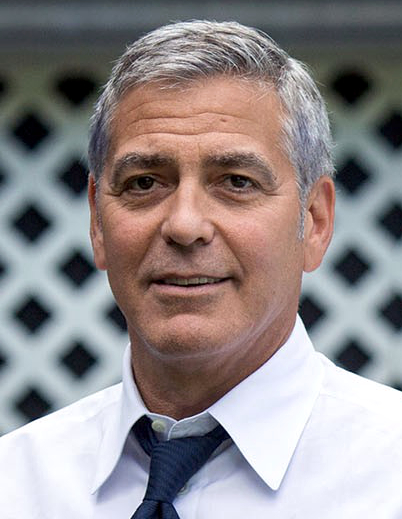
George Clooney

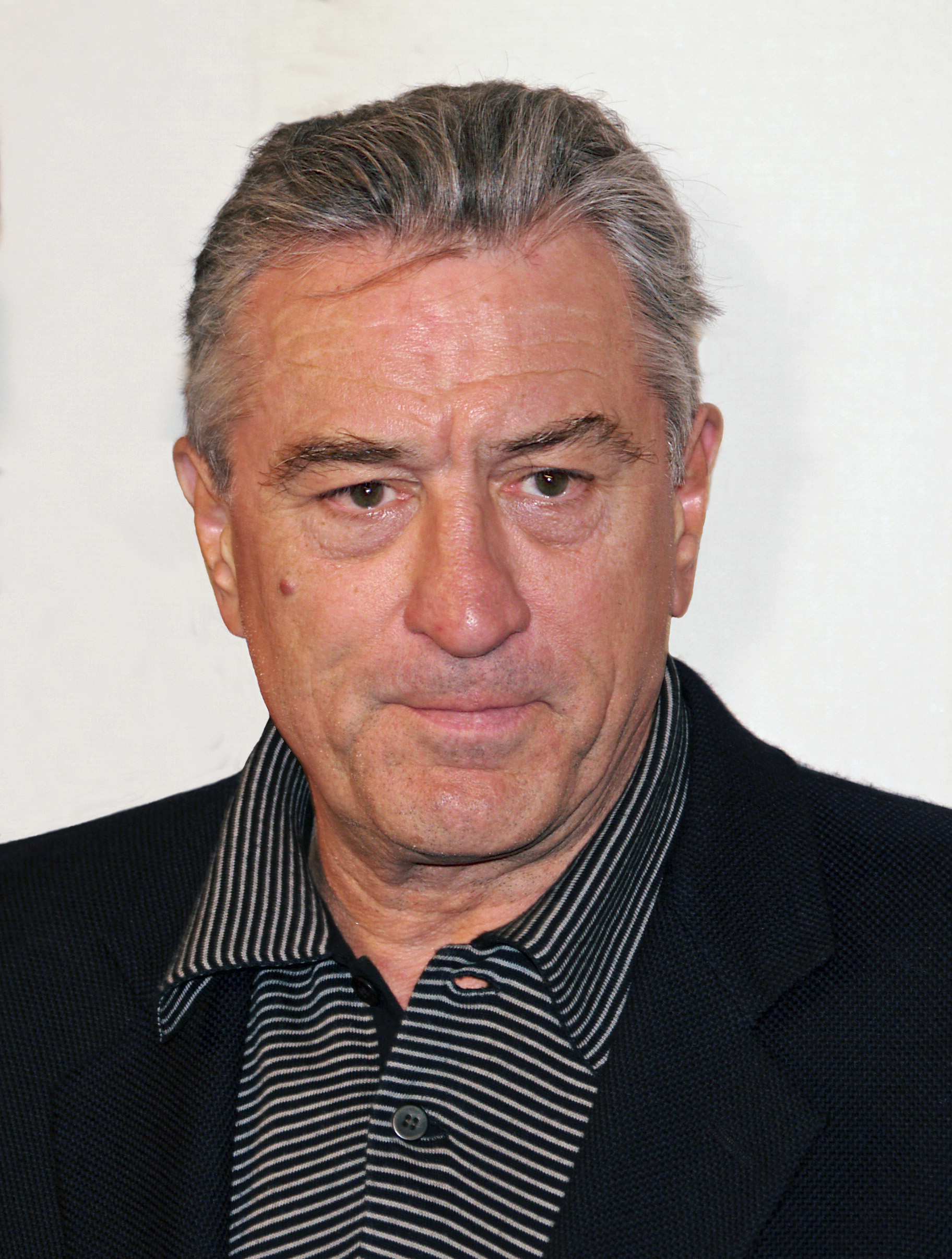
Robert De Niro

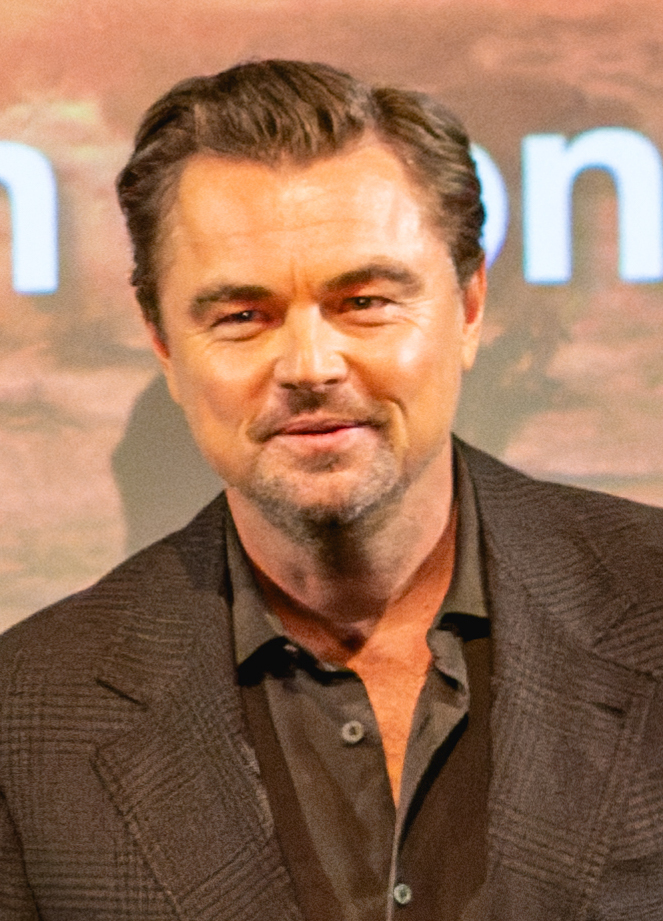
Leonardo DiCaprio

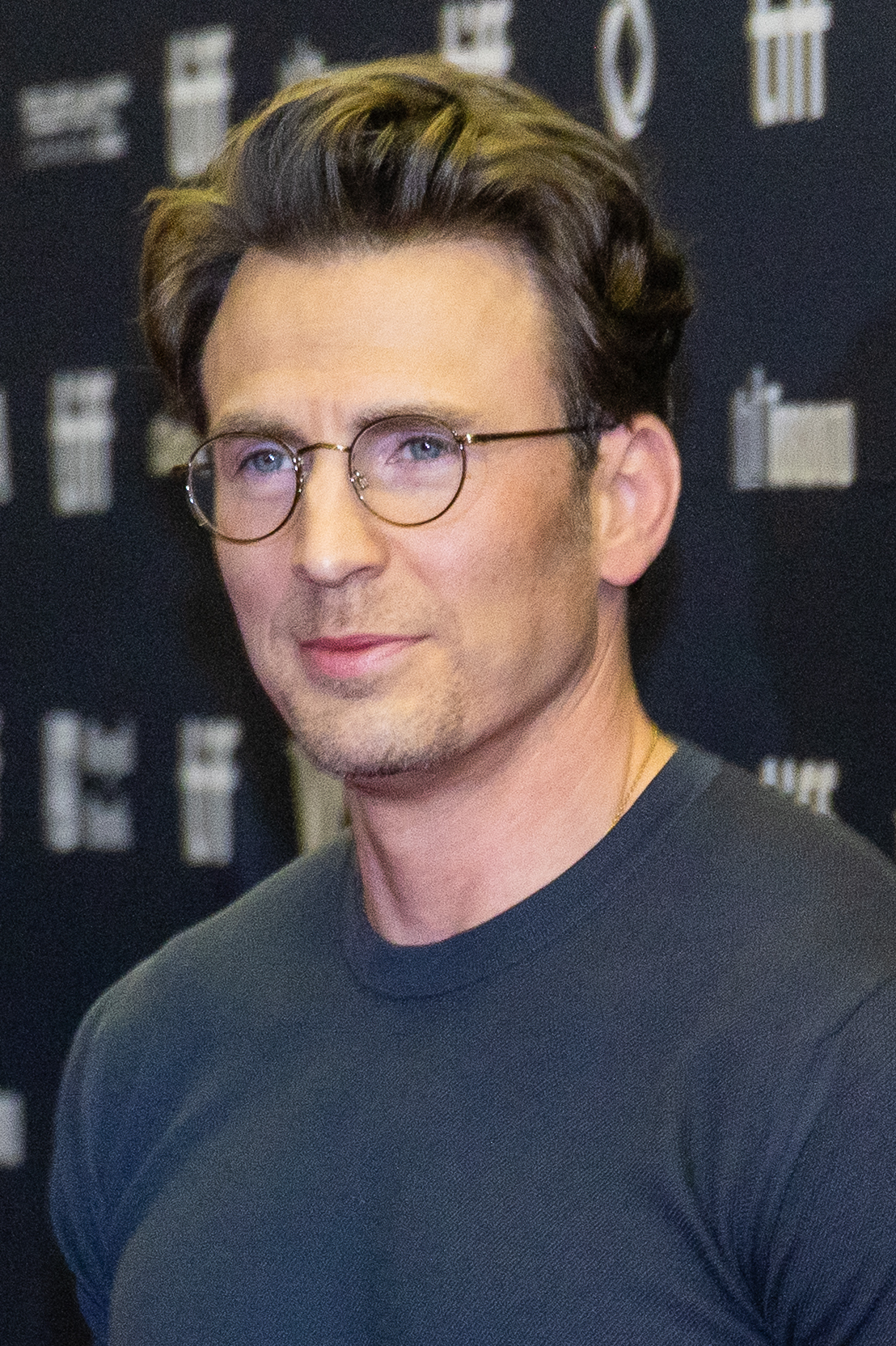
Chris Evans

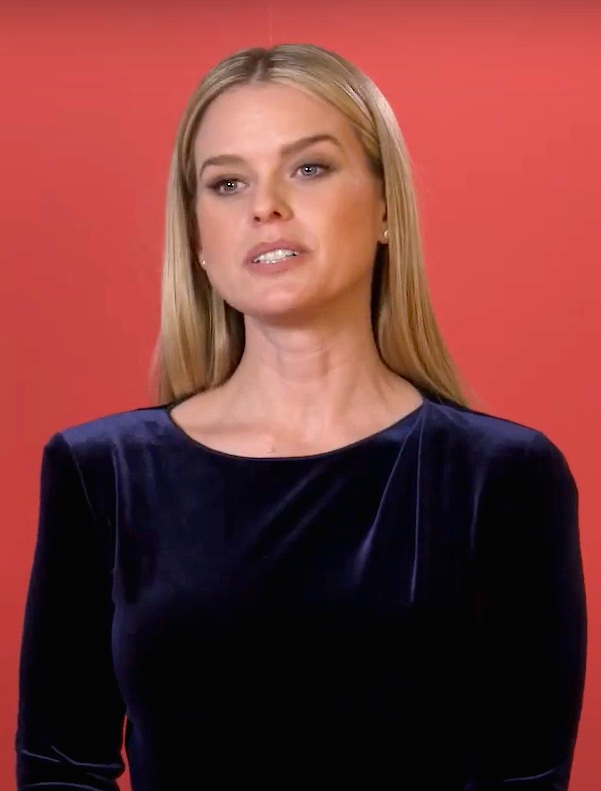
Alice Eve

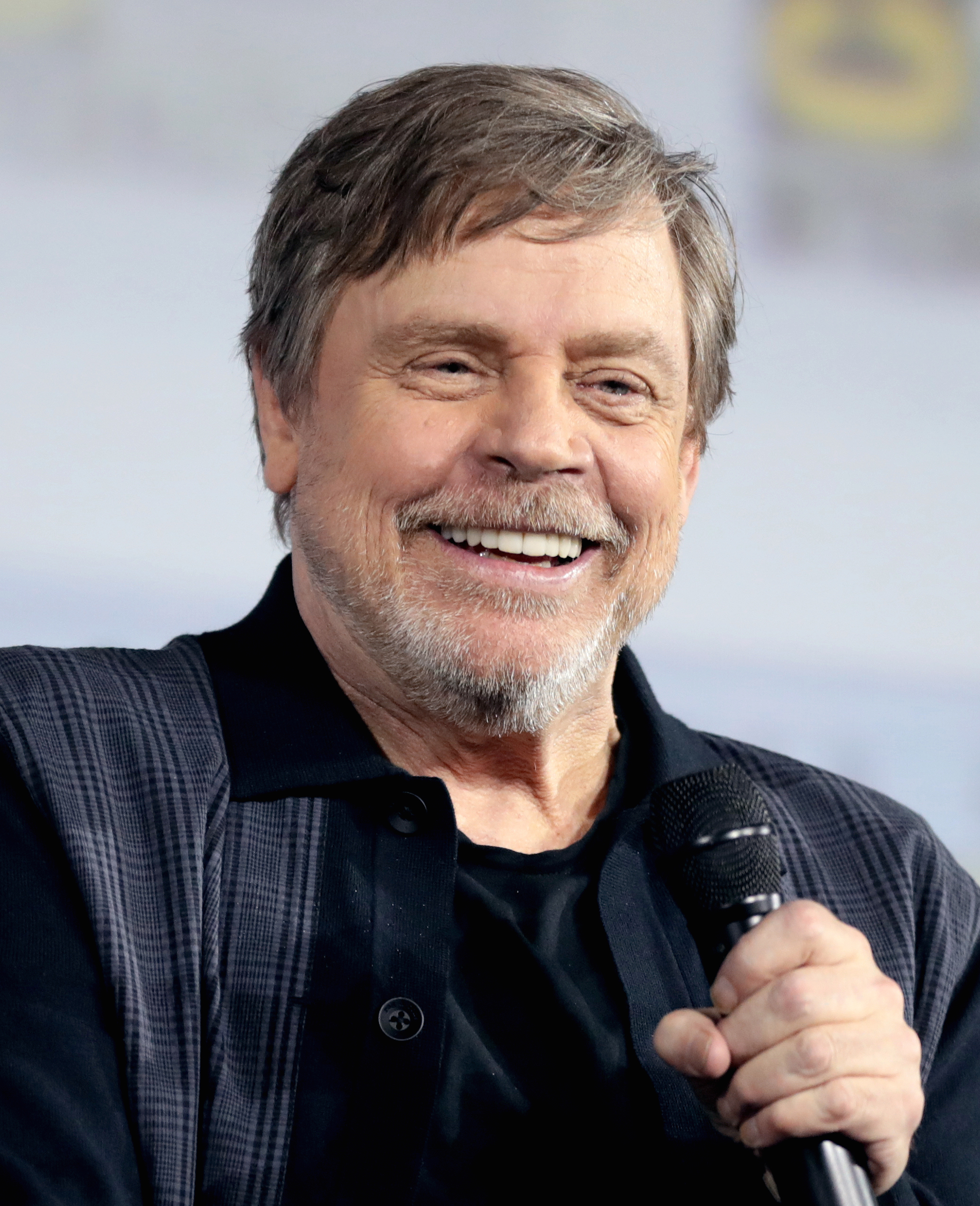
Mark Hamill

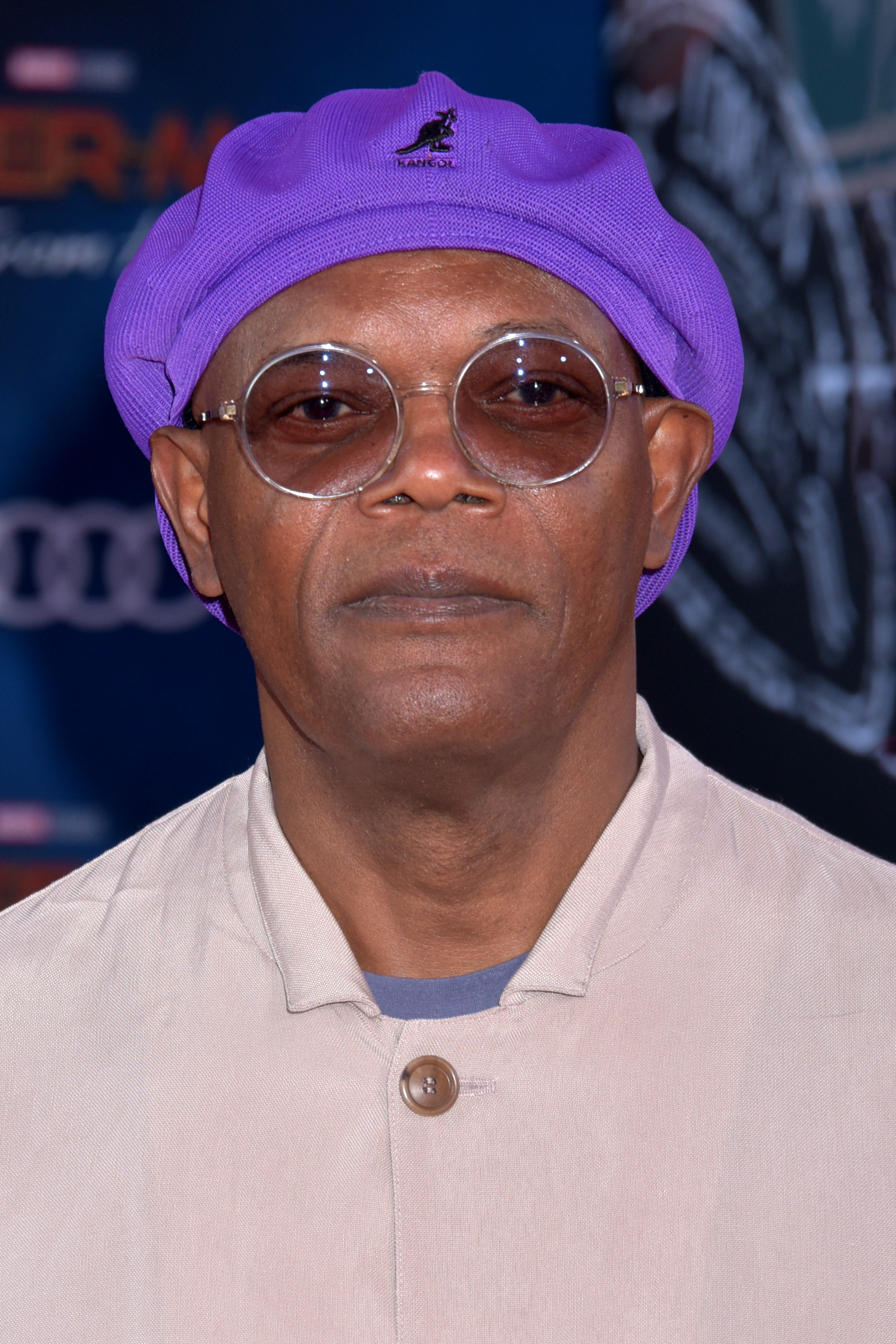
Samuel L. Jackson

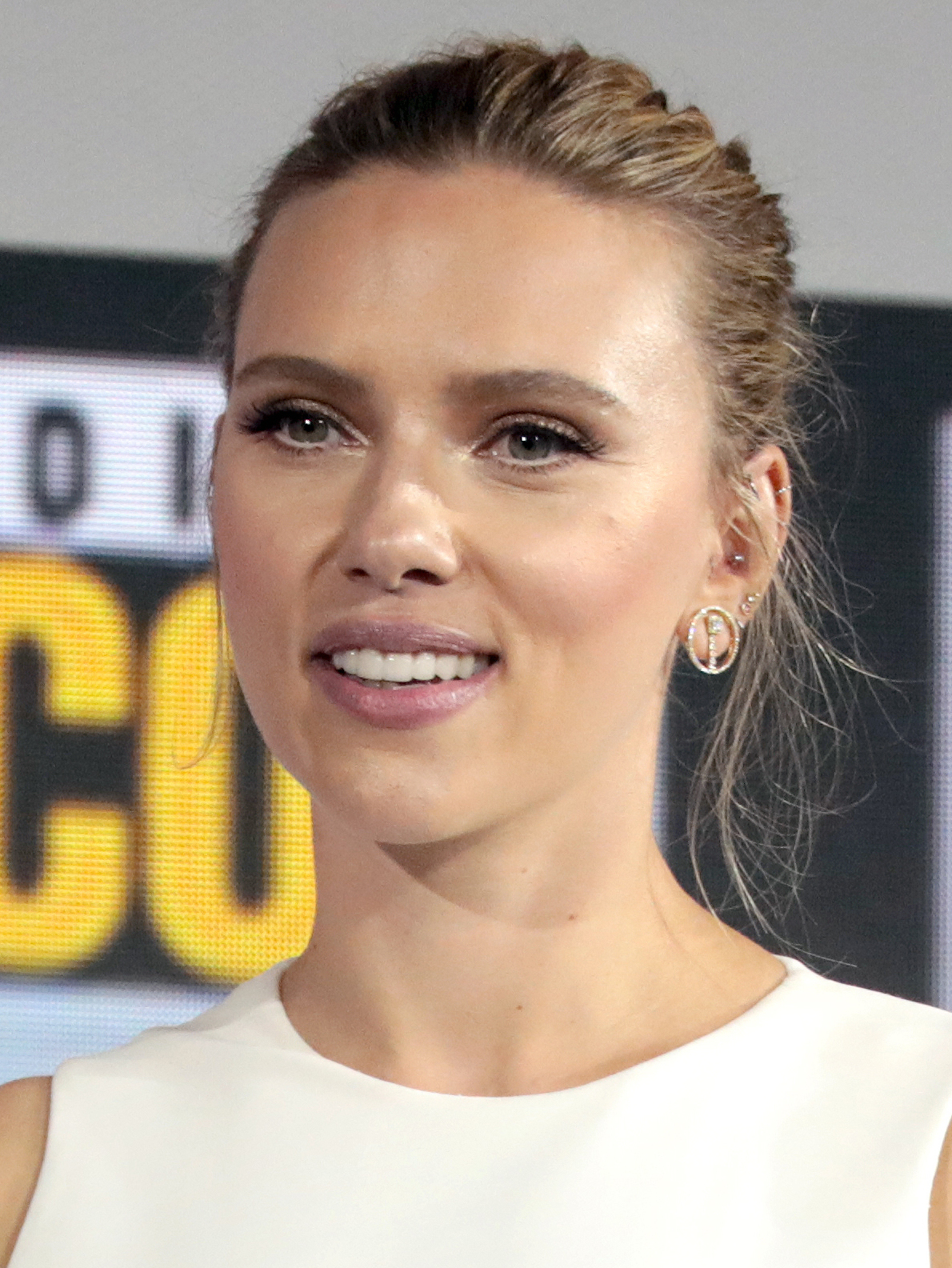
Scarlett Johansson

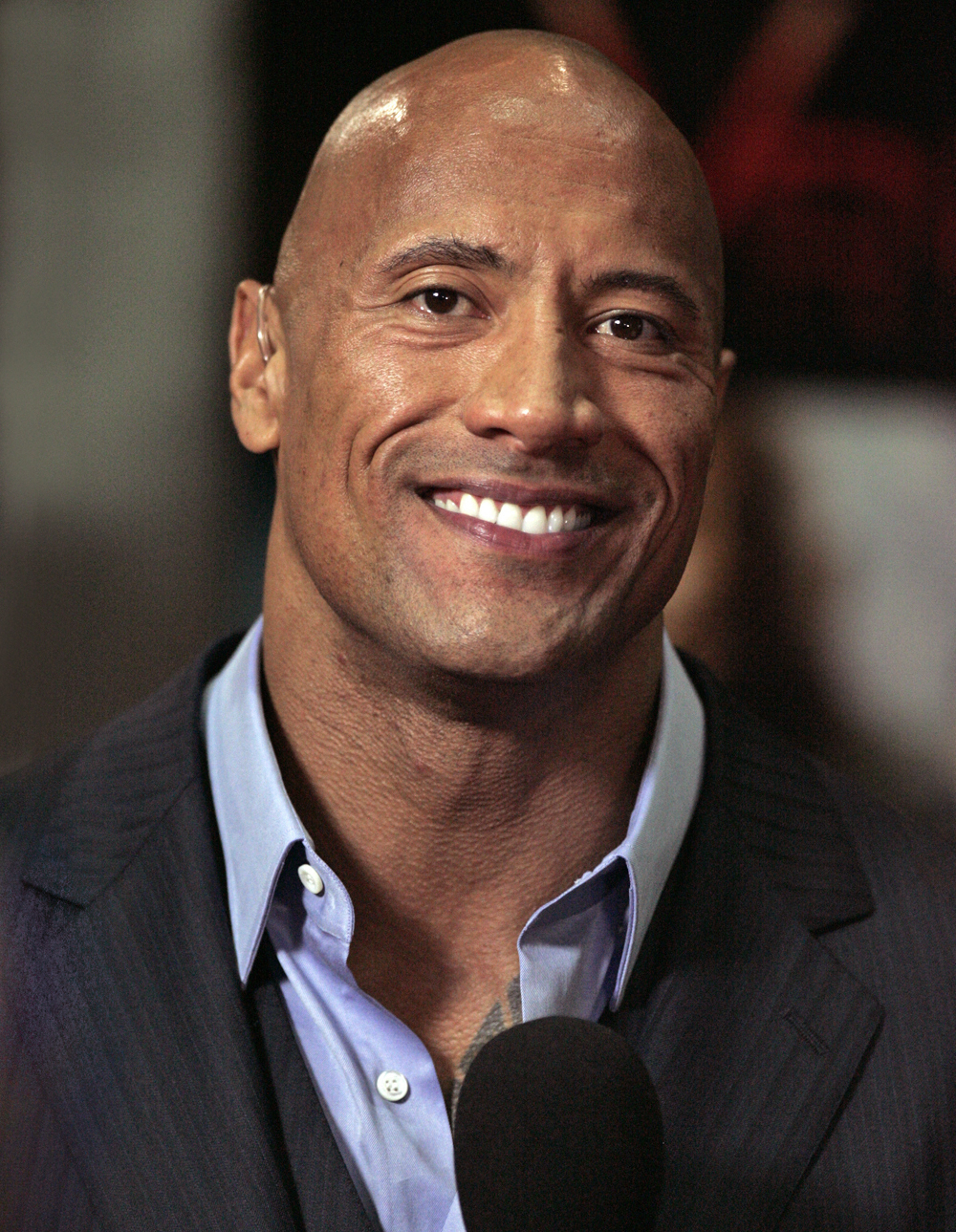
Dwayne Johnson

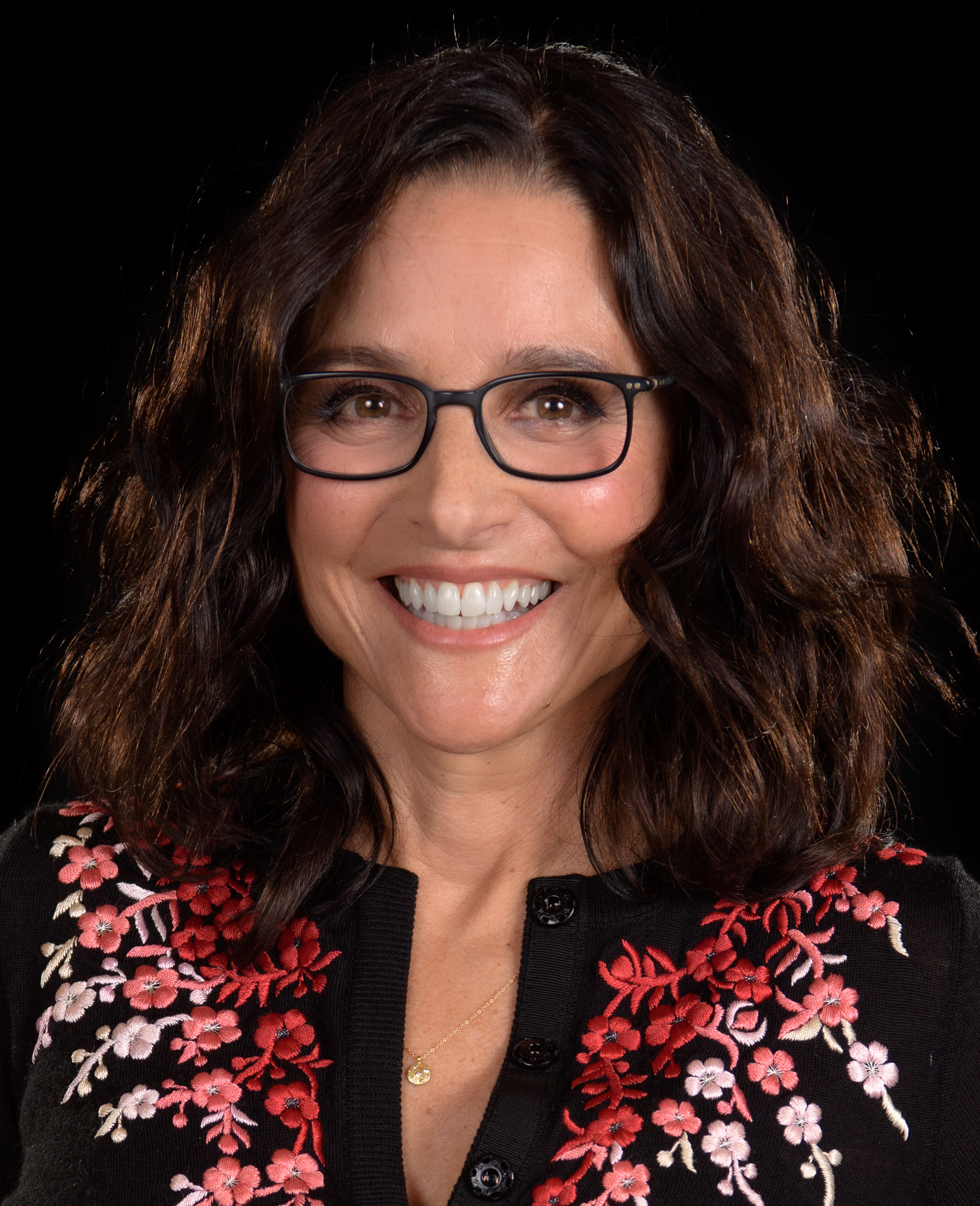
Julia Louis-Dreyfus

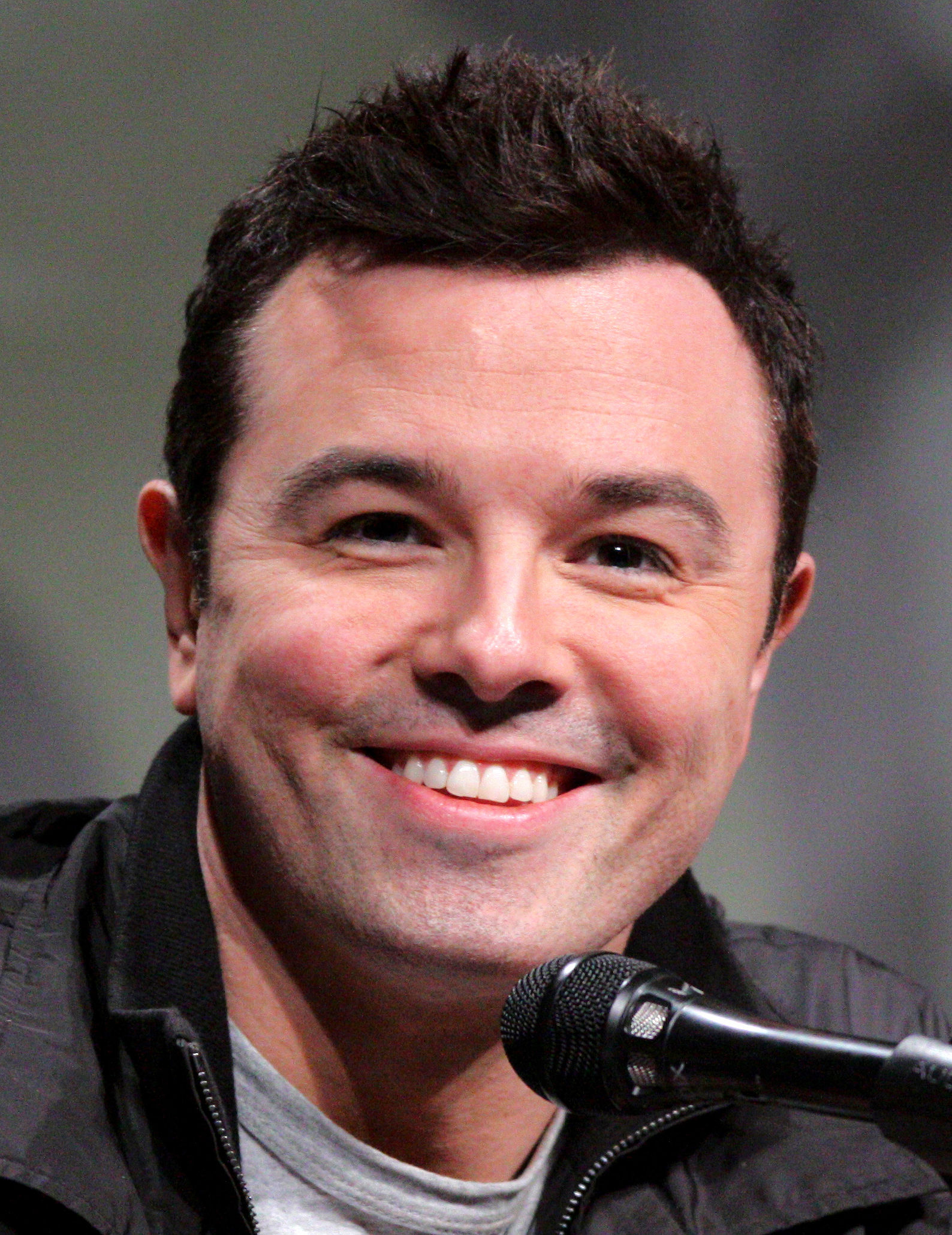
Seth MacFarlane

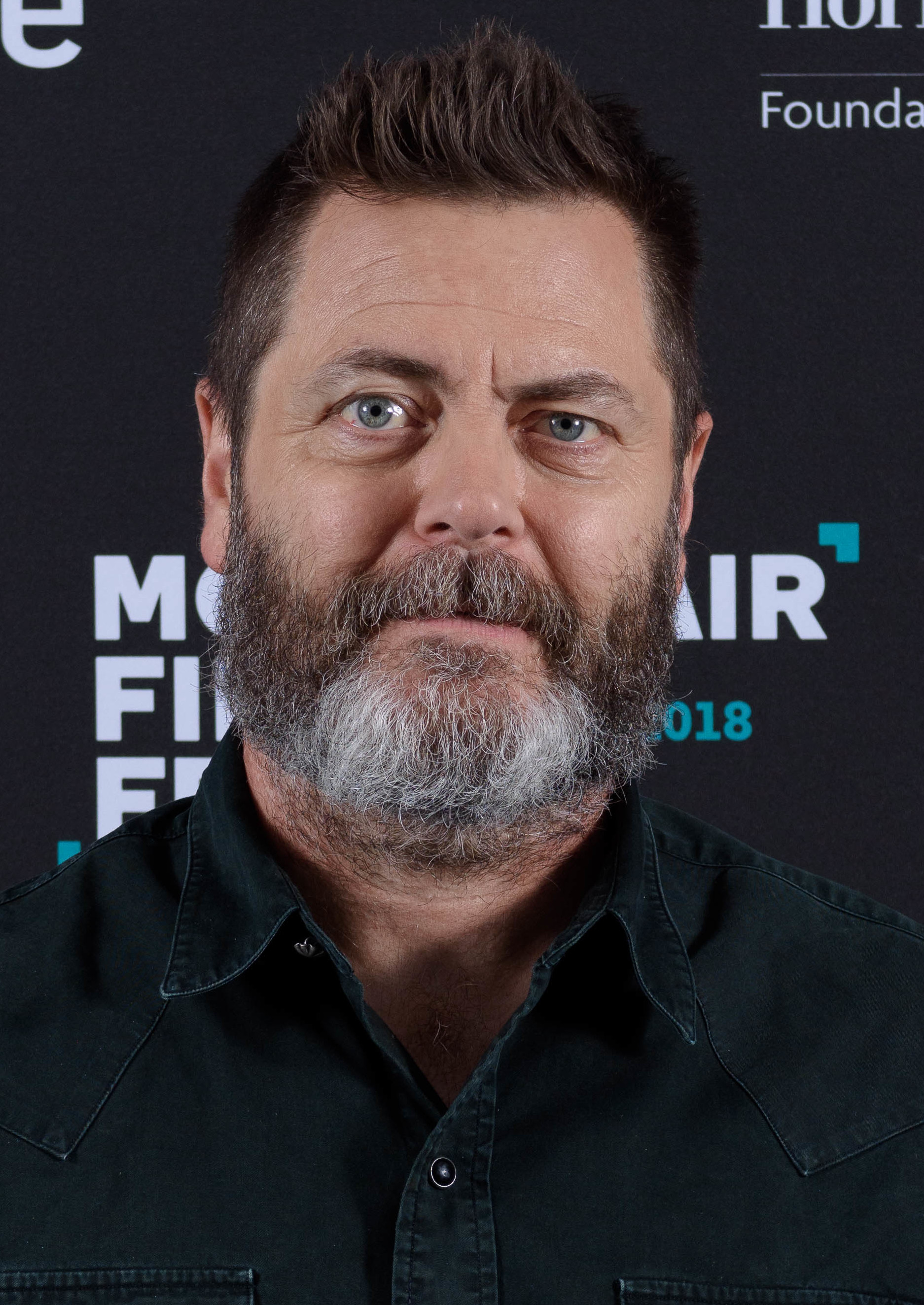
Nick Offerman

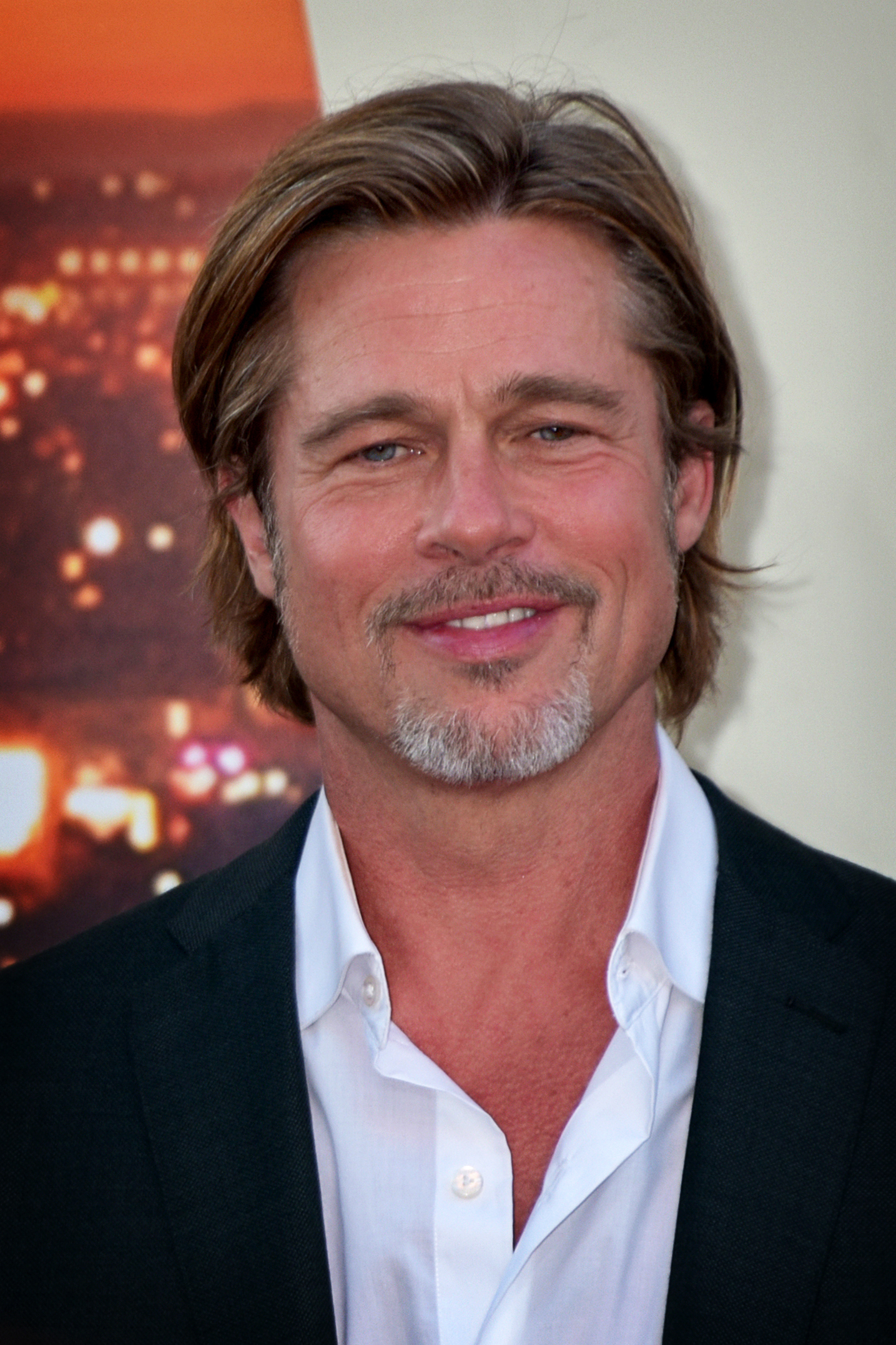
Brad Pitt

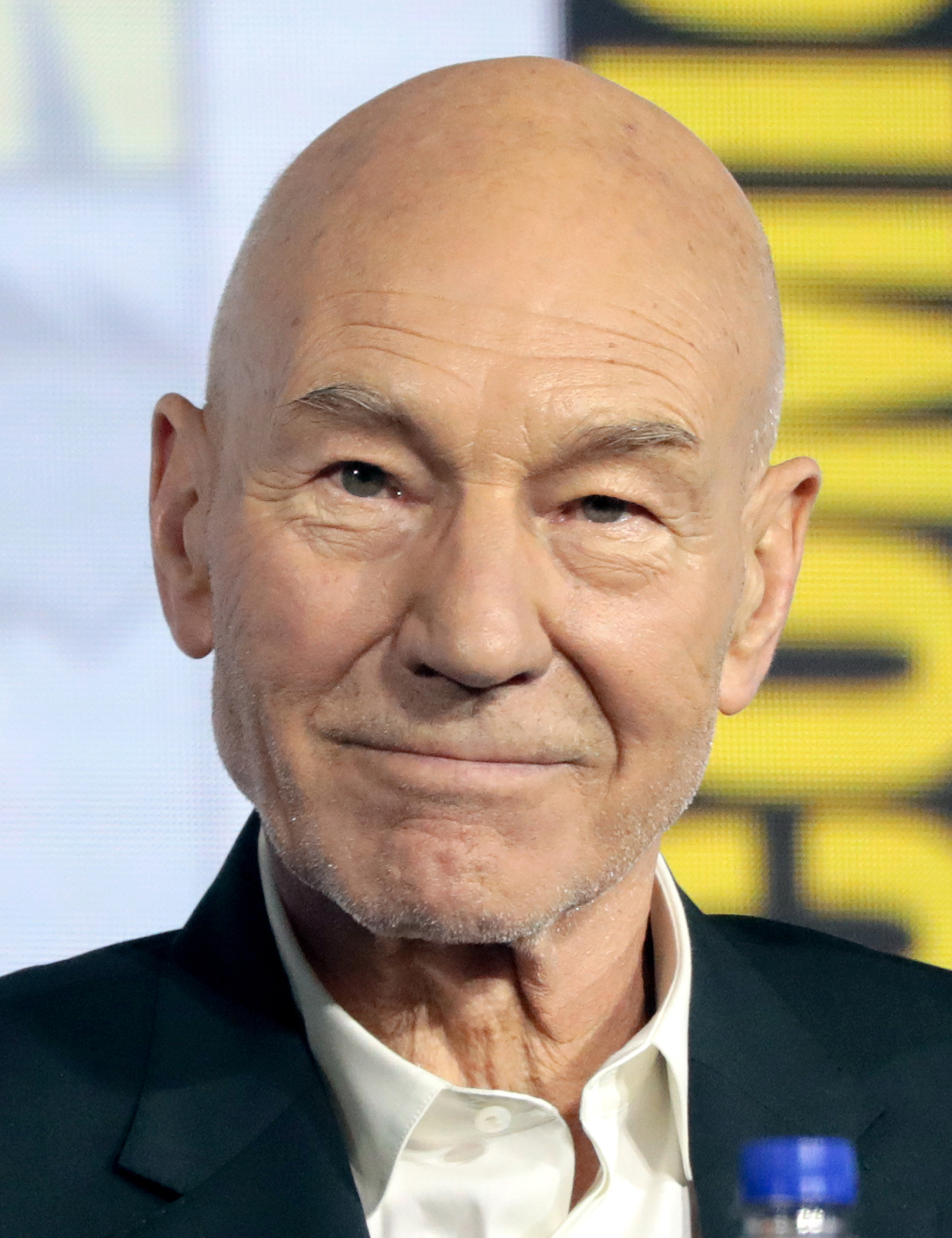
Patrick Stewart

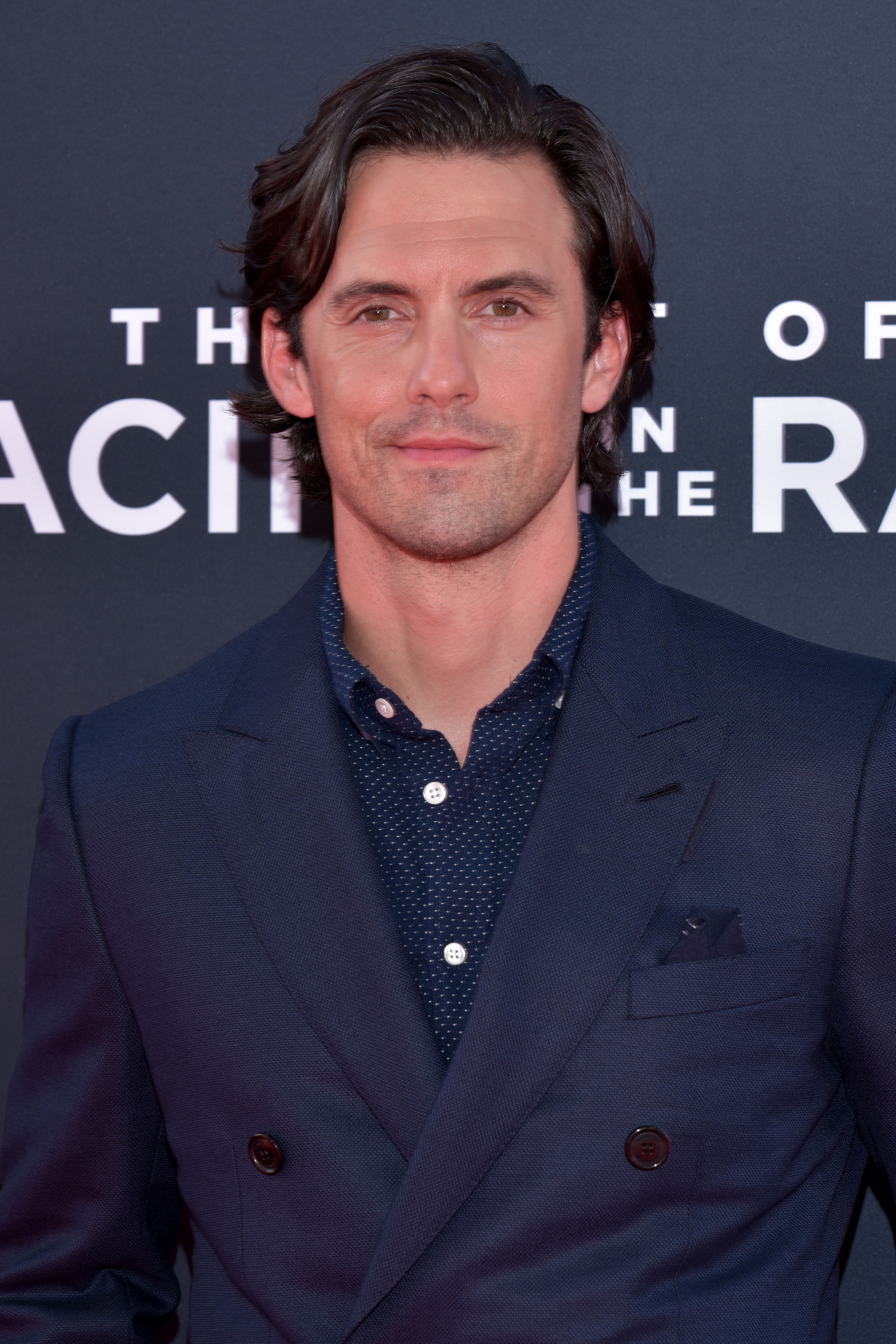
Milo Ventimiglia

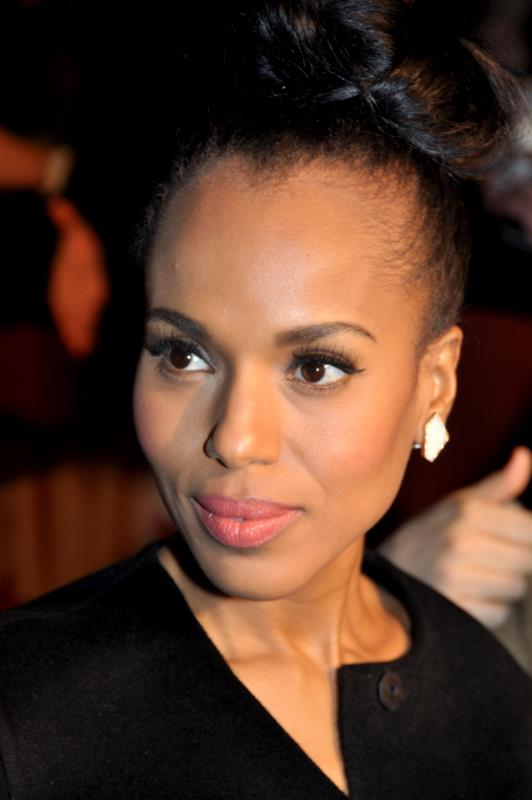
Kerry Washington

- A. D. Miles
- Aasif Mandvi
- Adam Kantor
- Adrienne Warren
- Alan Alda
- Alec Baldwin
- Alex Boniello
- Alex Brightman
- Alfre Woodard
- Ali Ewoldt
- Ali Stroker
- Alice Eve
- Alison Brie
- Alison Pill
- Allison Janney
- Ally Maki
- Alma Cuervo
- Alysia Reiner
- Alyssa Milano
- America Ferrera
- Amy Brenneman
- Amy Okuda
- Amy Poehler
- Amy Sedaris
- Andrew Barth Feldman
- Angela Bassett
- Andrew Keenan-Bolger
- André De Shields
- Angela Sarafyan
- Anna Chlumsky
- Anne Hathaway
- Annette Bening
- Anson Williams
- Anthony Rapp
- Armie Hammer
- Ashley Park
- Ashley Tisdale
- Aubrey Plaza
- Audra McDonald
- Ayesha Curry
- Ayodele Casel
- Barbara Hershey
- Barry Bostwick
- BD Wong
- Beanie Feldstein
- Ben Affleck
- Ben Harney
- Ben Platt
- Ben Stiller
- Beth Dover
- Beth Malone
- Betsy Struxness
- Bette Midler
- Bill Hader
- Billie Piper
- Billy Crystal
- Billy Porter
- Blake Lively
- Blythe Danner
- Brad Pitt
- Bradley Whitford
- Brandi Chavonne Massey
- Brent Spiner
- Brian Stokes Mitchell
- Brian Yang
- Caissie Levy
- Carolee Carmello
- Carrie Preston
- Cary Elwes
- Caterina Scorsone
- Celia Keenan-Bolger
- Charlize Theron
- Chaz Bono
- Chita Rivera
- Chloe Bennet
- Chloë Grace Moretz
- Chloë Sevigny (Note: Previously endorsed Bernie Sanders.)
- Chris Evans
- Chris Lowell
- Chris Pine
- Chrissy Teigen
- Christine Lahti
- Christopher Guest
- Christopher Mintz-Plasse
- Chuck Cooper
- Cobie Smulders
- Conrad Ricamora
- D'Arcy Carden
- Damon Lindelof
- Dana Delany
- Danny Pudi
- Daphne Maxwell Reid
- Darius de Haas
- Darren Criss
- Dave Bautista
- Daveed Diggs
- David Hyde Pierce
- Deborah Joy Winans
- Debra Messing
- DeLanna Studi
- Derrick Baskin
- Dianna Agron
- Dominique Jackson
- Don Cheadle
- Dondré Whitfield
- Drew Carey (Libertarian)
- Dulé Hill
- Dustin Hoffman
- Dwayne Johnson (Independent)
- Ed Asner
- Ed Helms
- Ed O'Neill
- Eden Espinosa
- Edie Falco
- Edward James Olmos
- Eiza González
- Elizabeth Banks
- Elizabeth Stanley
- Ellen Pompeo
- Emily Tarver
- Emma Myles
- Emmy Rossum
- Ephraim Sykes
- Eric Roberts
- Erika Henningsen
- Erin Moriarty
- Erin Wilhelmi
- Eva Longoria
- Evan Evagora
- Faran Tahir
- Fawzia Mirza
- Fran Drescher
- Francis Jue
- Fred Armisen
- Fred Weller
- Garcelle Beauvais
- Garrett Clayton
- Gates McFadden
- George Clooney
- George Salazar
- George Takei (Note: Previously endorsed Pete Buttigieg.)
- Gideon Glick
- Gillian Jacobs
- Glenn Close
- Graham Phillips
- Halle Berry
- Harrison Ford
- Harry Shearer
- Helen Hunt
- Helen Mirren
- Henry Winkler
- Hill Harper
- Hilary Duff
- Hilary Swank
- Hudson Yang
- Idina Menzel
- Iqbal Theba
- Isa Briones
- Ivory Aquino
- Jada Pinkett Smith
- Jaime Camil
- James Harkness
- James Monroe Iglehart
- Jamie Lee Curtis
- Jane Fonda
- Jane Lynch
- Janel Moloney
- Janina Gavankar
- Jason Alexander
- Jason George
- Jason Schwartzman
- Jason Tam
- Javier Muñoz
- Jayne Houdyshell
- Jeannie Gaffigan
- Jeff Daniels
- Jeff Goldblum
- Jeffrey Wright
- Jenna Leigh Green
- Jennifer Aniston
- Jennifer Garner
- Jennifer Lawrence
- Jennifer Lopez
- Jennifer Mudge
- Jenny Mollen
- Jeri Ryan
- Jesse Tyler Ferguson
- Jessica Biel
- Jessica Chastain
- Jim Carrey
- Jim O'Heir
- Jim Rash
- Jimmi Simpson
- Jimmy Smits
- Jin Ha
- Joe Lo Truglio
- Joel Grey
- Joel McHale
- John Cho
- John Leguizamo
- John Lithgow
- John Slattery
- John Stamos
- Jon Cryer
- Jonah Hill
- Jonathan Del Arco
- Jonathan Frakes
- Jose Llana
- Joseph Morgan
- Josh Gad
- Judith Light
- Judy Greer
- Judy Kuhn
- Julia Louis-Dreyfus
- Julia Roberts
- Julie Bowen
- Julianne Moore
- KaDee Strickland
- Kaitlin Olson
- Kal Penn
- Kalani Queypo
- Karen Olivo
- Karen Ziemba
- Kate Hudson
- Kate Mulgrew
- Kate Rockwell
- Kate Walsh
- Kathryn Allison
- Kathryn Grody
- Kathy Bates
- Katie Holmes
- Keala Settle
- Keith Carradine
- Keith Powell
- Keke Palmer
- Kelly Ripa
- Ken Marino
- Kerry Washington
- Kevin Costner
- King Bach
- Kristen Bell
- Kristen Schaal
- Kristin Chenoweth
- Krystal Joy Brown
- Kyra Sedgwick
- LaChanze
- Lake Bell
- Lana Parrilla
- LaTanya Richardson Jackson
- Laura Bell Bundy
- Laura Benanti
- Lauren Ridloff
- Lauren Tom
- Laurie Metcalf
- Lena Dunham
- Leonardo DiCaprio
- Leonardo Nam
- Lesli Margherita
- Leslie Odom Jr.
- Leslie Uggams
- LeVar Burton
- Lin-Manuel Miranda
- Lisa Rinna
- Liza Koshy
- Lois Smith
- Lou Diamond Phillips
- Louis Gossett Jr.
- Lucy Liu
- Lynda Carter*
- Lynn Whitfield
- Madhur Jaffrey
- Maggie Cassella
- Mandy Patinkin
- Manoel Felciano
- Marguerite Moreau
- Marina Sirtis
- Marion Ross
- Marisha Wallace
- Mariska Hargitay
- Marissa Jaret Winokur
- Mark Duplass
- Mark Hamill
- Mark Ruffalo
- Marlo Thomas
- Marlon Wayans
- Martha MacIsaac
- Mary McCormack
- Mary Steenburgen
- Matt Adler
- Matt Doyle
- Maulik Pancholy
- Maya Rudolph
- Mayim Bialik
- Maysoon Zayid
- Meagan Good
- Melissa Fitzgerald
- Meredith Baxter
- Mia Farrow
- Michael B. Jordan
- Michael Cera
- Michael Emerson
- Michael Ian Black
- Michael McElroy
- Michael Potts
- Michaela Watkins
- Michelle Hurd
- Mickey Rourke
- Milo Ventimiglia
- Mindy Kaling
- Molly Shannon
- Nathan Lane
- Neil Casey
- Nell Campbell
- Nick Offerman
- Nick Robinson
- Nicole Maines
- Nicolette Robinson
- Nik Dodani
- Nikki M. James
- Octavia Spencer
- Okieriete Onaodowan`
- Parvesh Cheena
- Patrick Stewart
- Patti LuPone
- Patti Murin
- Paul Adelstein
- Paul Rudd
- Pauley Perrette
- Peppermint
- Phillipa Soo
- Poorna Jagannathan
- Priyanka Chopra
- Ptolemy Slocum
- Quentin Earl Darrington
- Rachel Bloom
- Rachel Dratch
- Rachel Zegler
- Rain Valdez
- Ravi Patel
- Raúl Esparza
- Reese Witherspoon
- Renée Elise Goldsberry
- Richard Schiff
- Rita Moreno
- Rita Wilson
- Rizwan Manji
- Rob McClure
- Rob Reiner
- Robert Capron
- Robert De Niro
- Robert Downey Jr.
- Robert Redford
- Robin Wright
- Roosevelt Credit
- Rory O'Malley
- Rosalyn Coleman Williams
- Rosario Dawson
- Rosie Perez
- Rumer Willis
- Ryann Redmond
- Sacha Baron Cohen
- Sakina Jaffrey
- Sally Field
- Sam Elliott
- Sam Richardson
- Sam Waterston
- Samuel L. Jackson
- Sandra Bernhard
- Santiago Cabrera
- Saoirse Ronan
- Sarah Jessica Parker
- Sarah Paulson
- Sarah Rafferty
- Saycon Sengbloh
- Scarlett Johansson
- Sean Astin
- Sean Maguire
- Sean Patrick Thomas
- Sebastian Roché
- Selenis Leyva
- Sendhil Ramamurthy
- Seth MacFarlane
- Seth Rogen
- Shangela Laquifa Wadley
- Shannon Elizabeth
- Sharon Stone
- Shaun Ross
- Sheetal Sheth
- Shemar Moore
- Shona Tucker
- Shoshana Bean
- Sonequa Martin-Green
- Sophia Anne Caruso
- Sophia Bush
- Stephanie Beatriz
- Stephen Bogardus
- Sterling K. Brown
- Steve Buscemi
- Steven Boyer
- Steven Pasquale
- Storm Reid
- Susan Sarandon
- Tala Ashe
- Tamlyn Tomita
- Taraji P. Henson
- Tate Donovan
- Taylor Mac
- Ted Danson (Note: Previously endorsed Michael Bloomberg.)
- Telly Leung
- Terrence J
- Tessa Thompson
- Tia Carrere
- Tiffany Haddish
- Tim Curry
- Tina Fey
- Tituss Burgess
- Tom Hanks
- Tommy Chong
- Tony Goldwyn
- Tony Hale
- Tracee Ellis Ross
- Trevor and Sharon Eve
- Ty Burrell
- Uzo Aduba
- Val Kilmer
- Victoria Clark
- Viggo Mortensen
- Vivica A. Fox
- Wallace Shawn
- Wil Wheaton
- Will Smith
- Willam Belli
- Wilmer Valderrama
- Wilson Cruz
- Yara Shahidi
- Yeardley Smith
- Yvette Nicole Brown
- Zachary Quinto
- Zak Orth
- Zendaya
- Zoe Saldaña
- Zoey Deutch
- Zooey Deschanel
- Zoë Kravitz

== Authors and poets ==
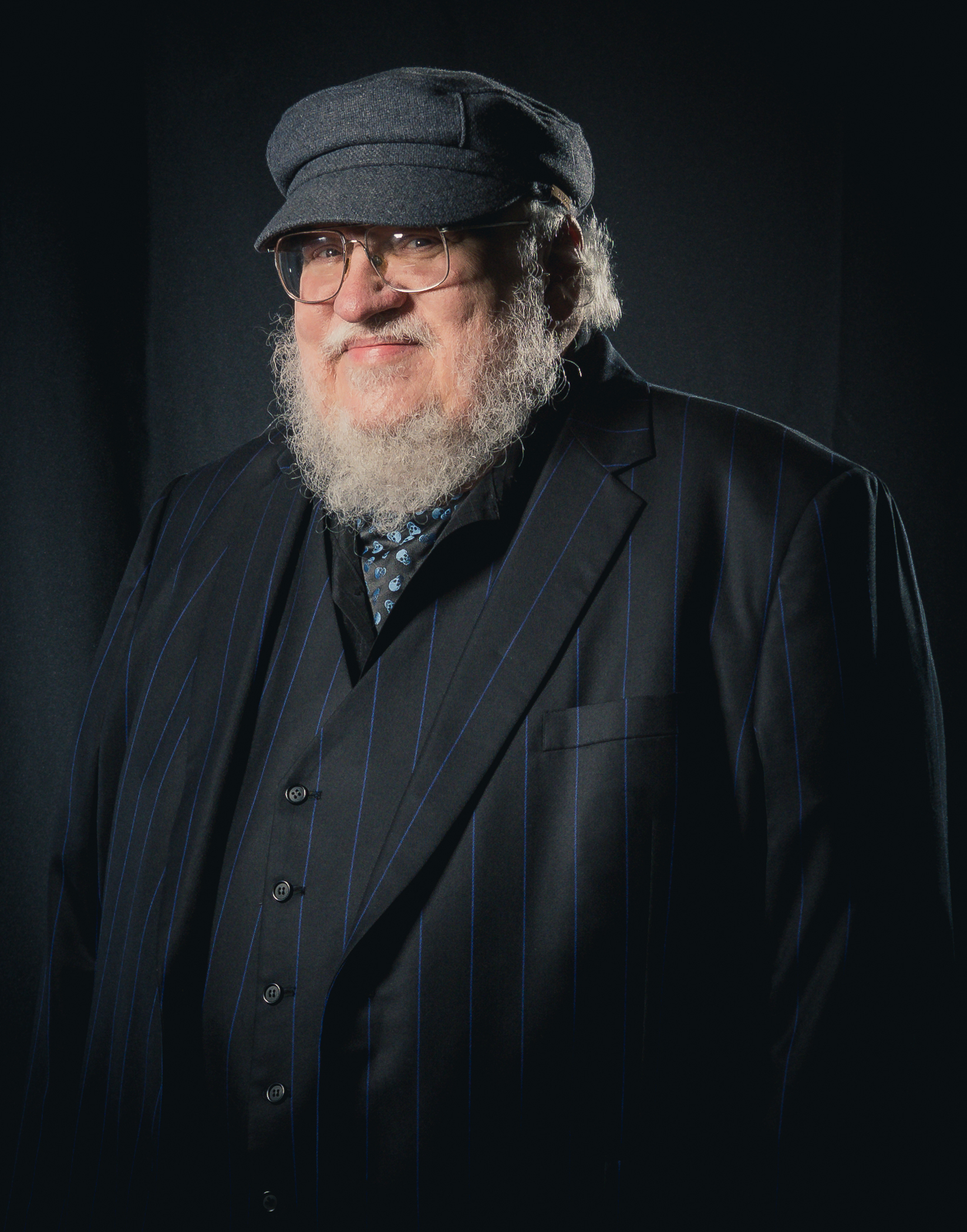
George R. R. Martin

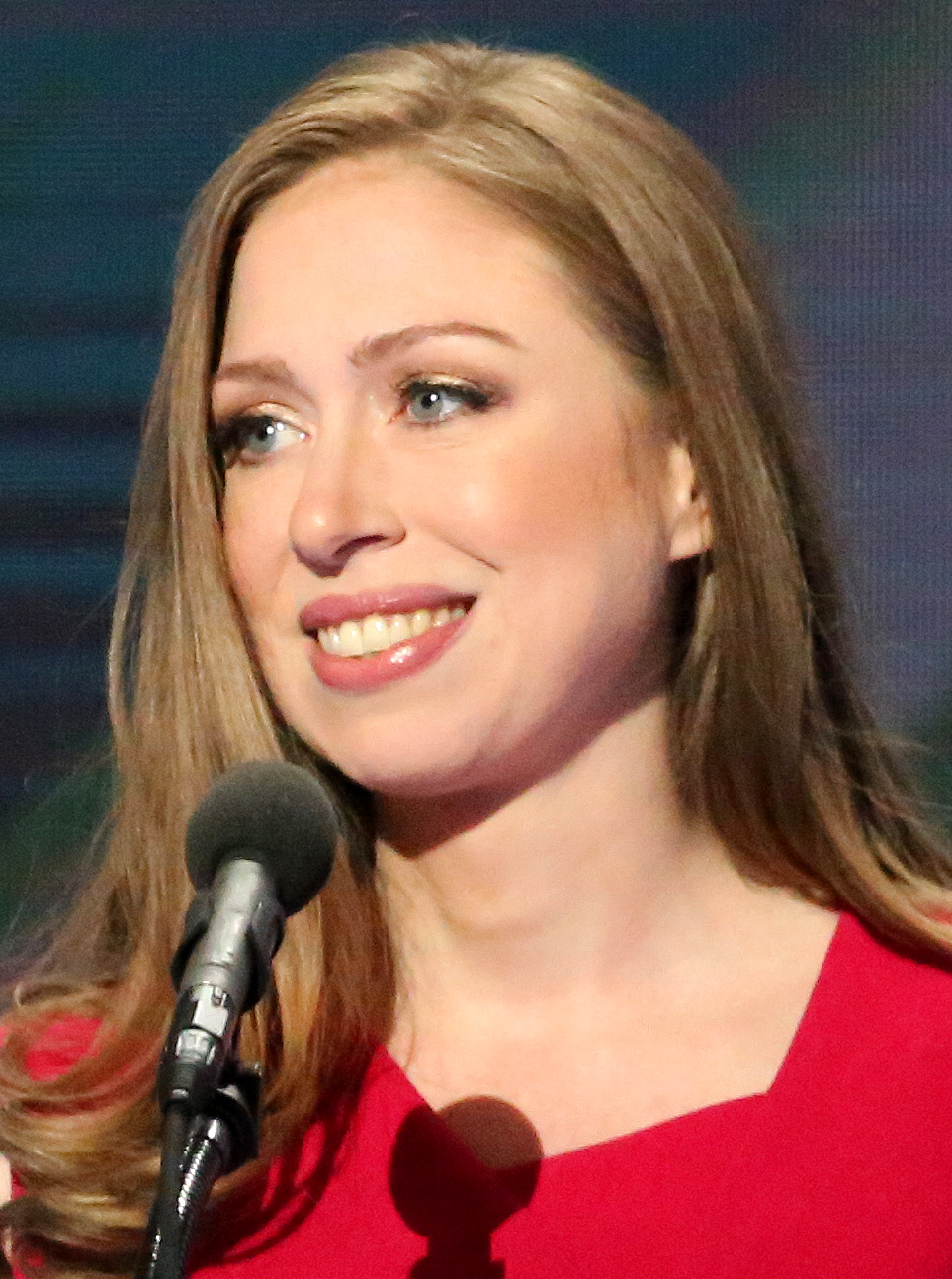
Chelsea Clinton

- Alexander Stille
- Barbara Ehrenreich
- Benjamin L. Corey
- Bobby LeFebre
- Brian McLaren
- Chelsea Clinton
- David Gushee
- Diana Butler Bass
- Emma Marris
- George R. R. Martin
- Glennon Doyle
- Hannah Friedman
- Hemant Mehta
- Isabel Allende
- Jeff Yang
- Jenny Han
- Jeph Jacques
- John Green
- John Hodgman
- John Pavlovitz
- John Scalzi
- Karenna Gore
- Katherine Schwarzenegger-Pratt
- Kevin Kwan
- Laura Day
- Marianne Williamson
- Marie Myung-Ok Lee
- Mark Siegel
- Nadia Bolz-Weber
- Padma Lakshmi
- Richard Blanco
- Richard Foster
- Robert Mailer Anderson
- Sally Hogshead
- Stephen King (Note: Previously endorsed Elizabeth Warren.)
- Thomas Abt
- Trav S.D.
- Vivek Tiwary

== Comedians ==
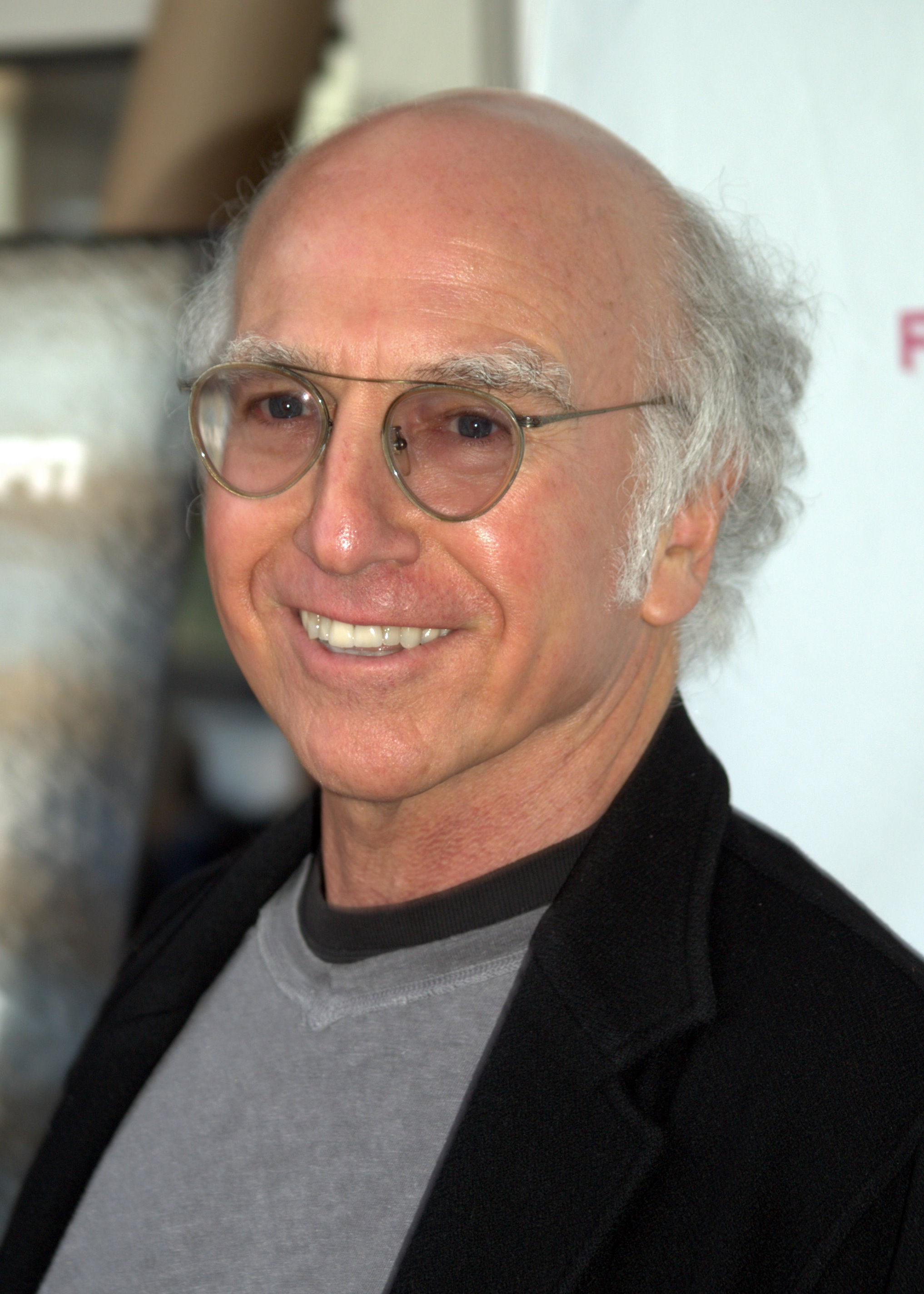
Larry David

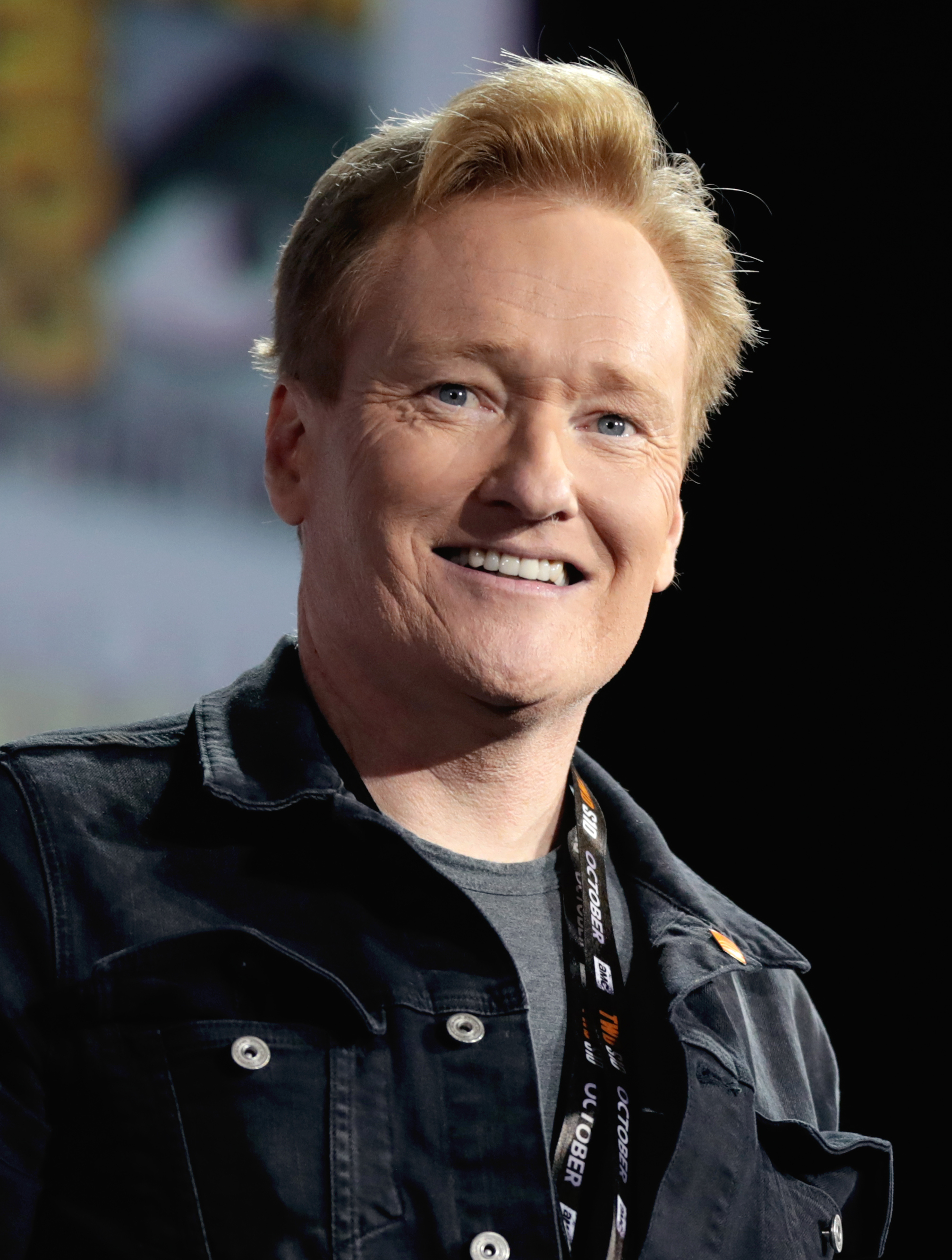
Conan O'Brien

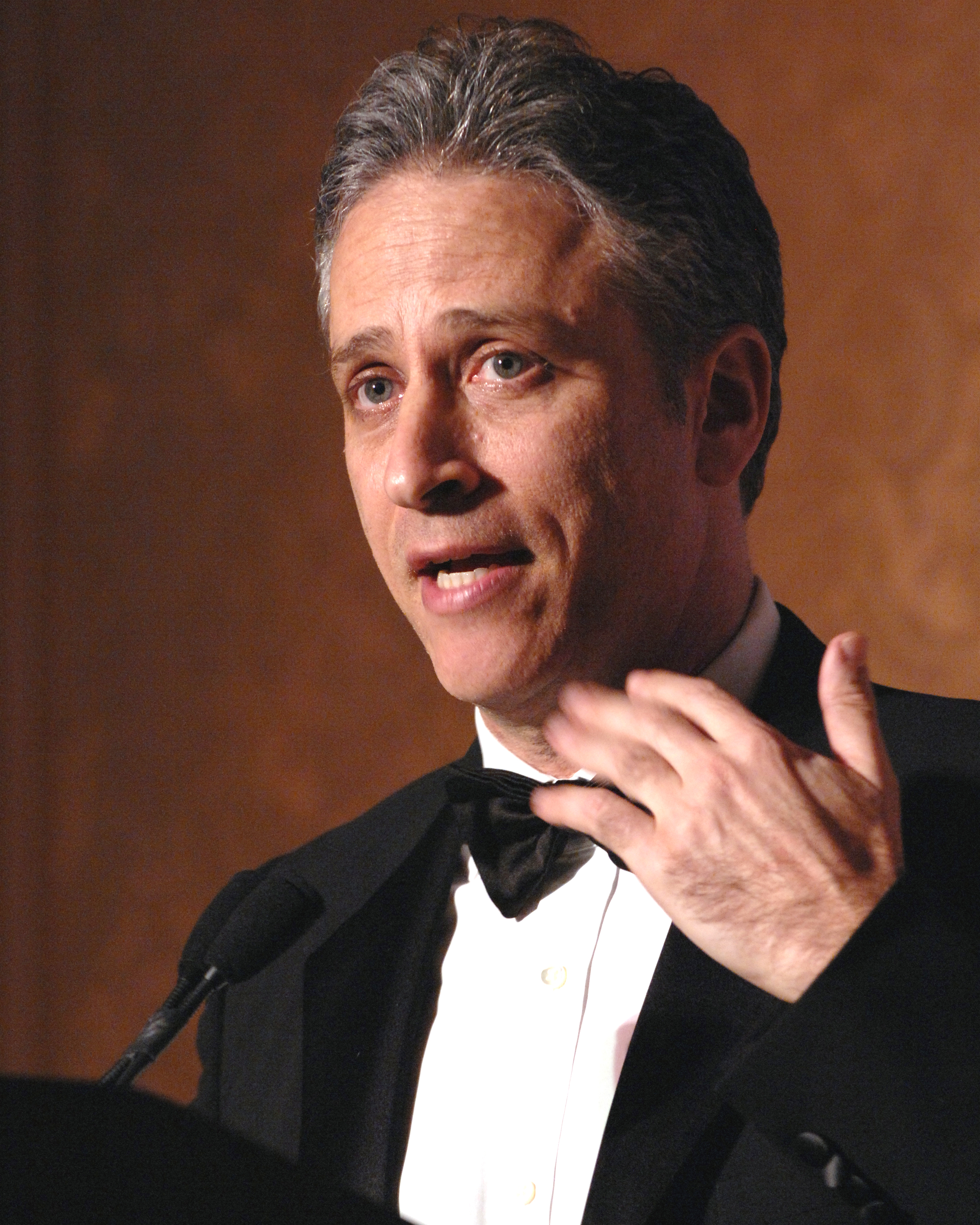
Jon Stewart

- Al Madrigal
- Alex Edelman
- Amy Hill
- Amy Schumer
- Aparna Nancherla
- Bill Maher
- Billy Eichner
- Chelsea Handler
- Chris Redd
- Christopher Titus
- Colin Jost
- Conan O'Brien
- Cristela Alonzo
- Daniel Rosen
- David Steinberg
- David Wain
- Eric Andre
- George Lopez
- Guillermo Rodriguez
- H. Jon Benjamin
- Hasan Minhaj
- Helen Hong
- Ilana Glazer
- Janeane Garofalo
- Jay Leno
- Jeff Garlin
- Jim Gaffigan
- Jimmy Kimmel
- John Oliver
- Jon Stewart
- Judy Gold
- Kathy Griffin
- Keegan-Michael Key
- Ken Jeong (previously endorsed Andrew Yang)
- Kumail Nanjiani
- Larry David
- Larry Wilmore
- Lilly Singh
- Margaret Cho
- Maz Jobrani
- Michael Showalter
- Mindy Kaling
- Pete Davidson
- Phoebe Robinson
- Randy Rainbow
- Retta
- Richard Lewis
- Rosie O'Donnell
- Samantha Bee
- Sarah Cooper
- Sarah Silverman
- Seth Meyers
- Stephen Colbert
- The Try Guys
- Wanda Sykes
- Whoopi Goldberg

== Film directors, producers, playwrights, and screenwriters ==
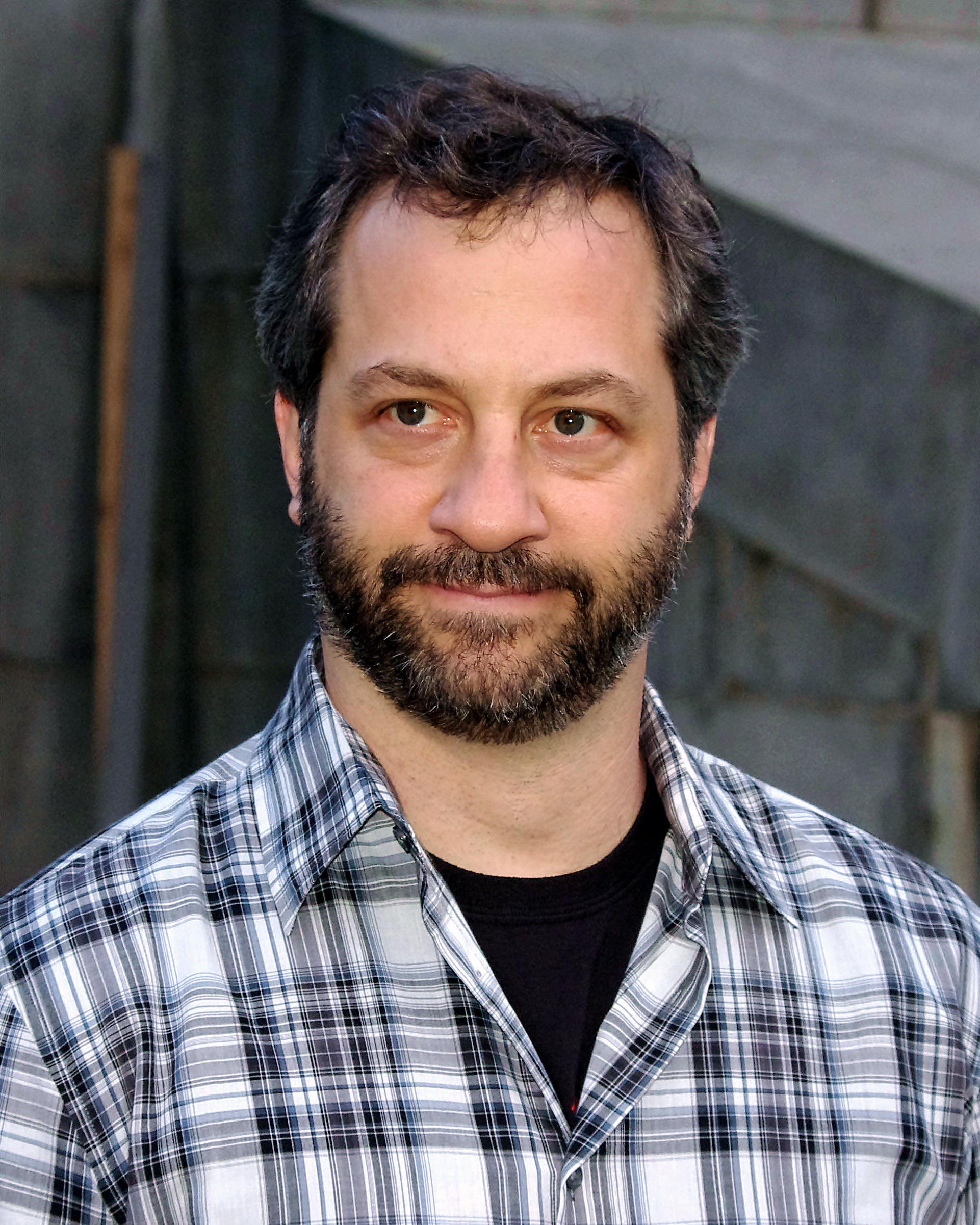
Judd Apatow

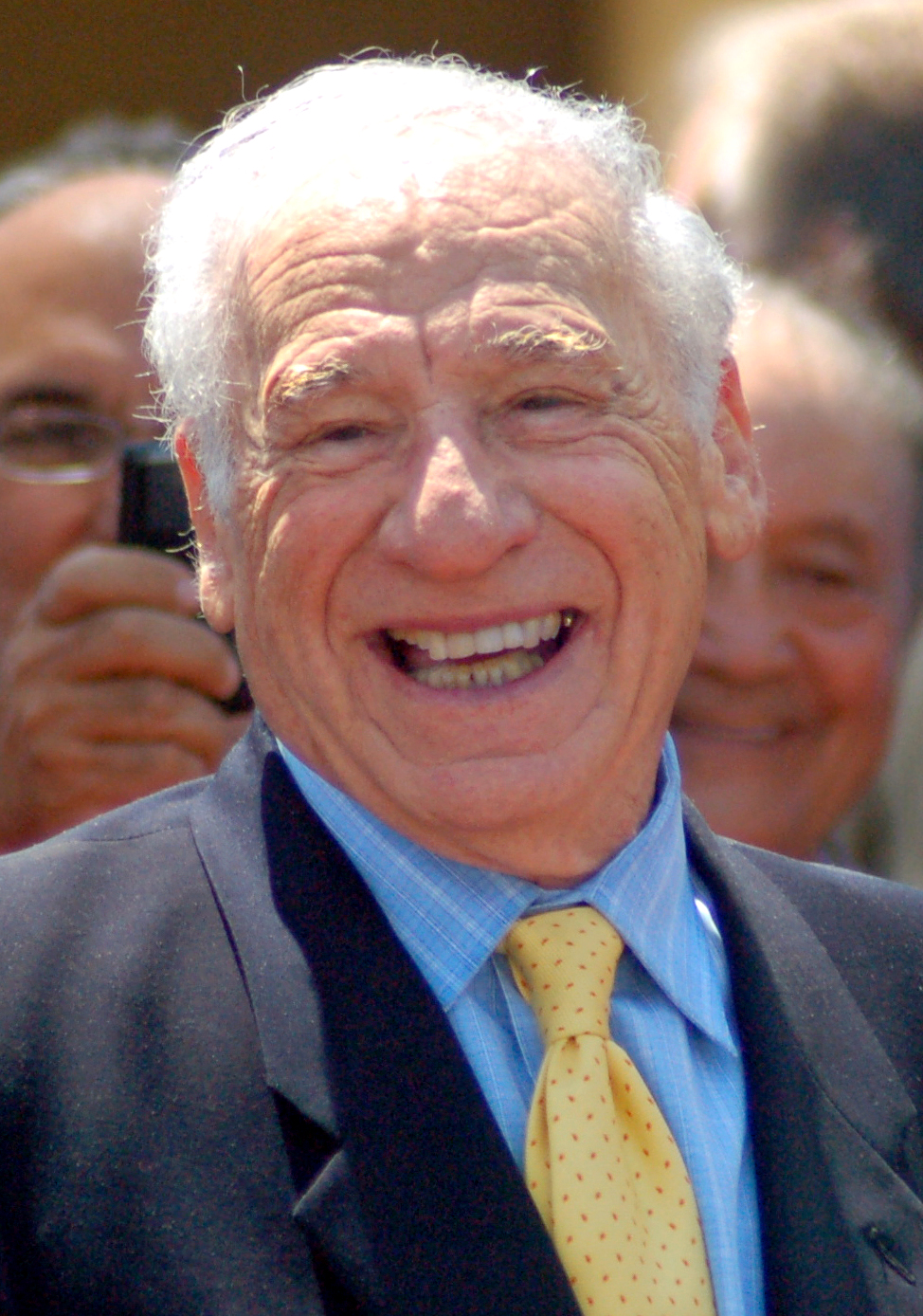
Mel Brooks

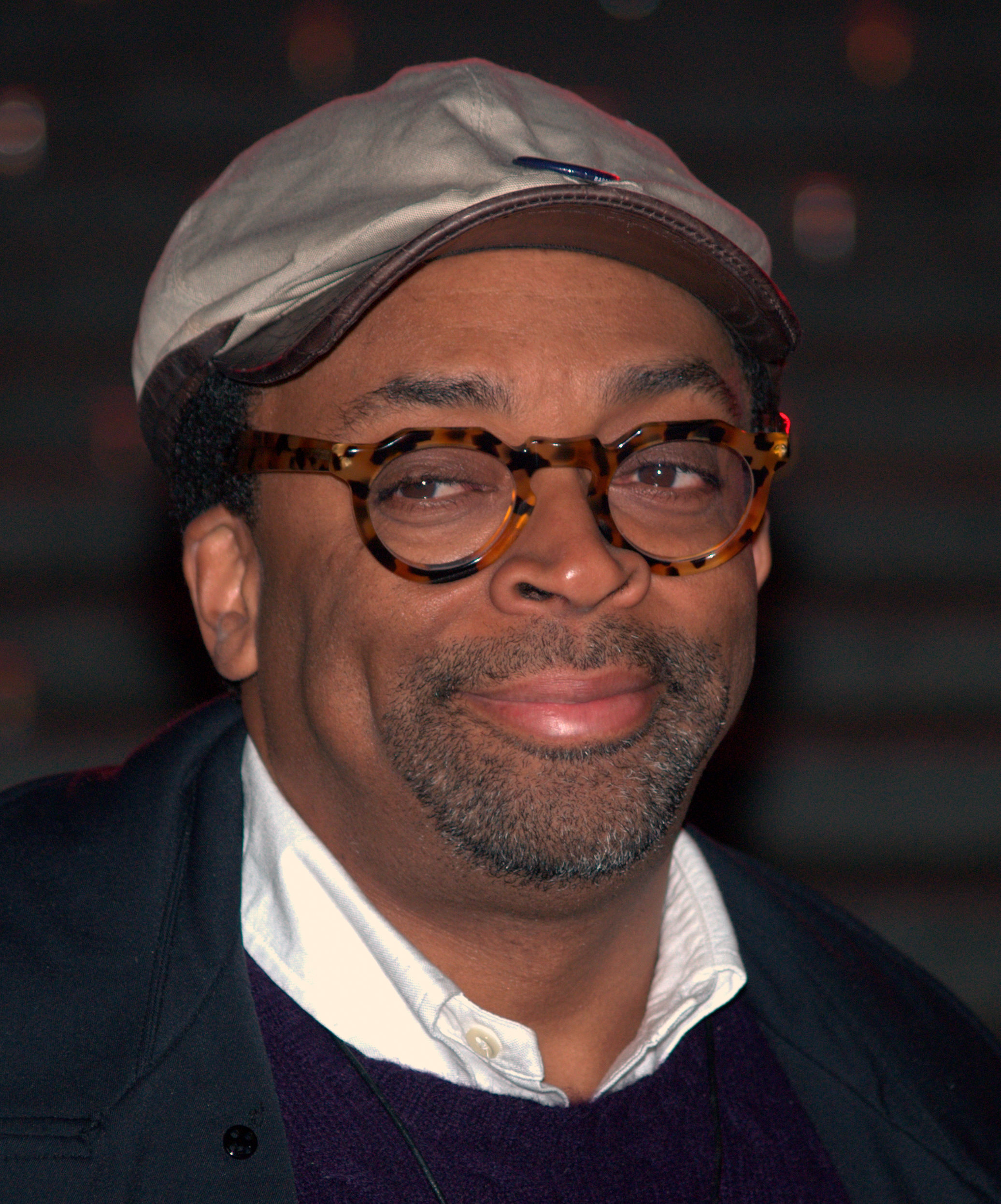
Spike Lee

- Aaron Sorkin
- Abigail Disney
- Andrew Bernstein
- Annabel Park
- Arvind Ethan David
- Aurin Squire
- Ava DuVernay
- Bartlett Sher
- Bill Kurtis
- Brad Falchuk
- Brad Jenkins
- Bruce Cohen
- Caroline Giuliani
- Chad Beguelin
- Chuck Lorre
- Cody Lassen
- Craig Anderson
- Craig Zisk
- Daniel Pritzker
- David Henry Hwang
- David Mandel
- David Yazbek
- Dean Devlin
- Debora Cahn
- DeVon Franklin
- Douglas McGrath
- Dustin Lance Black
- Edward Einhorn
- Evan Goldberg
- Greg Berlanti
- Greg Mottola
- Heidi Schreck
- J. J. Abrams
- Jamie Patricof
- Jenna Ushkowitz
- John Ridley
- John Waters
- Jordan Peele
- Josh Singer
- José Rivera
- Judd Apatow
- Ken Burns
- Kenny Leon
- Lauren Shuler Donner
- Lawrence Bender
- Lee Daniels
- Liesl Tommy
- Lowell Ganz
- Luis Salgado
- Lynn Nottage
- Marta Kauffman
- Matthew Lopez
- Mel Brooks
- Michael Kang
- Michael Moore
- Michael Patrick King
- Michael Schur
- Nicole Ehrlich
- Norman Lear
- Oliver Stone
- Patty Jenkins
- Paula Vogel
- Paula Wagner
- Pearl Cleage
- PJ Raval
- Randi Singer
- Rathna Kumar
- Rebecca Taichman
- Richard Sakai
- Rob Reiner
- Robert O'Hara
- Rod Lurie
- Ron Howard
- Anthony & Joe Russo
- Ryan Murphy
- Sahr Ngaujah
- Scott Stuber
- Shonda Rhimes
- Sidney Kimmel
- Spike Lee (Note: Previously endorsed multiple candidates.)
- Steven Spielberg
- Theresa Rebeck
- Tom Kirdahy
- Tony Kushner
- Tyler Perry

== Media personalities ==
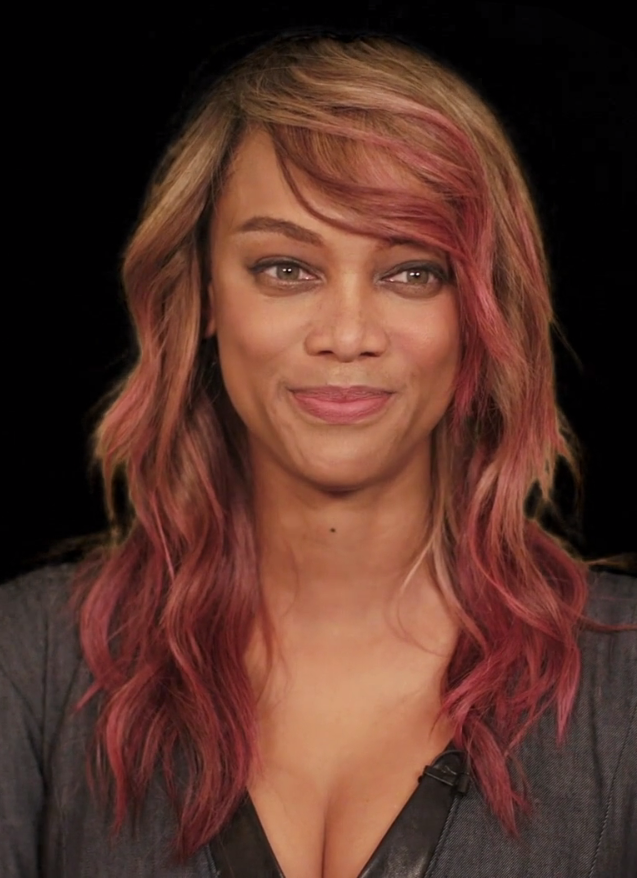
Tyra Banks

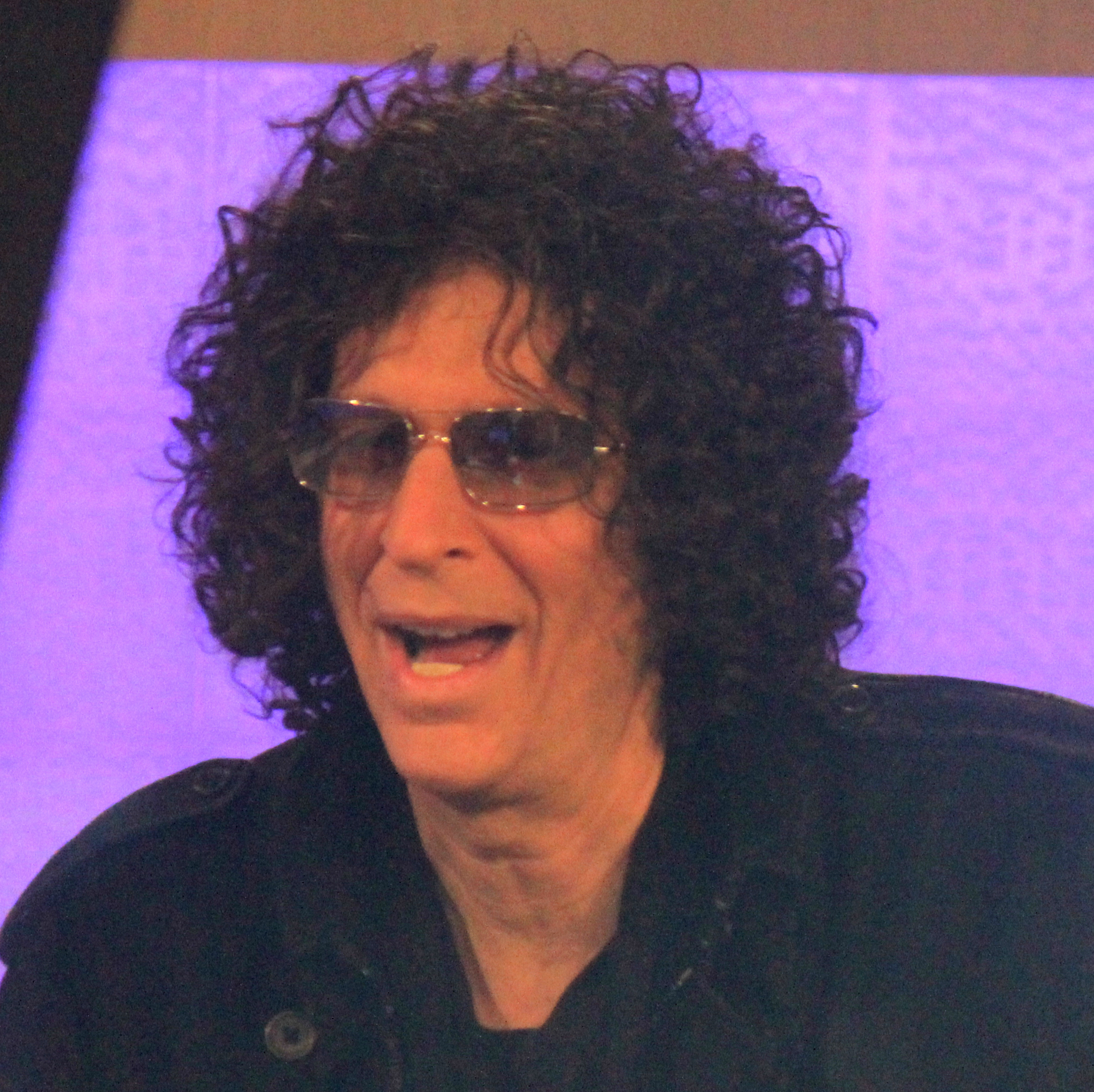
Howard Stern

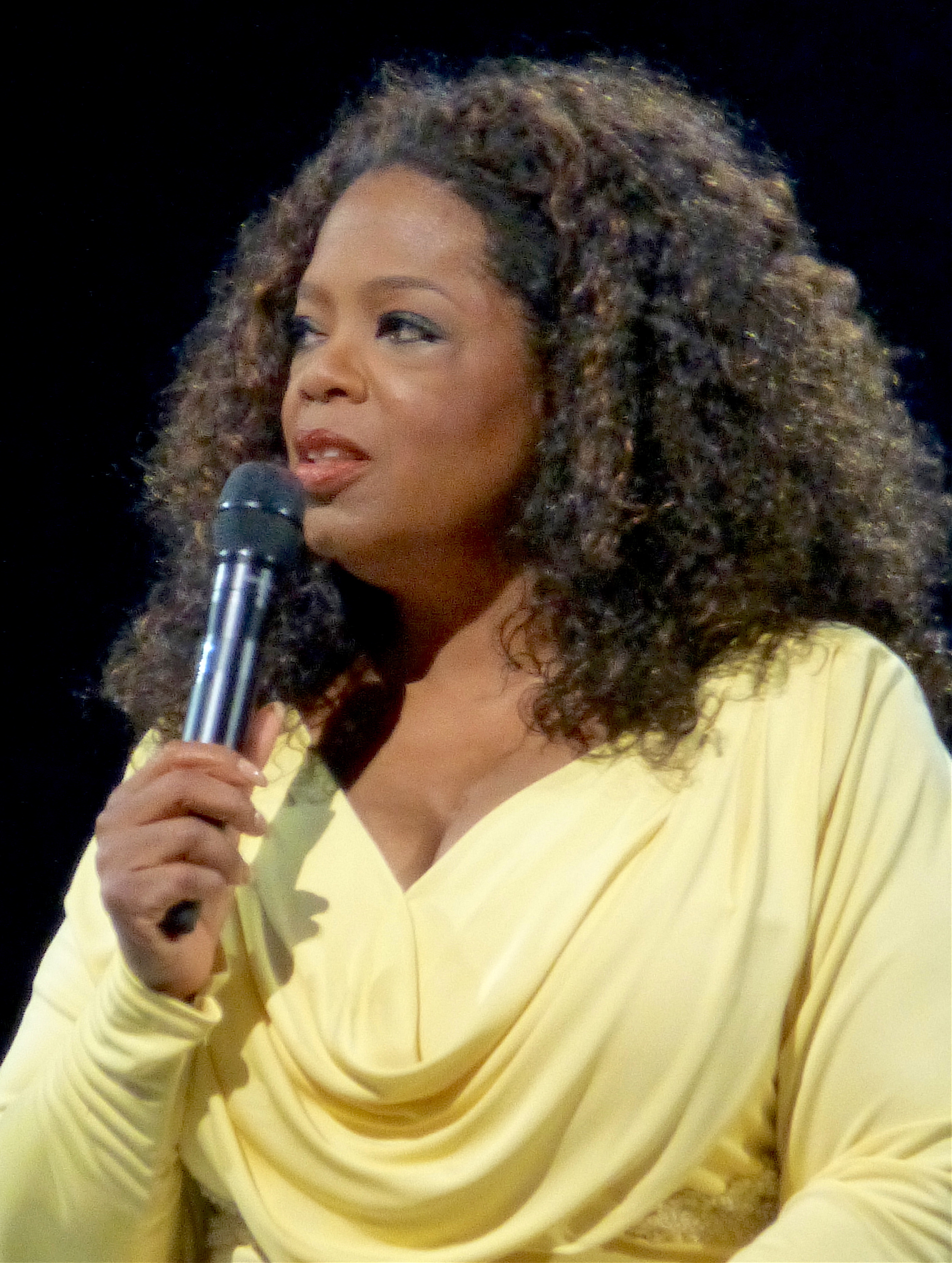
Oprah Winfrey

- Alyssa Edwards, choreographer, drag queen
- Amy Watson, ballet dancer
- Andy Cohen, radio and television talk show host, producer, and writer
- Antoni Porowski, co-host of Queer Eye and reality television personality.
- Ashley Bouder, ballet dancer
- Ballet Folklórico de México, Mexican folk ensemble
- Becca Kufrin, publicist, winner of season 22 on The Bachelor
- Bethany Mota, video blogger
- Bobby Berk, co-host of Queer Eye and reality television personality
- Brita Filter, drag queen
- Charlamagne tha God, radio presenter, television personality, and author
- Christopher Gattelli, choreographer, performer, theatre director
- Colleen Ballinger, YouTuber
- Connie Chung, journalist
- Dan Carlin, podcaster (Independent)
- Daphne Rubin-Vega, Panamanian-American dancer, singer-songwriter, actress
- David Letterman, television show host
- Elle Walker, vlogger and YouTuber
- Eva Gutowski, YouTube personality
- Frankie Grande, dancer
- Geena Rocero, supermodel, TED speaker
- Greg Miller, internet personality, former editor of IGN and founder of Kinda Funny.
- Ethan Klein, YouTuber and podcaster
- Hailey Bieber, model and television personality
- Howard Stern, radio and television personality, host of The Howard Stern Show
- Ian Kochinski (more commonly known as Vaush), American political YouTuber
- Jaida Essence Hall, drag queen
- James Charles, YouTuber and makeup artist
- Jerry Springer, television tabloid talk show host presenter
- Jonathan Scott, co-star of Property Brothers
- Jonathan Van Ness, co-host of Queer Eye and reality television personality.
- Karamo Brown, co-host of Queer Eye and reality television personality
- Karlie Kloss, fashion model
- Katie Couric, journalist and presenter
- Kayla Braxton, sports broadcaster
- Kylie Jenner, socialite, model
- La La Anthony, writer, stars of La La's Full Court Wedding and La La's Full Court Life
- Lady Bunny, drag queen (previously endorsed Sanders)
- Laganja Estranja, choreographer, drag queen
- Larry King, former television and radio talk show host presenter from CNN
- Lorin Latarro, choreographer
- Margaret Hoover, conservative political commentator, political strategist, author, great-granddaughter of Herbert Hoover (Republican)
- Martha Stewart, television presenter
- Maury Povich, television tabloid talk show host presenter
- Meghan McCain, daughter of former Arizona Senator and 2008 Republican presidential nominee John McCain, co-host of The View (Republican)
- Montel Williams, former television host, motivational speaker
- Nikita Dragun, YouTuber, makeup artist, and model
- Nina Davuluri, reality television host
- Oprah Winfrey, talk show host, television producer, actress, author, and philanthropist (Independent)
- Padma Lakshmi, author, activist, model, and television host
- Penn Jillette, magician, member of Penn & Teller
- Phil Donahue, former daytime talk host presenter
- Phil Yu, Korean-American blogger
- Reza Aslan, scholar of religious studies, writer, and television host
- S. E. Cupp, television host, conservative political commentator (Republican)
- Sally Jessy Raphael, former television tabloid talk host presenter
- Sarah-Elizabeth Langford, former beauty pageant titleholder
- Star Jones, former co-host of The View (1997–2006), lawyer
- Steven Kenneth "Destiny" Bonnell II, live streamer and political commentator
- Sunny Hostin, co-host of The View and former legal analyst of American Morning (2007–2011)
- Tan France, co-host of Queer Eye and reality television personality.
- Tana Mongeau, Internet personality, musician, model
- Ted Turner, entrepreneur, television producer, philanthropist, and founder of CNN
- Tinsley Mortimer, socialite
- Trixie Mattel, drag queen
- Tyra Banks, talk show host, model, producer

== Chefs and restaurateurs ==
- Anita Lo
- Carrie Nahabedian
- Cat Cora
- Duff Goldman
- Elizabeth Falkner
- Ina Garten
- Martin Yan
- Michael Solomonov
- Ming Tsai
- Nina Compton
- Rachael Ray
- Tom Colicchio

== Designers ==
- Carol Lim
- Clare Vivier
- Eileen Fisher
- Gabriela Hearst
- Humberto Leon
- Jason Wu
- Joseph Altuzarra
- Monique Péan
- Phillip Lim
- Prabal Gurung
- Thakoon Panichgul
- Thom Browne
- Tory Burch
- Vera Wang

== Photographers, painters, and architects ==
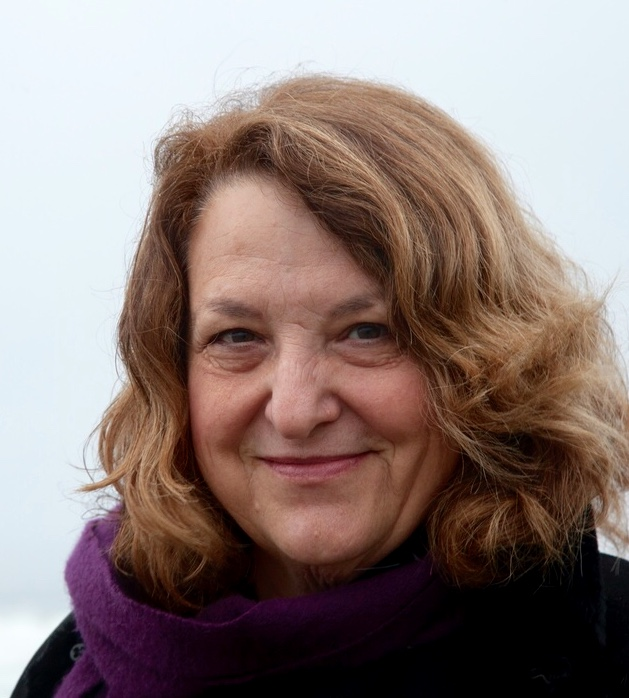
Lynn Hershman Leeson

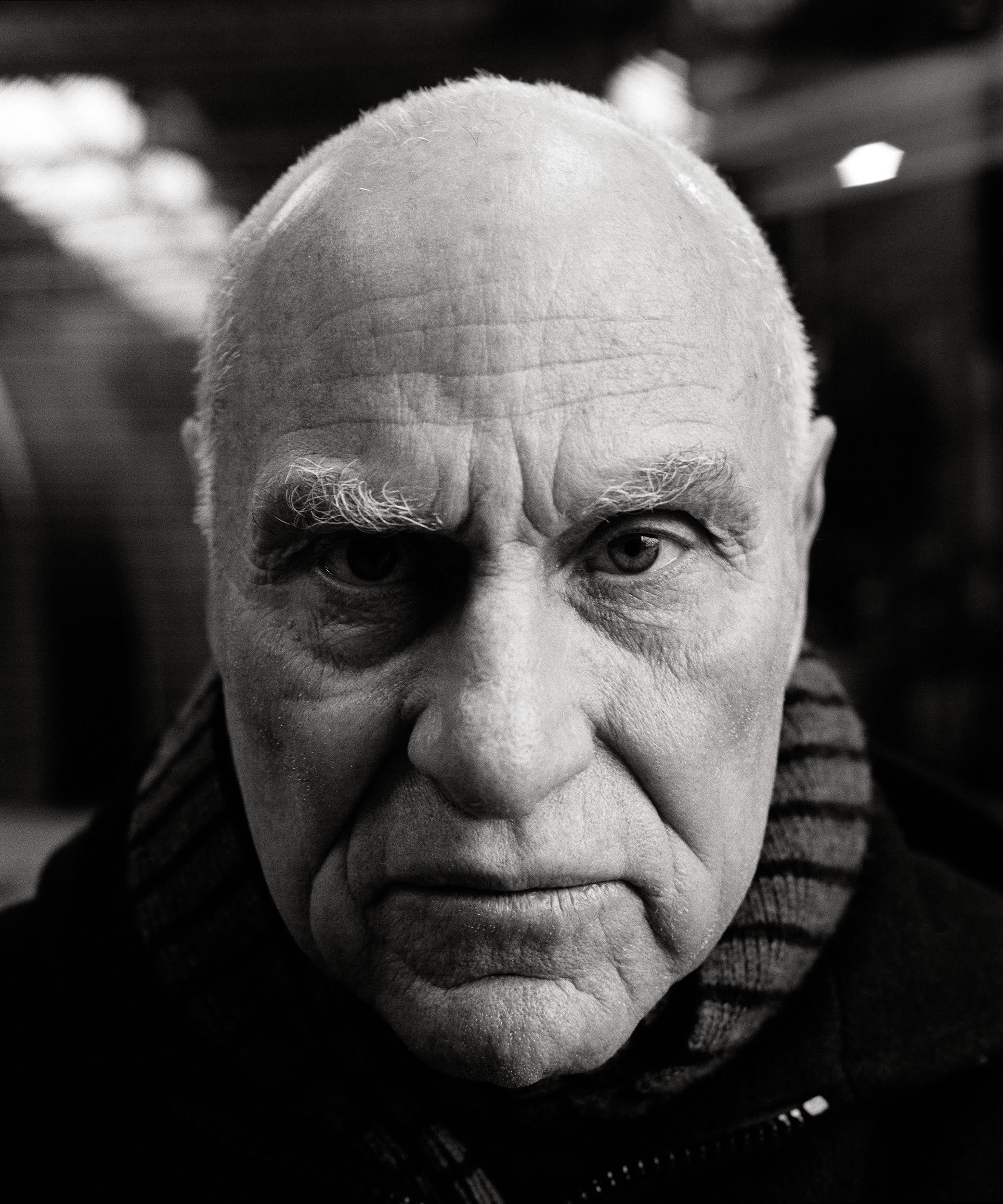
Richard Serra

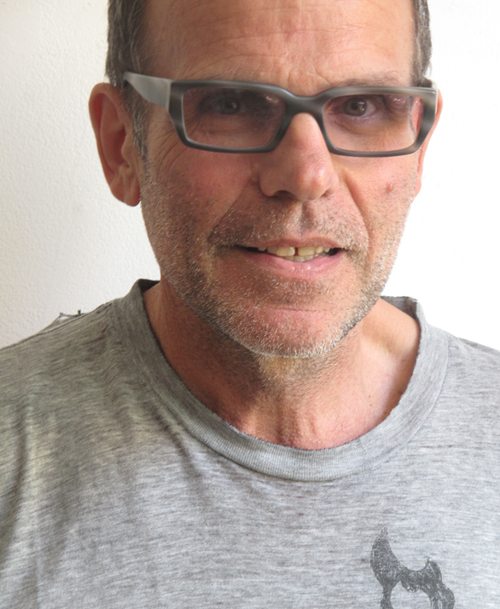
Rob Wynne

- Alexis Rockman
- Alice Neel's Estate
- Alison Saar
- Alvin Baltrop's Estate
- Amy Sillman
- An-My Lê
- Andrea Zittel
- Angel Otero
- Ayana V. Jackson
- Betye Saar
- Brice Marden
- Carmen Herrera
- Carol Bove
- Carrie Weems
- Carroll Dunham
- Catherine Opie
- Cecily Brown
- Charles Gaines
- Charline von Heyl
- Chloe Wise
- Christina Quarles
- Christine Kim
- Christopher Wool
- Cindy Sherman
- Deborah Kass
- Dike Blair
- Doron Langberg
- Doug Aitken
- Edward Ruscha
- Edwina Sandys
- Ellsworth Kelly's estate
- Emmanuel Lubezki
- Eric Shanower
- Fanny Sanín
- Fred Sandback's Estate
- Fred Tomaselli
- Gary Simmons
- George Condo
- Isca Greenfield-Sanders
- Ivan Morley
- Jack Pierson
- James Welling
- Jeff Koons
- Jenny Holzer
- Joanne Greenbaum
- Jon Kessler
- Jordan Nassar
- Julie Mehretu
- Kaws
- Kehinde Wiley
- Kenny Scharf
- Lari Pittman
- Laurie Simmons
- Lawrence Weiner
- Leo Villareal
- Lisa Yuskavage
- Liz Larner
- Lynn Leeson
- Marcel Dzama
- Marilyn Minter
- Martin Puryear
- Maya Lin
- McArthur Binion
- Michael Heizer
- Mika Tajima
- Pat Steir
- Patricia Cronin
- Rafa Esparza
- Rashid Johnson
- Rebecca Morris
- Richard Aldrich
- Richard Serra
- Rob Wynne
- Robert Longo
- Rochelle Feinstein
- Ron English
- Roy Lichtenstein's Estate
- Sam Gilliam
- Sarah Crowner
- Sarah Sze
- Sebastian Blanck
- Shepard Fairey
- Shirin Neshat
- Spencer Finch
- Suzan Frecon
- Tara Donovan
- Tavares Strachan
- Theresa Secord
- Toba Khedoori
- Trenton Hancock
- Ugo Rondinone
- Vik Muniz
- Wangechi Mutu
- William Eggleston
- Xaviera Simmons

== Musicians ==
=== Bands, duos, and musical groups ===
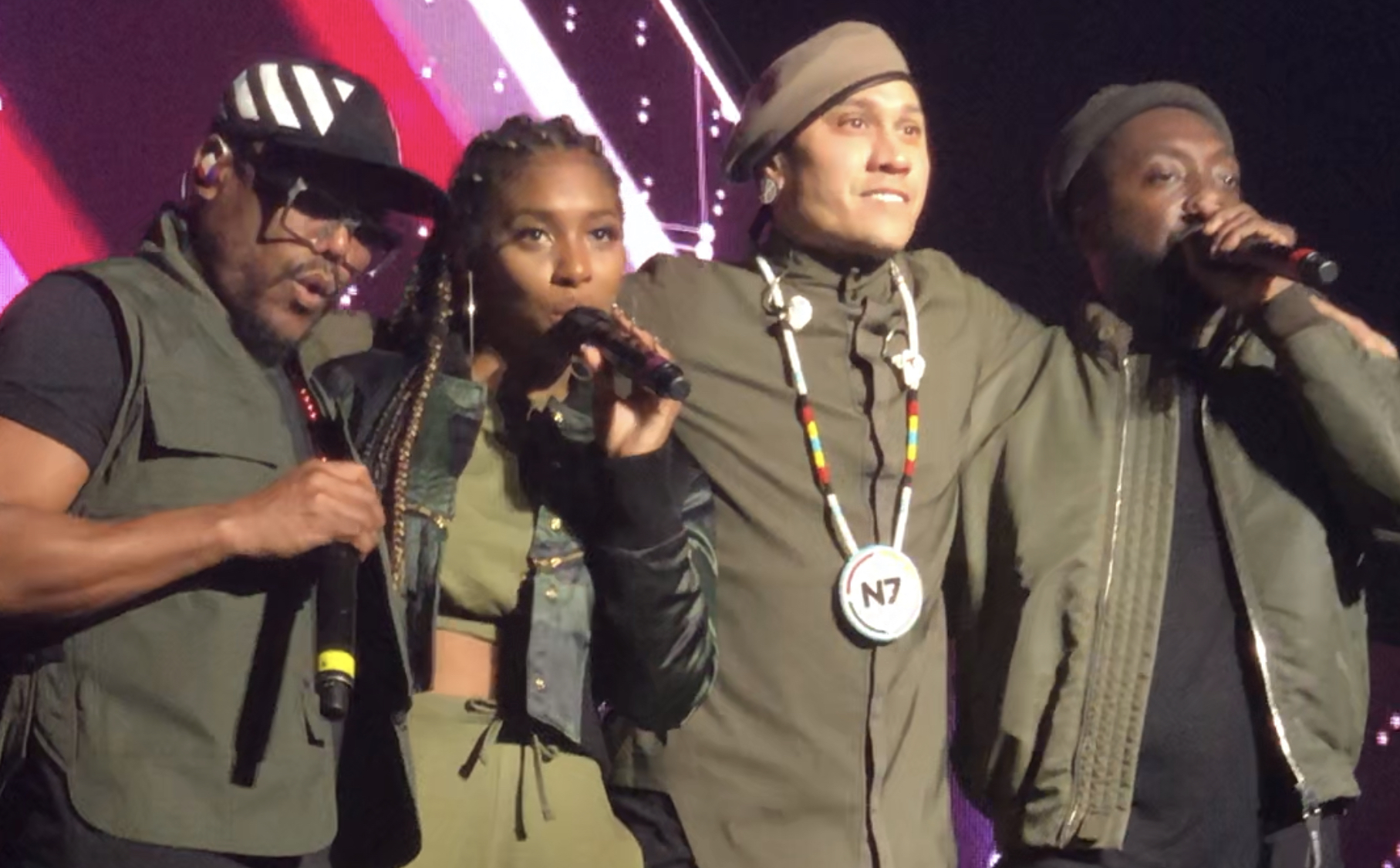
Black Eyed Peas

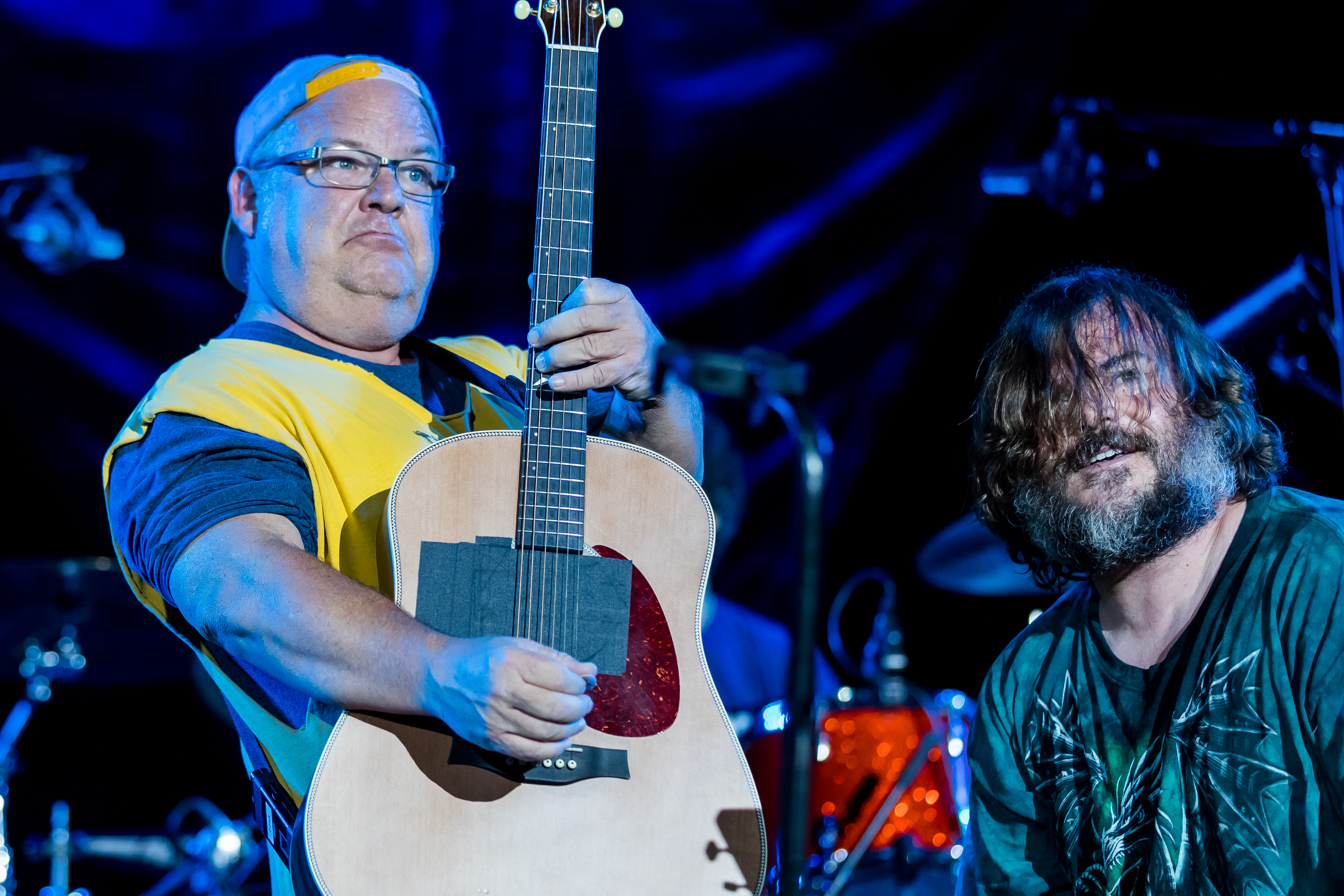
Tenacious D

- All Time Low
- Aly & AJ
- Andy Suzuki & The Method
- Bailen
- Beastie Boys
- Best Coast
- Black Eyed Peas
- Black Rebel Motorcycle Club
- Bon Iver
- Bon Jovi
- Bright Eyes
- The Chambers Brothers
- Cherish the Ladies
- The Chicks
- The Chieftains
- Chloe x Halle
- Chromeo
- The Clark Sisters
- Cozad Singers
- Dashboard Confessional
- Dawes
- De La Soul
- Dispatch
- The Dixie Cups
- The Dresden Dolls
- Drive-By Truckers
- Fall Out Boy
- Foo Fighters
- Four Tops
- Gangstagrass
- The Ghost of Paul Revere
- Harlem Gospel Choir
- The Head and the Heart
- Hippo Campus
- The Impressions
- Lawrence
- Los Lobos
- Lou and Peter Berryman
- Low Cut Connie
- MisterWives
- Moon Taxi
- Mt. Joy
- My Morning Jacket
- Nine Inch Nails
- The O'Jays
- OK Go
- Overcoats
- Pearl Jam
- Portugal. The Man
- The Postal Service
- Ranky Tanky
- Silversun Pickups
- Social House
- Sounds of Blackness
- Spinal Tap (Fictional)
- Sylvan Esso
- Tegan and Sara
- Tenacious D
- Trampled by Turtles
- Tune-Yards
- The War and Treaty
- Wye Oak
- X Ambassadors
- Young the Giant

=== DJs and instrumentalists ===
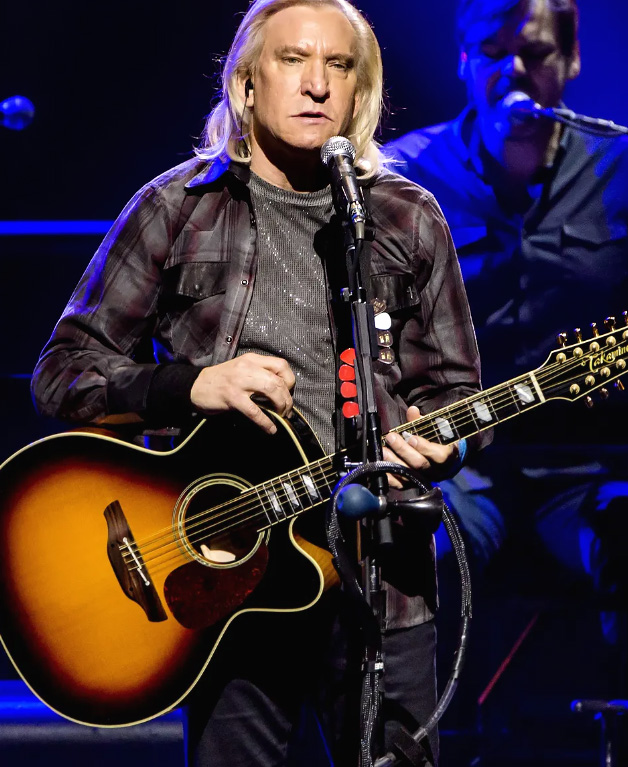
Joe Walsh

- Melissa Aldana
- Steve Aoki
- Andrew Bird
- Beverly Bond
- Hannah Bronfman
- Joe Butler
- Ravi Coltrane
- Robert Cray
- Diplo
- DJ Carnage
- DJ Cassidy
- DJ Rekha
- D-Nice
- Béla Fleck
- James Galway
- Kiran Gandhi
- Aaron Goldberg
- Herbie Hancock
- Edward W. Hardy
- Eric Harland
- Fred Hersch
- Ross Holmes
- Sean Jones
- Joe Lovano
- Yo-Yo Ma
- Joanie Madden
- Christian McBride
- Mike McCready
- Anthony McGill
- Mustard
- John Patitucci
- Itzhak Perlman
- Porter Robinson
- S. Carey
- Dave Schools
- John Scofield
- Alex Skolnick
- G. E. Smith
- Joe Walsh
- Jeff "Tain" Watts
- Brandee Younger
- Miguel Zenón

=== Rappers ===
- 2 Chainz (previously endorsed Kanye West)
- 50 Cent (previously endorsed Trump)
- Iggy Azalea
- Cardi B
- Kurtis Blow
- Common
- Cordae
- Chuck D
- Dessa
- Diddy
- Snoop Dogg
- Jermaine Dupri
- A$AP Ferg
- Lupe Fiasco
- Doug E. Fresh
- MC Hammer
- Jeezy
- Mike Jones
- Kid Cudi
- Talib Kweli
- Lil Dicky
- Lil Jon
- Lil' Kim
- Ludacris
- Pharoahe Monch
- Offset
- Papoose
- Pusha T
- Supaman
- Taboo
- T.I.
- will.i.am

=== Vocalists, singers, and songwriters ===
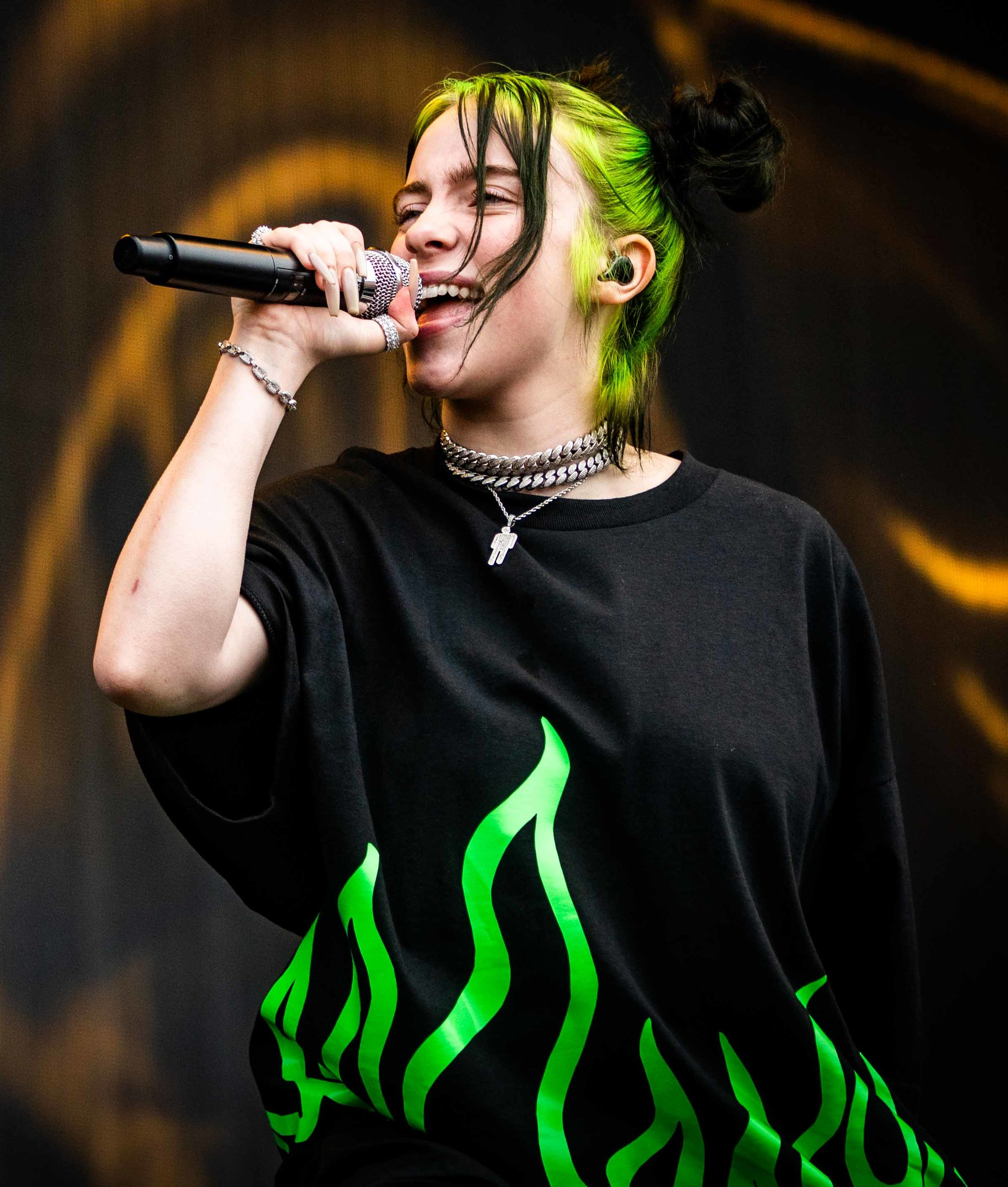
Billie Eilish

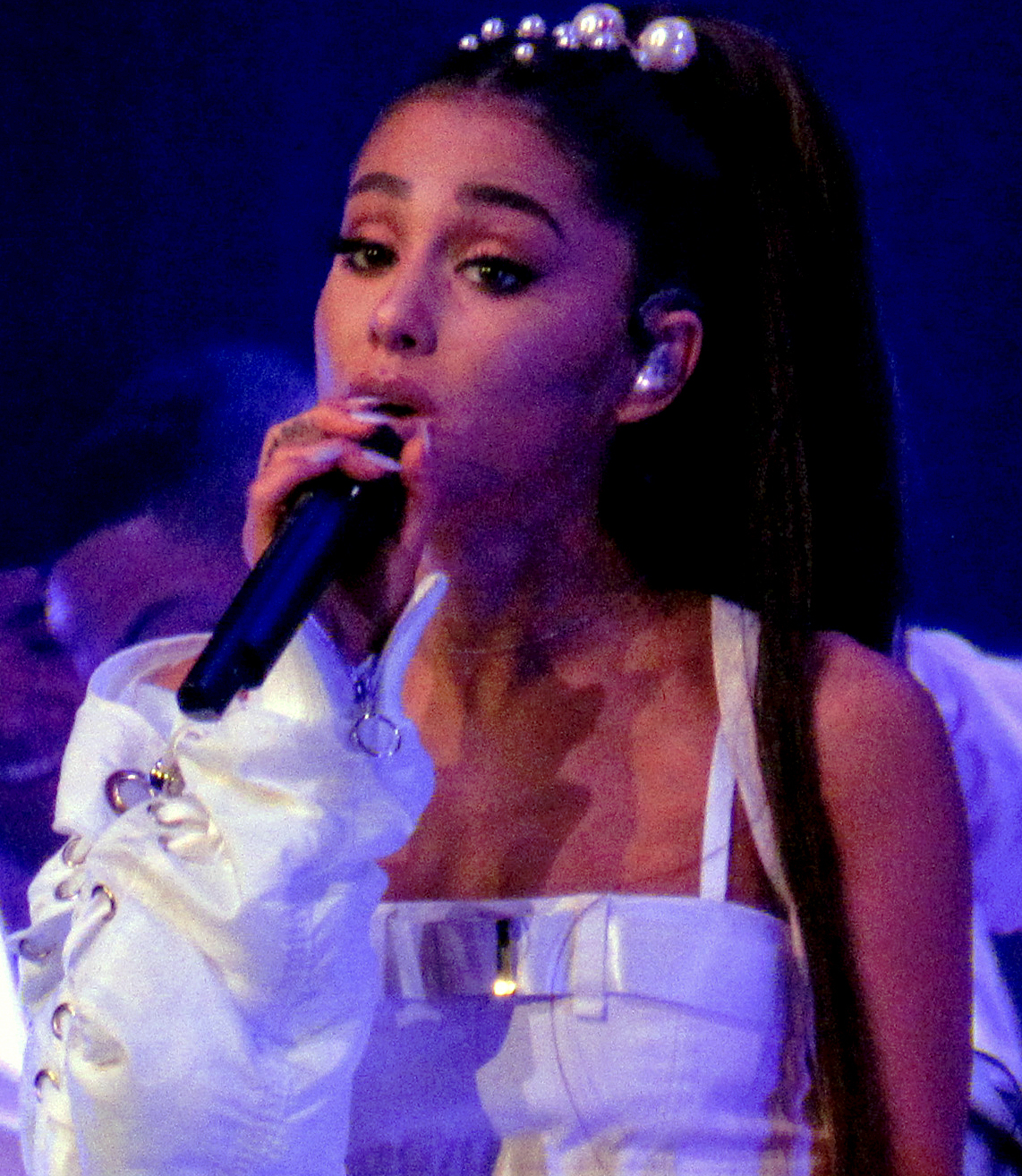
Ariana Grande

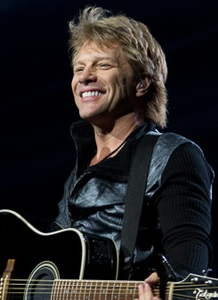
Jon Bon Jovi

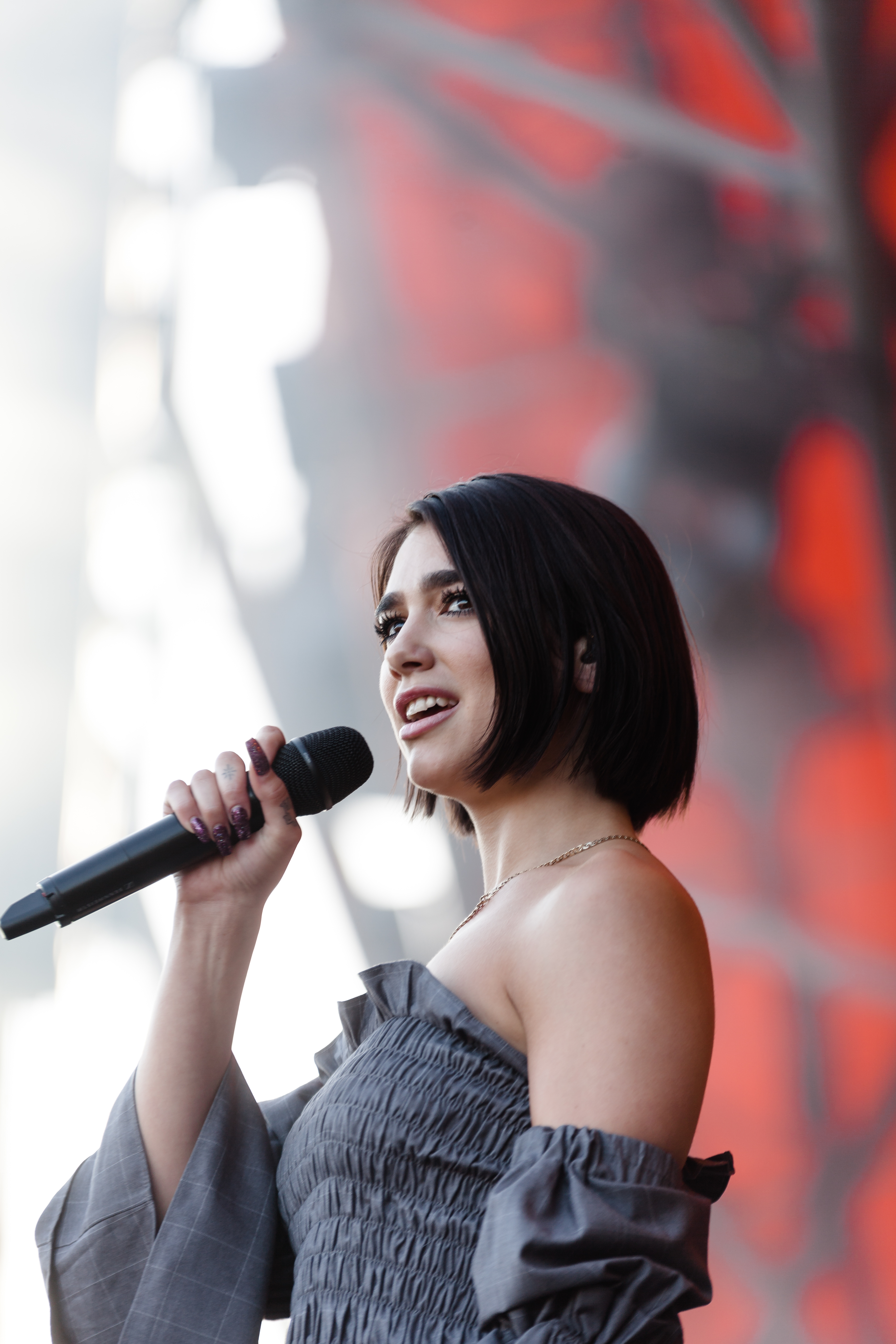
Dua Lipa

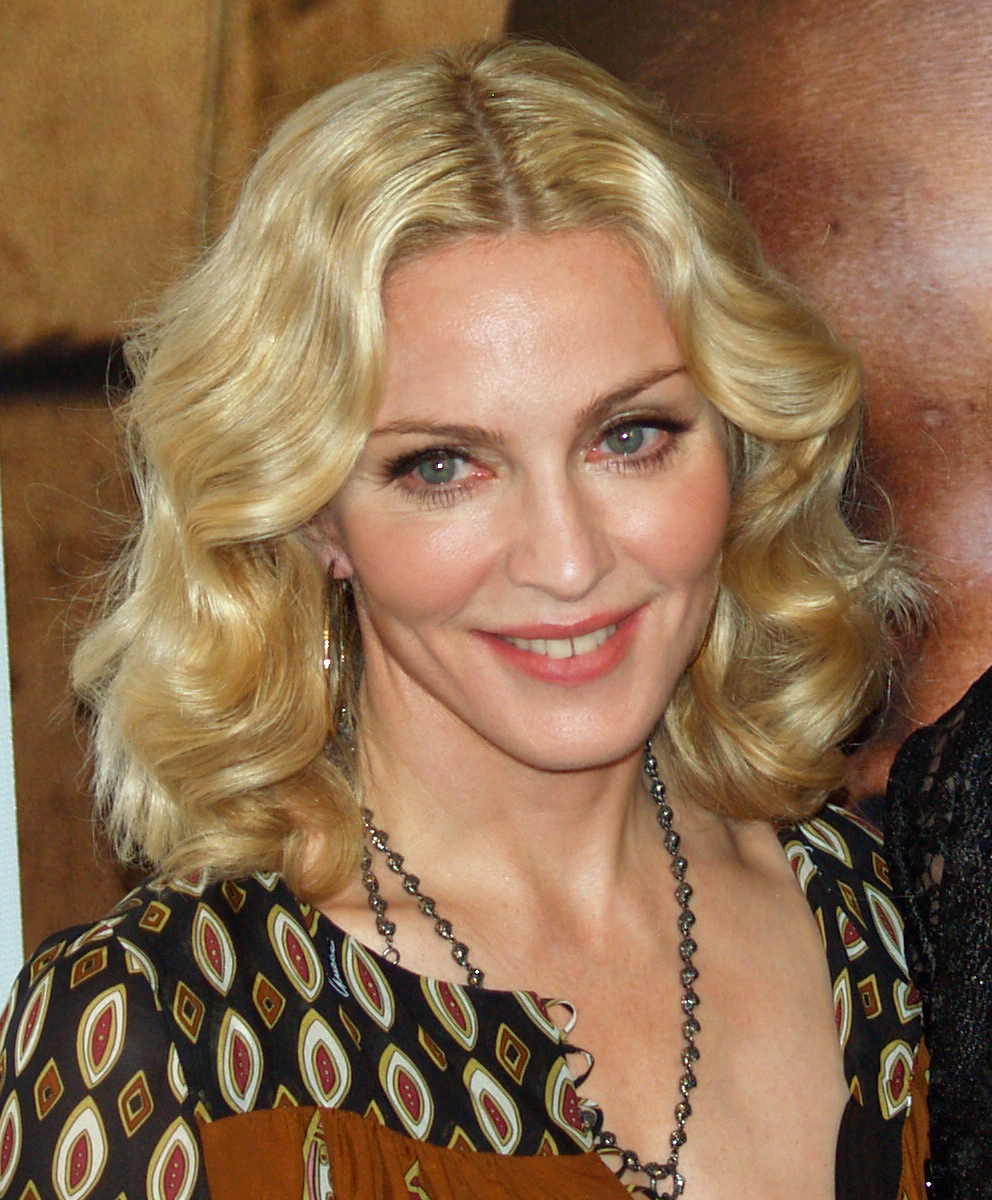
Madonna

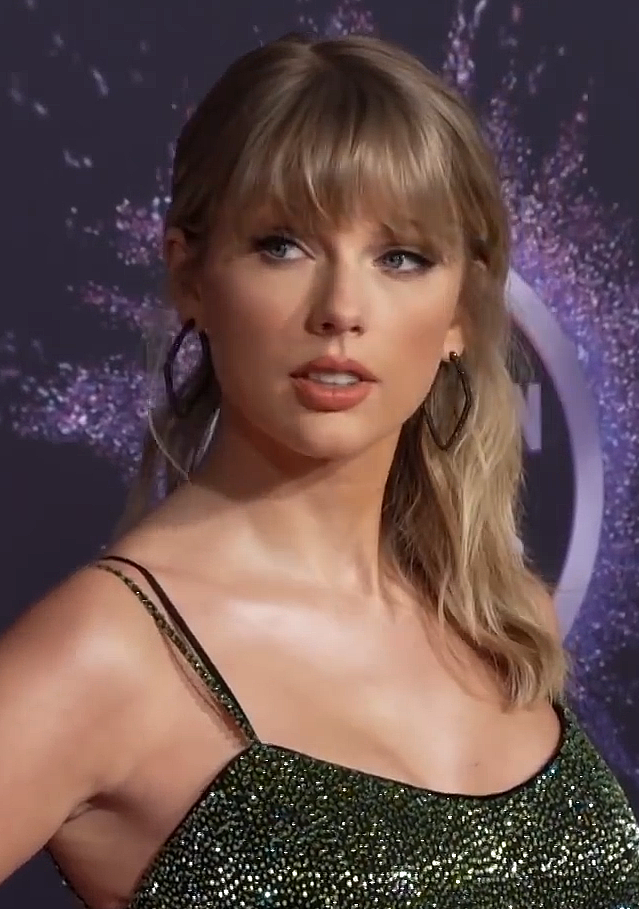
Taylor Swift

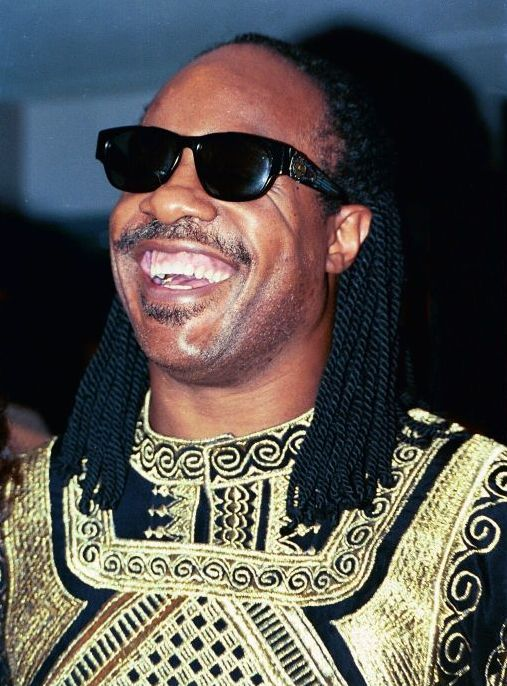
Stevie Wonder

- Arianna Afsar
- Amerie
- Marc Anthony
- Fiona Apple
- Billie Joe Armstrong
- Johntá Austin
- Sebastian Bach
- Burt Bacharach
- Sara Bareilles
- Lance Bass
- Jon Bauman
- Robert Levon Been
- Madison Beer
- LeRoy Bell
- Eric Benét
- Matt Berninger
- Frankie Beverly
- Beyoncé
- Michael Bivins
- Aloe Blacc
- Harolyn Blackwell
- Mary J. Blige
- Jon Bon Jovi
- Gary U.S. Bonds
- Leon Bridges
- Dee Dee Bridgewater
- Dolores "LaLa" Brooks
- Jimmy Buffett
- Eric Burdon
- Camila Cabello
- Erica Campbell
- Fred Cash
- Gene Chandler
- Kalen Chase
- Cher
- Ciara
- George Clinton
- Johnny Contardo
- David Crosby
- Sheryl Crow
- Maranda Curtis
- Miley Cyrus
- Andra Day
- Daya
- Raheem DeVaughn
- Lila Downs
- Huey Dunbar
- Steve Earle
- Billie Eilish
- Melissa Etheridge
- Perry Farrell
- Alejandro Fernández
- Renée Fleming
- Ben Folds
- Luis Fonsi
- Peter Frampton
- Lady Gaga
- Ben Gibbard
- Sam Gooden
- Ariana Grande
- Ellen Greene
- Dave Grohl
- Tracii Guns
- Lzzy Hale
- Halsey
- Anthony Hamilton
- Glen Hansard
- Carlie Hanson
- Don Henley
- Faith Hill
- Jazzmeia Horn
- Israel Houghton
- Tyler Hubbard
- Jennifer Hudson
- Jason Isbell
- Jim James
- Zola Jesus
- JoJo
- Nick Jonas
- Dolores "Dee Dee" Kenniebrew
- Kesha
- Alicia Keys
- Carole King
- Matthew Koma
- Damian Kulash
- Adam Lambert
- Cyndi Lauper
- Tamika Lawrence
- Amos Lee
- John Legend
- Dua Lipa
- Lissie
- Lizzo
- Lisa Loeb
- Demi Lovato
- Madonna
- MAJOR
- David Mallett
- Tamela Mann
- Peggy March
- Ricky Martin
- Vicci Martinez
- Dave Matthews
- Tim McGraw
- Colin Meloy
- Shawn Mendes
- VaShawn Mitchell
- Matt Molloy
- Mick Moloney
- Monica
- Janelle Monáe
- Maren Morris
- Mandy Moore
- Jason Mraz
- William Murphy
- Kacey Musgraves
- Kim Nalley
- Frankie Negrón
- Willie Nelson
- Ne-Yo
- Ljiljana Nikolovska
- Frank Ocean
- Finneas O'Connell
- Angel Olsen
- Amanda Palmer
- Helen Park
- Benj Pasek
- Katy Perry
- Pink
- Mike Portnoy
- Questlove
- Kermit Quinn
- Nathaniel Rateliff
- Martha Reeves
- Rikki Rockett
- Maggie Rogers
- Linda Ronstadt
- Dee Roscioli
- Axl Rose
- Charlie Rosen
- Prince Royce
- Merrilee Rush
- Marvin Sapp
- JP Saxe
- Marc Shaiman
- Shakira
- Ryan Shaw
- Mike Shinoda
- Alexis Spight
- Bruce Springsteen
- Paul Stanley
- Tommy Stinson
- Paul Stookey
- Barbra Streisand
- Harry Styles
- Bruce Sudano
- Taylor Swift
- Olga Tañón
- Shaina Taub
- James Taylor
- Kathy Taylor
- Courtney Taylor-Taylor
- Tony Terry
- Charlie Thomas
- Rob Thomas
- Justin Timberlake
- Dennis Tufano
- Molly Tuttle
- Steven Van Zandt
- Matthew Vasquez
- Kurt Vile
- Jessica Vosk
- Rufus Wainwright
- Hezekiah Walker
- Reggie Watts
- Diane Warren
- Abigail Washburn
- Bob Weir
- Pete Wentz
- Susan Werner
- Dar Williams
- Pharrell Williams
- Juan Winans
- Stevie Wonder
- Chely Wright
- Jesse Colin Young
- Neil Young
- Yungblud
- Rachel Zegler

== Sports figures ==
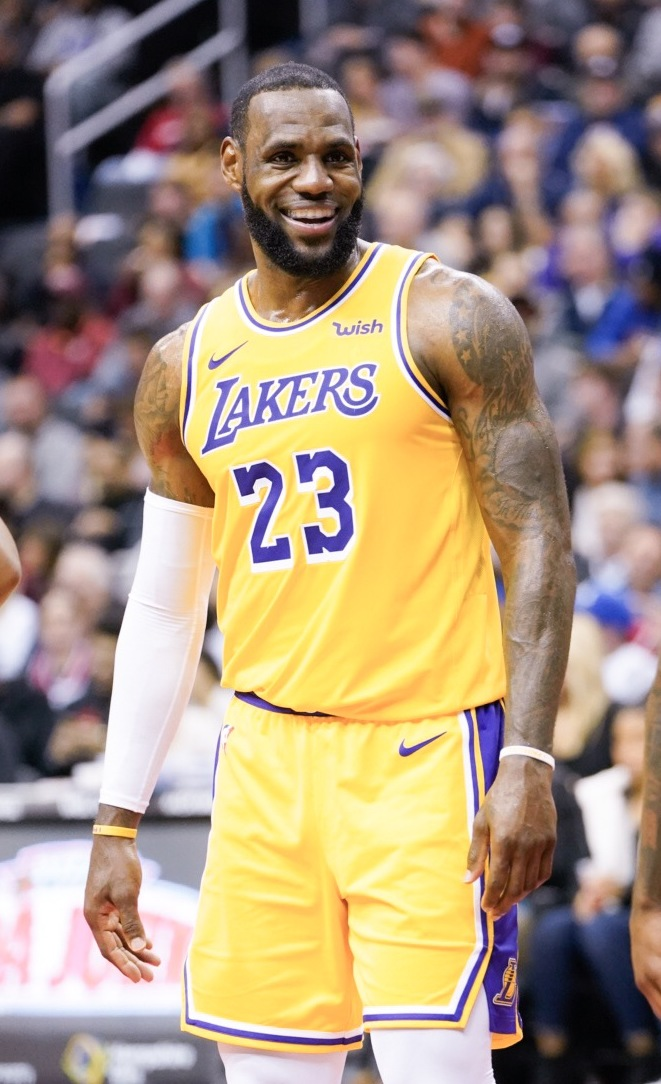
LeBron James

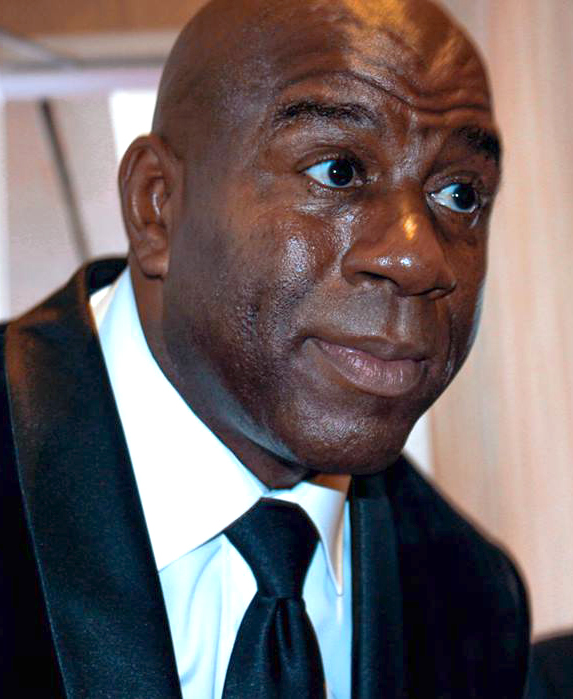
Magic Johnson

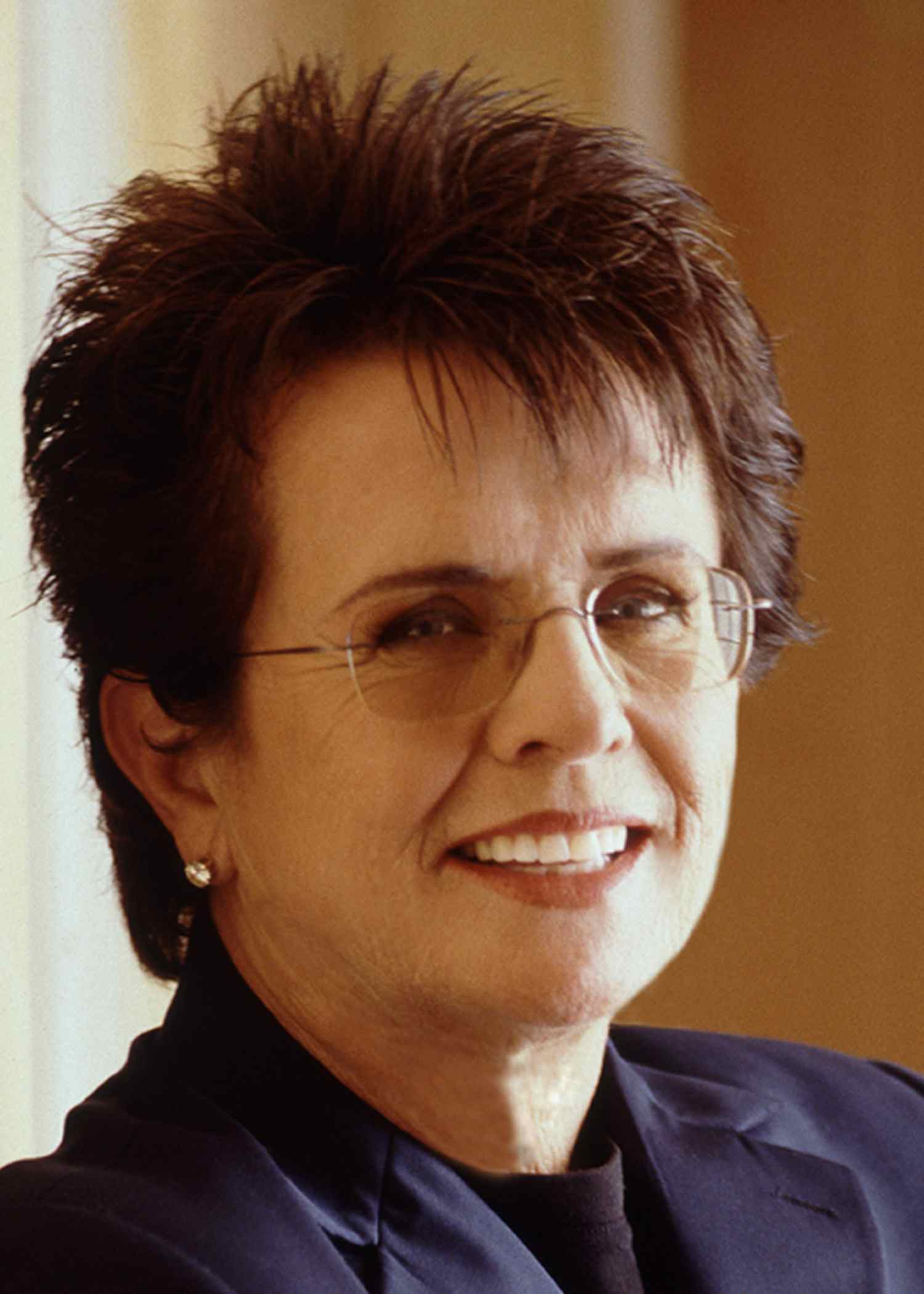
Billie Jean King

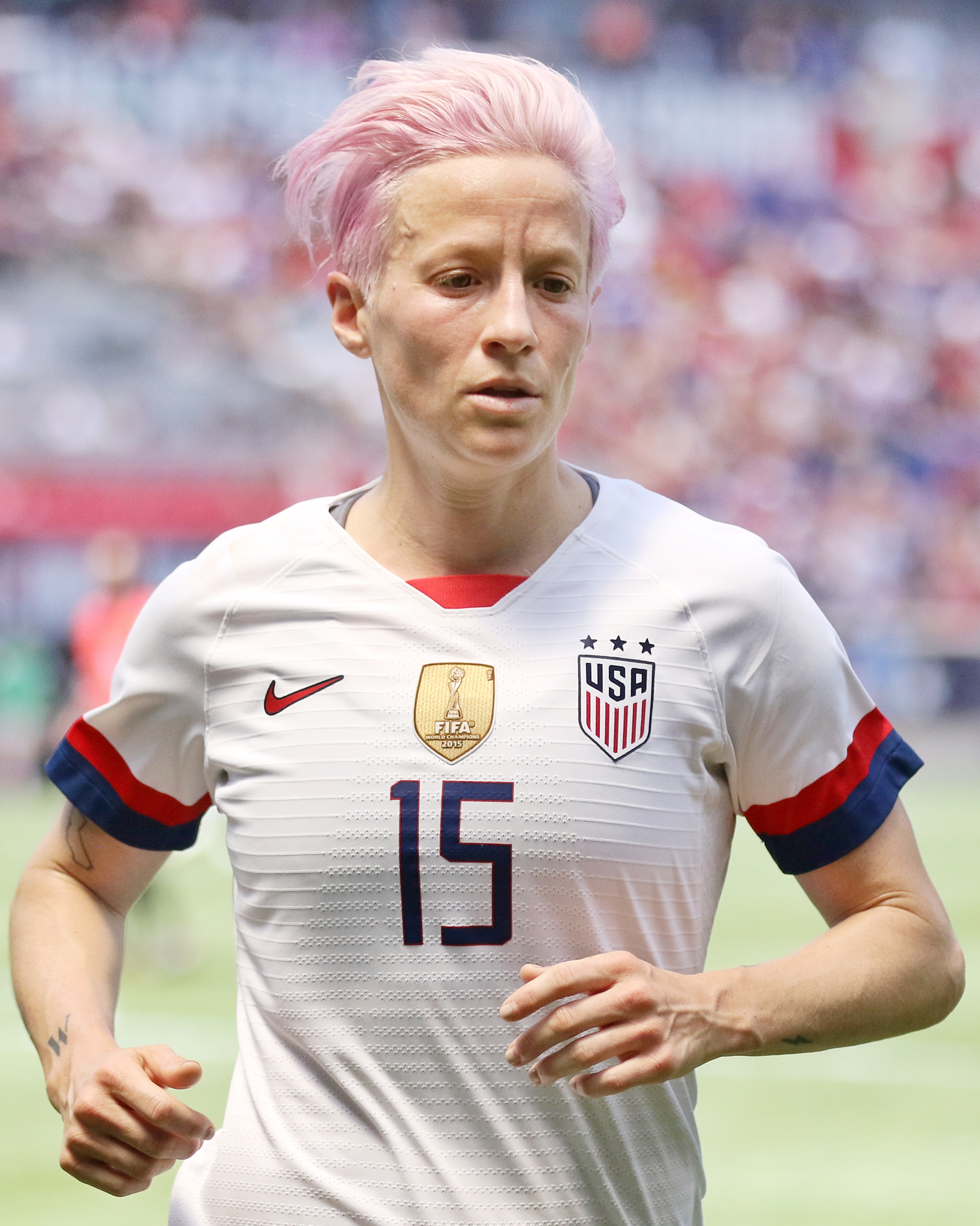
Megan Rapinoe

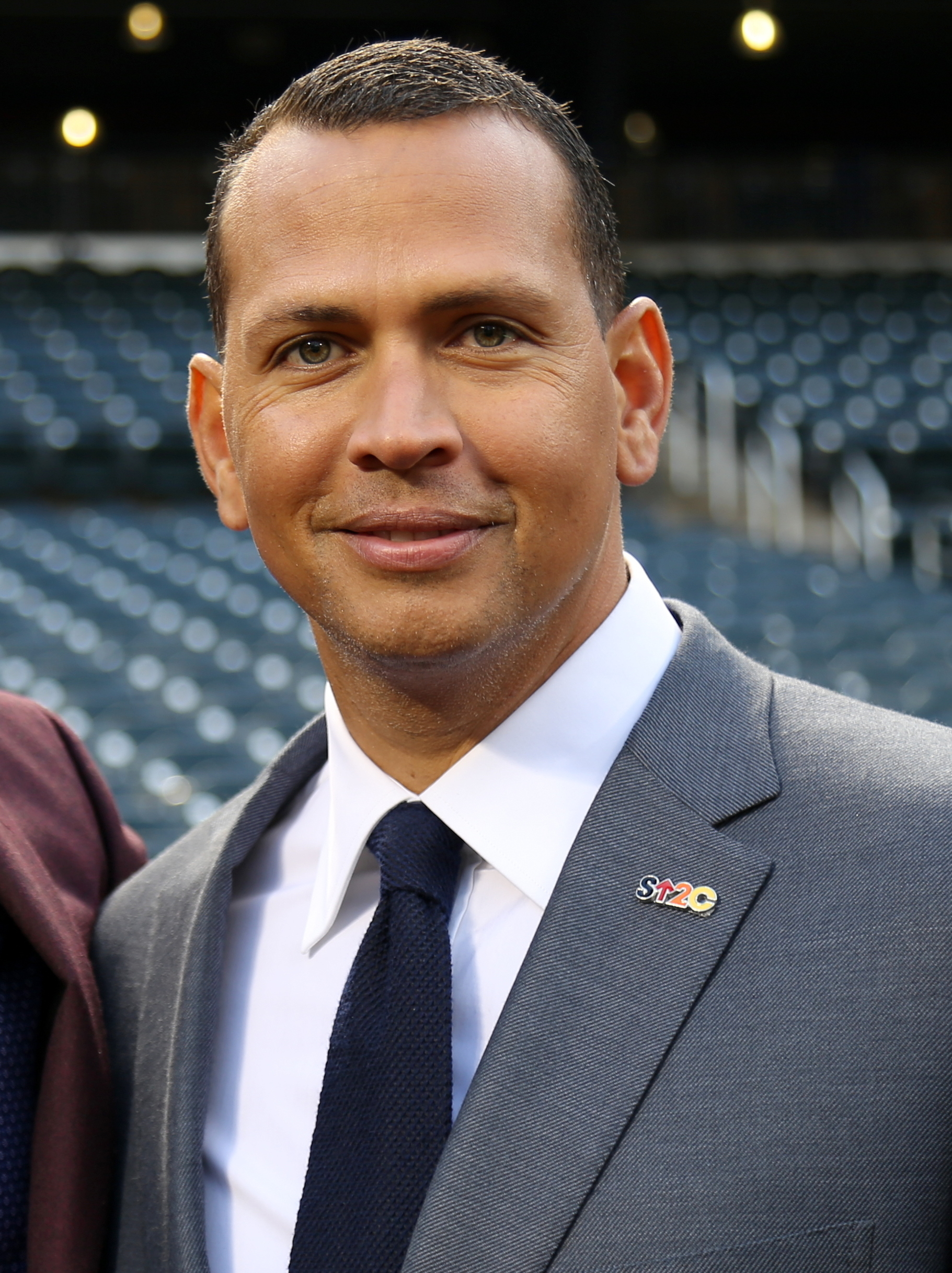
Alex Rodriguez

=== Baseball ===
- Rocco Baldelli (current manager of the Minnesota Twins)
- Alex Cora (manager and former player for the Boston Red Sox)
- Jack Flaherty (St. Louis Cardinals)
- Adrián González (former first baseman, announcer for Fox Deportes Baseball)
- Jim Pohlad (owner of the Minnesota Twins)
- Alex Rodriguez

=== Basketball ===
- Natalie Achonwa (Indiana Fever)
- Cole Anthony (Orlando Magic)
- Ray Allen
- Harrison Barnes (Sacramento Kings)
- Matt Barnes
- Jordan Bell (Minnesota Timberwolves)
- Sue Bird (Seattle Storm)
- Jaron Blossomgame (Ironi Nahariya)
- Chris Bosh
- Michael Carter-Williams (Orlando Magic)
- Rex Chapman
- Natasha Cloud (Washington Mystics)
- Layshia Clarendon (New York Liberty)
- Jason Collins
- Stephen Curry (Golden State Warriors)
- Elena Delle Donne (Washington Mystics)
- Joel Embiid (Philadelphia 76ers)
- Julius Erving
- R.J. Hampton (Denver Nuggets)
- Tobias Harris (Philadelphia 76ers)
- Udonis Haslem (Miami Heat)
- LeBron James (Los Angeles Lakers)
- Magic Johnson (former player and president of operations for the Los Angeles Lakers)
- Jonquel Jones (UMMC Ekaterinburg)
- Steve Kerr (head coach of the Golden State Warriors)
- Kara Lawson (head coach of the Duke Blue Devils women's basketball)
- Kyle Lowry (Toronto Raptors)
- CJ McCollum (Portland Trail Blazers)
- Donovan Mitchell (Utah Jazz)
- Shaquille O'Neal (former player, sports analyst on Inside the NBA)
- Candace Parker (Chicago Sky)
- Chris Paul (Oklahoma City Thunder)
- Eric Paschall (Golden State Warriors)
- Gregg Popovich (head coach of the San Antonio Spurs)
- Josh Richardson (Philadelphia 76ers)
- Doc Rivers (head coach of the Philadelphia 76ers)
- Ben Simmons
- J. R. Smith (Los Angeles Lakers)
- Dawn Staley (head coach of the South Carolina Gamecocks)
- Breanna Stewart (Seattle Storm)
- Karl-Anthony Towns (Minnesota Timberwolves)
- Brianna Turner (Phoenix Mercury)
- Stan Van Gundy, (head coach of the New Orleans Pelicans)
- Dwyane Wade
- Trae Young (Atlanta Hawks)

=== Hockey ===
- JT Brown (Tampa Bay Lightning)
- Jacob Trouba (New York Rangers)
- Blake Wheeler (Winnipeg Jets)

=== Chess ===
- Garry Kasparov (former World Chess Champion)
- Hikaru Nakamura

=== Football ===
- Nnamdi Asomugha
- Marc Badain (president of the Las Vegas Raiders)
- Bradley Chubb (Denver Broncos)
- Tommie Harris
- Calvin Johnson
- Mike Holmgren (former head coach of the Green Bay Packers and the Seattle Seahawks)
- Brandon Lloyd
- Bobby Massie
- Bill O'Brien
- Quinton Porter
- Sage Rosenfels
- Warren Sapp
- Ryan Shazier
- DeMaurice Smith (executive director of the National Football League Players Association)
- Joe Tate
- Steve Wagner
- Russell Wilson

=== Golf ===
- Alena Sharp

=== Mixed Martial Arts ===
- Mike Jackson
- Tyron Woodley

=== Poker ===
- Tony Dunst
- Tom Dwan
- Prahlad Friedman
- Matthew Glantz
- Daniel Negreanu
- Doug Polk
- Erik Seidel
- Scott Seiver
- Vanessa Selbst

=== Soccer ===
- DaMarcus Beasley (U.S. men's national soccer team)
- Crystal Dunn (Portland Thorns FC and the U.S. women's national soccer team)
- Mia Hamm (U.S. women's national soccer team)
- Ashlyn Harris (Orlando Pride)
- Stuart Holden (U.S. men's national soccer team)
- Karina LeBlanc
- Meghan Klingenberg (Portland Thorns)
- Ali Krieger (Orlando Pride)
- Alex Morgan (Tottenham Hotspur F.C. Women and the U.S. women's national soccer team)
- Megan Rapinoe (OL Reign and the U.S. women's national soccer team)
- Robbie Rogers
- Christine Sinclair
- Abby Wambach (U.S. women's national soccer team)

=== Summer sports ===
- Virginia Gilder (former rower)
- Greg Louganis (former diver)
- Natasha Wodak (former long-distance runner)

=== Tennis ===
- Gigi Fernández
- Billie Jean King (former World number 1 ranked female tennis players)
- Ilana Kloss (player, coach, and commissioner of World TeamTennis)
- Martina Navratilova

=== Winter sports ===
- Gretchen Bleiler (former professional halfpipe snowboarder)
- David Blitzer (co-owner of the Philadelphia 76ers and New Jersey Devils)
- Phill Drobnick (Director of Coaching for USA Curling)
- Caroline Gleich (skier and mountaineer)
- Michelle Kwan (figure skater)
- Adam Rippon (figure skater)

=== Wrestling ===
- Mustafa Ali
- Charly Caruso
- Sasha Banks
- Mick Foley
- Chelsea Green
- Gregory Helms
- Mickie James
- Joey Janela
- Gail Kim
- Sonny Kiss
- AJ Lee
- Kevin Nash
- Naomi
- Kevin Owens
- Paige
- Renee Paquette
- CM Punk
- Ricochet
- Brandi Rhodes
- The Iron Sheik
- Reby Sky
- Sami Zayn
- Ashley Vox
- Walter
- Xavier Woods

=== Other ===
- Carey Hart (off-road truck racer) (Republican)
- Michael Smith (former ESPN anchor)

== See also ==
- Endorsements in the 2020 Democratic Party presidential primaries
- News media endorsements in the 2020 United States presidential primaries
- News media endorsements in the 2020 United States presidential election
- List of Donald Trump 2020 presidential campaign endorsements
- List of former Trump administration officials who endorsed Joe Biden
- List of Jo Jorgensen 2020 presidential campaign endorsements
- List of Howie Hawkins 2020 presidential campaign endorsements
- List of Republicans who opposed the Donald Trump 2020 presidential campaign
