= 2026 Maine gubernatorial election =

- November 3, 2026
- Reporting: 97% as of 2:05 PM EST
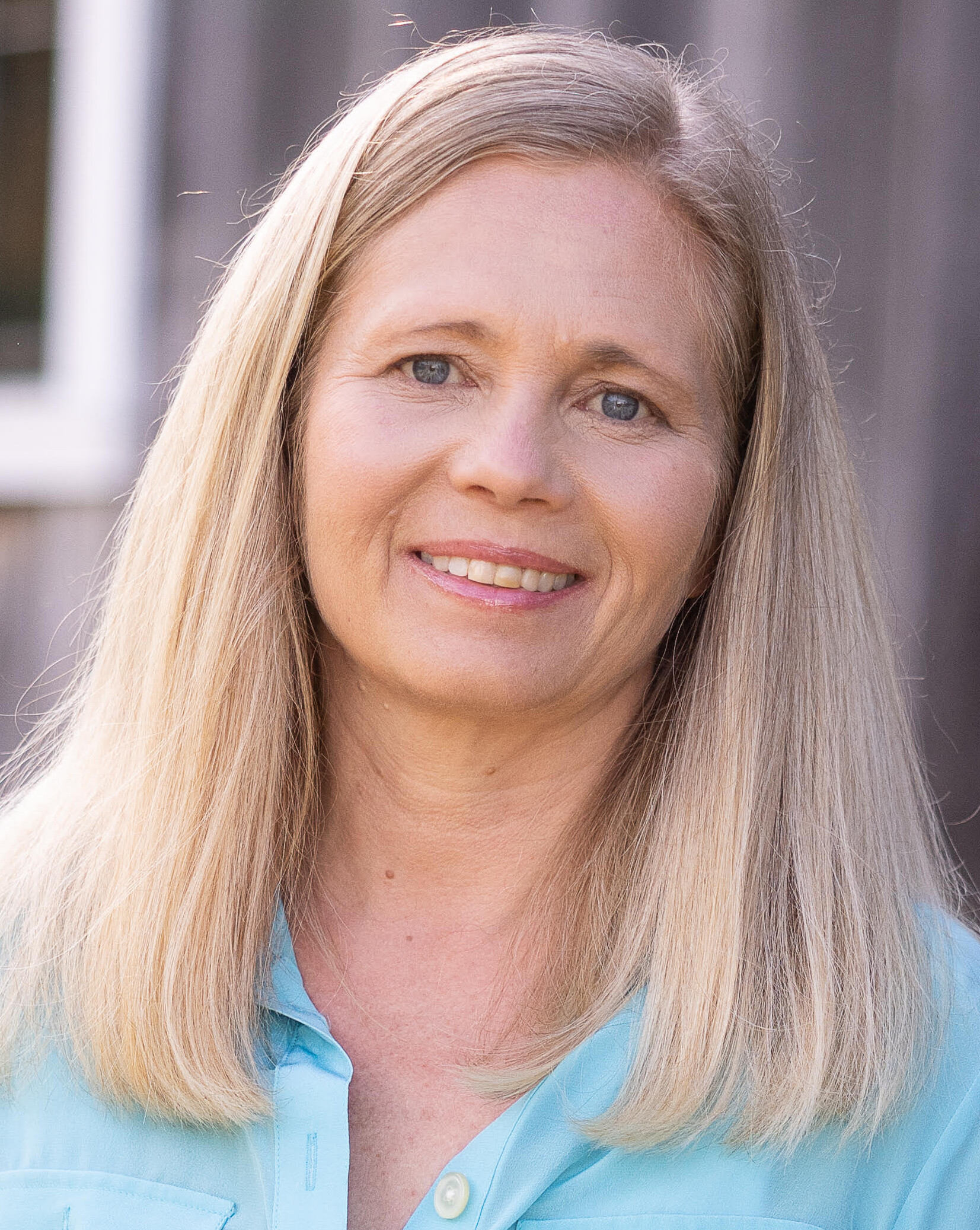

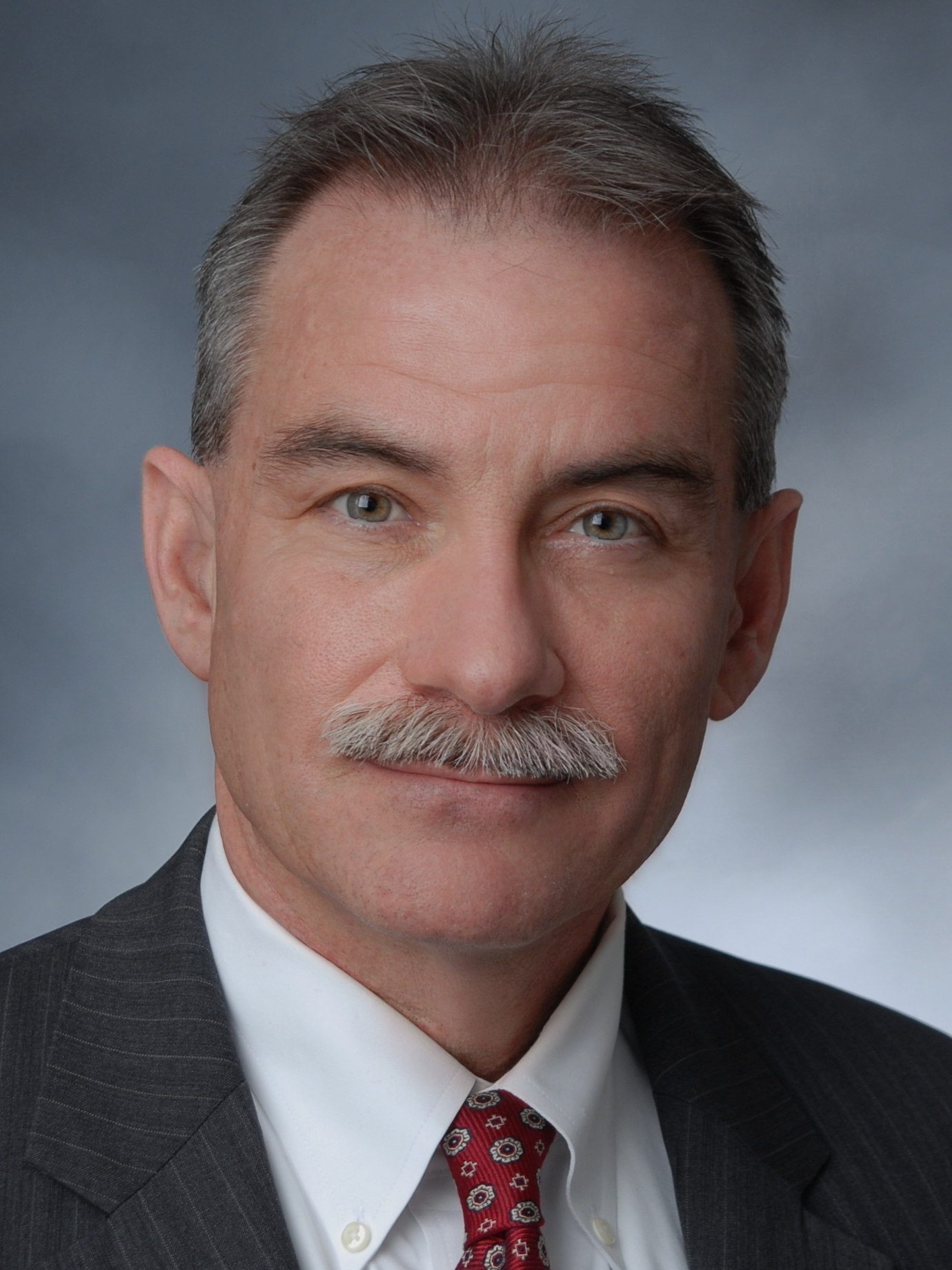

| Nominee | Hannah Pingree | Bobby Charles | Rick Bennett |
| Party | Democratic | Republican | Independent |
| Popular vote | 388,721 | 267,346 | 57,707 |
| Percentage | 54.44% | 37.44% | 8.08% |
- Pingree : 40–50% 50–60% 60–70% 70–80% 80–90% Charles: 40–50% 50–60% 60–70% 70–80% 80–90% 90–100% Tie: 40–50%
Governor before election
Janet Mills
Democratic
Elected Governor
Hannah Pingree
Democratic

The 2026 Maine gubernatorial election took place on November 3, 2026, to elect the governor of Maine. Democrat Hannah Pingree defeated Republican lawyer Bobby Charles and independent Rick Bennett.

Incumbent Democratic governor Janet Mills was ineligible to seek re-election to a third consecutive term. Although Maine has adopted ranked-choice voting, it is only used for primary elections and federal general elections. Therefore, the primary was conducted with ranked-choice voting, and the general election was conducted with the traditional plurality voting system. Primary elections were held on June 9, 2026.

This was the first Maine gubernatorial election since 1952 where the elected governor was a member of the same political party as the outgoing governor.

== Background ==
Incumbent Democratic governor Janet Mills was re-elected with 55.69% of the vote in 2022 over Republican former governor Paul LePage. She is term-limited and not eligible to run for a third consecutive term.

A sparsely populated state in New England, Maine is one of the most rural states in the nation and is considered to be moderately blue. Both houses of the Maine Legislature were controlled by the Maine Democratic Party in the prior session. A Republican has not received 50% or more of the vote in a gubernatorial election since 1962, when incumbent Republican John H. Reed received 50.08% of the vote.

== Democratic primary ==
Shenna Bellows, Troy Jackson, and Hannah Pingree announced an "alliance" on May 22, 2026, in which they would rank each other ahead of their opponents Angus King III and Nirav Shah; Shah was leading in most public polls. Shah received the most first-preference votes, with 26.8%, followed by Pingree with 23.3%, Jackson with 21.0%, Bellows with 20.7%, and King with 8.2%. As a result of finishing last, King was eliminated and his voters' second preferences were redistributed to the remaining four candidates. Pingree was ultimately nominated after four rounds of ranked-choice tabulation, defeating Shah in the final round by a 56%–44% margin.

Following his loss in the gubernatorial primary, Troy Jackson became the Democratic nominee in the 2026 United States Senate election after former nominee Graham Platner withdrew from the race.

=== Candidates ===
==== Nominee ====
- Hannah Pingree, former director of the Maine Governor's Office of Policy Innovation, former Speaker of the Maine House of Representatives (2008–2010) from the 36th district (2002–2010), and daughter of U.S. Representative Chellie Pingree

==== Eliminated in primary ====
- Shenna Bellows, Maine Secretary of State (2021–present) and nominee for U.S. Senate in 2014
- Troy Jackson, former President of the Maine Senate (2018–2024) and candidate for Maine's 2nd congressional district in 2014
- Angus King III, energy executive and son of U.S. Senator and former governor Angus King
- Nirav Shah, former principal deputy director of the Centers for Disease Control and Prevention (2023–2025) and former director of the Maine CDC (2019–2023)

==== Failed to qualify ====
- Kenneth Pinet, retired hotel worker

==== Withdrawn ====
- Jason Cherry, attorney and independent candidate for U.S. Senate in 2024 (ran for state House)

==== Declined ====
- Joe Baldacci, state senator (2020–present) and brother of former governor John Baldacci (ran for U.S. House, endorsed Jackson)
- Jared Golden, U.S. representative from Maine's 2nd congressional district (2019–present)
- Dan Kleban, brewer (ran for U.S. Senate)
- Adam Lee, car dealer

=== Endorsements ===
Shenna Bellows

State legislators

- Troy Jackson, candidate for governor in 2026, former President of the Maine Senate (2018–2024) (second choice co-endorsement with Pingree)
- Hannah Pingree, candidate for governor in 2026, former Speaker of the Maine House of Representatives (2008–2010) (second choice co-endorsement with Jackson)
- Denise Tepler, state senator for the 24th district (2024–present) (co-endorsement with Pingree)

Individuals

- Graham Platner, Sullivan harbor master, candidate for U.S. Senate in 2026 (second choice co-endorsement with Pingree)

Labor unions

- Maine Education Association (first choice)
- MSEA-SEIU Local 1989 (second choice)

Organizations

- Maine People's Alliance
- Sierra Club of Maine (co-endorsement with Jackson and Pingree)
Troy Jackson

U.S. senators

- Bernie Sanders, Vermont (2007–present) (Independent)

U.S. representatives

- Ro Khanna, CA-17 (2017–present)

Statewide officials

- Shenna Bellows, candidate for governor in 2026, Maine secretary of state (2021–present) (second choice co-endorsement with Pingree)
- Michael E. Carpenter, former attorney general of Maine (1991–1995)

State legislators

- Joe Baldacci, state senator from the 9th district (2020–present) and 2026 candidate for ME-02
- Andy O'Brien, former state representative from the 44th district (2008–2012)
- Hannah Pingree, candidate for governor in 2026, former Speaker of the Maine House of Representatives (2008–2010) (second choice co-endorsement with Bellows)

Local officials

- Mark Dion, mayor of Portland (2023–present)

Individuals

- Graham Platner, Sullivan harbor master, candidate for U.S. Senate in 2026 (first choice)

Labor unions

- American Postal Workers Union Local 536
- Professional Firefighters of Maine
- International Association of Machinists and Aerospace Workers Maine State Council
- International Brotherhood of Teamsters New England Joint Council 10 and Local 340
- Maine AFL-CIO
- Maine Building & Construction Trades Council
- Maine Education Association (second choice)
- Maine State Nurses Association
- MSEA-SEIU Local 1989 (first choice)
- Portsmouth Naval Shipyard Metal Trades Council

Organizations

- Maine Democratic Socialists of America
- Our Revolution
- Sierra Club of Maine (co-endorsement with Bellows and Pingree)
Angus King III

U.S. senators

- Angus King, Maine (2013–present) (Independent; candidate's father)
Hannah Pingree

Executive branch officials

- Jeanne Lambrew, former deputy director of the White House Office of Health Reform (2009–2011) and commissioner of the Maine Department of Health and Human Services (2019–2024)

Statewide officials

- Shenna Bellows, candidate for governor in 2026, Maine secretary of state (2021–present) (second choice co-endorsement with Jackson)
- Aaron Frey, Maine attorney general (2019–present)
- Janet Mills, governor of Maine (2019–present)
- Abigail Spanberger, governor of Virginia (2026–present)

State legislators

- Lynn Bromley, former state senator from the 7th district (2000–2008)
- Mark Eves, former speaker of the Maine House of Representatives (2012–2016) from the 6th district (2008–2016)
- Ryan Fecteau, speaker of the Maine House of Representatives (2020–2022, 2024–present) from the 132nd district (2014–2022, 2024–present)
- Drew Gattine, state representative from the 34th district (2012–2020) and 126th district (2022–present)
- Brian Hubbell, former state representative from the 135th district (2012–2020)
- Troy Jackson, candidate for governor in 2026, former President of the Maine Senate (2018–2024) (second choice co-endorsement with Bellows)
- Matt Moonen, majority leader of the Maine House of Representatives (2018–2020, 2024–present) from the 17th district (2022–present) and 38th district (2012–2020)
- Linda Sanborn, former state senator (2018–2020)
- Eloise Vitelli, former majority leader of the Maine Senate (2021–2024) from the 24th district (2013–2014, 2016–2024)
- Denise Tepler, state senator for the 24th district (2024–present) (co-endorsement with Bellows)

Individuals

- Stephen King, author
- Graham Platner, Sullivan harbor master, candidate for U.S. Senate in 2026 (second choice co-endorsement with Bellows)

Organizations

- Maine Conservation Voters
- Sierra Club of Maine (co-endorsement with Bellows and Jackson)
- Vote Mama
Nirav Shah

Local officials

- Carl Sheline, mayor of Lewiston (2022–present)

Labor unions

- Maine Education Association (third choice)

Organizations

- 314 Action

=== Fundraising ===
Italics indicates a withdrawn or disqualified candidate

Campaign finance reports as of May 28, 2026
| Candidate | Raised | Spent | Cash on hand |
|---|---|---|---|
| Shenna Bellows (D) | $1,788,987.24 | $1,447,114.88 | $367,068.15 |
| Jason Cherry (D) (Note: Withdrawn candidate) | $0.00 | $0.00 | $0.00 |
| Troy Jackson (D) | $981,248.74 | $747,698.62 | $255,494.07 |
| Angus King III (D) | $1,921,242.73 | $1,692,317.07 | $228,925.66 |
| Kenneth Forrest Pinet (D) | $775.00 | $775.00 | $0.00 |
| Hannah Pingree (D) | $2,123,468.39 | $1,030,453.75 | $420,028.18 |
| Nirav Shah (D) | $1,241,045.91 | $944,715.86 | $288,331.47 |
Source: Maine Ethics Commission

=== Polling ===
| Poll source | Date(s) administered | Sample size (Note: Key: A – all adults RV – registered voters LV – likely voters V – unclear) | Margin of error | Round | Shenna Bellows | Troy Jackson | Angus King III | Hannah Pingree | Nirav Shah | Other | Undecided |
|---|---|---|---|---|---|---|---|---|---|---|---|
| SurveyUSA | May 28 – June 3, 2026 | 484 (Note: Sample includes a mix of likely and actual voters.) | ± 5.4% | Round 1 | 11% | 20% | 14% | 19% | 25% | – | 11% |
| SurveyUSA | May 28 – June 3, 2026 | 484 | ± 5.4% | Round 2 | – | N/A (Note: The candidates' percentages in the second round of the poll are not explicitly stated.) | | | | – | – |
| SurveyUSA | May 28 – June 3, 2026 | 484 | ± 5.4% | Round 3 | – | 31% | – | 33% | 36% | – | – |
| SurveyUSA | May 28 – June 3, 2026 | 484 | ± 5.4% | Round 4 | – | – | – | 52% | 48% | – | – |
| University of New Hampshire | May 21–25, 2026 | 595 (LV) | ± 4.0% | – | 13% | 28% | 7% | 12% | 28% | 1% (Note: "Another candidate" with 1%) | 11% |
| Impact Research | May 19–21, 2026 | 500 (LV) | ± 4.4% | – | 15% | 24% | 9% | 16% | 32% | – | 4% |
| Pan Atlantic Research | May 8–18, 2026 | 402 (LV) | – | – | 10% | 12% | 24% | 9% | 29% | – | 16% |
| GQR (D) (Note: Poll sponsored by Pingree's campaign.) | May 6–9, 2026 | 500 (LV) | – | – | 18% | 15% | 12% | 20% | 32% | – | 3% |
| Schoen Cooperman Research (D) (Note: Poll sponsored by 314 Action, which has endorsed Shah's campaign.) | April 30 – May 4, 2026 | 522 (LV) | – | – | 16% | 13% | 21% | 15% | 28% | – | 7% |
| Impact Research (D) (Note: Poll sponsored by Jackson's campaign.) | March 19–23, 2026 | 500 (LV) | ± 4.4% | – | 17% | 18% | 9% | 16% | 31% | – | 6% |
| Pan Atlantic Research | February 13 – March 2, 2026 | 367 (LV) | – | – | 16% | 10% | 24% | 18% | 24% | 10% (Note: Jason Cherry with 6%, Kenneth Pinet with 4%) | – |
| University of New Hampshire | February 12–16, 2026 | 462 (LV) | ± 4.5% | – | 19% | 16% | 5% | 10% | 25% | 1% (Note: "Another candidate" with 1%; Kenneth Pinet with 0%) | 23% |
| Hart Research (D) (Note: Poll sponsored by Shah's campaign.) | January 15–19, 2026 | 502 (LV) | ± 4.5% | – | 11% | 9% | 13% | 13% | 35% | – | 18% |
| Pan Atlantic Research | November 29 – December 7, 2025 | 318 (LV) | ± 6.1% | – | 16% | 8% | 19% | 18% | 24% | – | 15% |
| GQR (D) | October 2025 | – | – | – | 24% | 14% | 15% | 16% | 16% | – | 16% |
| Pan Atlantic Research | May 12–26, 2025 | 325 (LV) | ± 6.1% | – | 24% | 13% | 33% | 20% | – | – | 10% |

=== Debates ===
2026 Maine gubernatorial election Democratic primary debates
| No. | Date | Host | Moderator | Link | Democratic | Democratic | Democratic | Democratic | Democratic |
| Key: P Participant A Absent N Not invited I Invited W Withdrawn | | | | | | | | | |
| Key: P Participant A Absent N Not invited I Invited W Withdrawn | | | | | Shenna Bellows | Troy Jackson | Angus King III | Hannah Pingree | Nirav Shah |
|---|---|---|---|---|---|---|---|---|---|
| 1 | April 30, 2026 | WMTW-TV; WABI-TV; WAGM-TV | Terry Stackhouse | YouTube | P | P | P | P | P |
| 2 | May 5, 2026 | WGME-TV; Bangor Daily News | Gregg Lagerquist; Mike Shepherd | YouTube | P | P | P | P | P |
| 3 | May 14, 2026 | WCSH-TV | Rob Caldwell; Phil Hirschkorn | YouTube | P | P | P | P | P |

=== Results ===
First round results by county Shah: 20–30%; Pingree: 30–40%; Jackson: 20–30%; 50–60%; Bellows: 30–40%

First round results by town Shah: 20–30%; 30–40%; 40–50%; 50–60%; 60–70%; 80–90%; Pingree: 20–30%; 30–40%; 40–50%; 50–60%; 60–70%; 70–80%; 80–90%; Jackson: 20–30%; 30–40%; 40–50%; 50–60%; 60–70%; 70–80%; 80–90%; >90%; Bellows: 20–30%; 30–40%; 40–50%; 50–60%; 60–70%; >90%; King: 30–40%; 60–70%; >90%; Tie: 20–30%; 30–40%; 40–50%; 50%; No Votes

The Maine gubernatorial election uses instant-runoff voting as its algorithm: in each round, the candidate with the fewest first-preference votes among the remaining candidates is eliminated, and each ballot which was formerly voting for that candidate is transferred to its new first preference. This necessarily results in a number of rounds equal to 1 less than the number of candidates.

Democratic primary results
| Party | Candidate | Round 1 | | | Round 2 | | | Round 3 | | | Round 4 | |
| Party | Candidate | Votes | % | Transfer | Votes | % | Transfer | Votes | % | Transfer | Votes | % |
|---|---|---|---|---|---|---|---|---|---|---|---|---|
| Democratic | Hannah Pingree | 50,552 | 23.3 | + 4,808 | 55,360 | 26.0 | + 20,311 | 75,671 | 36.3 | + 36,079 | 111,750 | 56.2 |
| Democratic | Nirav Shah | 58,606 | 26.8 | + 4,255 | 62,860 | 29.5 | + 9,821 | 72,681 | 34.8 | + 14,269 | 86,950 | 43.8 |
| Democratic | Troy Jackson | 45,959 | 21.1 | + 1,638 | 47,597 | 22.3 | + 12,413 | 60,010 | 28.8 | 60,010 | Eliminated | |
| Democratic | Shenna Bellows | 44,770 | 20.6 | + 2,279 | 47,049 | 22.1 | 47,049 | Eliminated | | | | |
| Democratic | Angus King III | 17,860 | 8.3 | 17,860 | Eliminated | | | | | | | |
| Continuing ballots | | 217,747 | 100.0 | | 212,848 | 97.8 | | 208,542 | 95.7 | | 198,700 | 91.1 |
| Exhausted ballots | | – | | +4,881 | 4,881 | 2.2 | + 4,504 | 9,385 | 4.3 | + 9,662 | 19,047 | 8.9 |
| Total votes | | 217,747 | 100.0 | | 217,747 | 100.0 | | 217,747 | 100.0 | | 217,747 | 100.0 |

== Republican primary ==
All Republican candidates said that they opposed ranked choice voting. Robert Charles was particularly critical of ranked choice voting and encouraged Republican primary voters to rank him across the ballot and not rank other candidates. Charles criticized what he called "back room deals" among other candidates to encourage their supporters to rank another candidate second, claiming other candidates could not be trusted to work to repeal ranked choice voting while encouraging its use. The candidates who endorsed a second choice were Robert Wessels, who endorsed Jonathan Bush as his second choice, Ben Midgley, who endorsed David Jones as his second choice, and David Jones, who endorsed Midgley as his second choice.

Charles would win 37.7% of the vote, with Midgley and Bush finishing with 20.1% and 19.8% respectively, and every other candidate some distance behind them. State senator James Libby, who had suspended his campaign in April but did not formally withdrawn from the race, finished in last. After seven rounds of ranked-choice voting tabulation, Charles was declared the winner.

=== Candidates ===
==== Nominee ====
- Bobby Charles, lawyer and former U.S. Assistant Secretary of State (2003–2005)

==== Eliminated in primary ====
- Jonathan Bush, healthcare executive and nephew of former president George H. W. Bush
- Garrett Mason, former majority leader of the Maine Senate and candidate for governor in 2018
- Ben Midgley, former CEO of Crunch Fitness
- David Jones, real estate executive and independent candidate for governor in 2006
- Owen McCarthy, University of Maine System trustee
- Robert Wessels, former Paris selectman

==== Failed to qualify ====
- Ken Capron, retired accountant
- David J. Foster
- Randy Lee Wilcox

==== Withdrawn ====
- James Libby, state senator and candidate for governor in 2002 (endorsed Bush; remained on ballot)
- Steven Sheppard, rapper

==== Declined ====
- Rick Bennett, state senator, former President of the Maine Senate, and candidate for U.S. Senate in 2012 (running as an Independent)
- Laurel Libby, state representative from the 90th district (2022–present) and the 64th district (2020–2022)
- Shawn Moody, businessperson, nominee for governor in 2018, independent candidate for governor in 2010 (initially formed exploratory committee)
- Ray Richardson, political analyst and radio host

=== Endorsements ===
Jonathan Bush

Federal officials

- Peter Cianchette, former U.S. ambassador to Costa Rica (2008–2009), Republican nominee for governor in 2002

State legislators

- James Libby, state senator from the 34th district (1996–2000) and 22nd district (2022–present), candidate for governor in 2002 and 2026

Individuals

- Billy Bush, television host (candidate's brother)
- Robert Wessels, candidate for governor in 2026 (second choice)
Bobby Charles

U.S. representatives

- Newt Gingrich, former speaker of the House (1995–1999) from GA-06 (1979–1999)
David Jones

Individuals

- Ben Midgley, businessman and 2026 candidate for governor (second choice)
Garrett Mason

State legislators

- Wayne R. Parry, state representative for the 10th district (2010–2018, 2020–2022) and 140th district (2022–present)
Ben Midgley

Individuals

- David Jones, real estate executive and 2026 candidate for governor (second choice)

=== Fundraising ===
Italics indicates a withdrawn or disqualified candidate

Campaign finance reports as of May 28, 2026
| Candidate | Raised | Spent | Cash on hand |
|---|---|---|---|
| Jonathan Bush (R) | $1,709,651.00 | $2,439,491.69 | $131,659.31 |
| Kenneth Capron (R) | $3,511.30 | $3,316.87 | $194.43 |
| David J. Foster (R) | $0.00 | $0.00 | $0.00 |
| Bobby Charles (R) | $1,020,570.20 | $819,932.18 | $277,293.30 |
| David Jones (R) | $529,512.02 | $401,943.87 | $123,617.44 |
| James Libby (R) | $17,025.00 | $17,010.39 | $98.76 |
| Owen McCarthy (R) | $386,142.23 | $405,804.00 | $115,275.00 |
| Ben Midgley (R) | $322,263.00 | $626,642.18 | $445,620.82 |
| Robert Wessels (R) | $61,162.47 | $41,868.01 | $19,162.91 |
Source: Maine Ethics Commission

=== Polling ===
| Poll source | Date(s) administered | Sample size | Margin of error | Jonathan Bush | Robert Charles | David Jones | James Libby | Garrett Mason | Owen McCarthy | Ben Midgley | Robert Wessels | Other | Undecided |
|---|---|---|---|---|---|---|---|---|---|---|---|---|---|
| SurveyUSA (Note: Poll sponsored by the Bangor Daily News and FairVote) | May 28 – June 3, 2026 | 466 (LV) | ± 5.7% | 17% | 34% | 2% | 0% | 10% | 7% | 11% | 2% | – | 18% |
| University of New Hampshire | May 21–25, 2026 | 465 (LV) | ± 6.3% | 18% | 37% | 7% | – | 9% | 2% | 11% | 6% | 0% (Note: "Another candidate" with 0%) | 9% |
| Pan Atlantic Research | May 8–18, 2026 | 287 (LV) | – | 20% | 36% | 20% | – | 13% | 4% | 2% | 1% | – | 21% |
| McLaughlin & Associates (R) (Note: Poll sponsored by Charles' campaign.) | April 28 – April 30, 2026 | 300 (LV) | ± 5.7% | 11% | 47% | 2% | – | 11% | 2% | 10% | 2% | – | 16% |
| | April 9, 2026 | Libby withdraws | | | | | | | | | | | |
| Pan Atlantic Research | February 13 – March 2, 2026 | 298 (LV) | – | 4% | 26% | 6% | 8% | 11% | 7% | 4% | – | – | 34% |
| University of New Hampshire | February 12–16, 2026 | 404 (LV) | ± 4.9% | 5% | 28% | 7% | 2% | 12% | 1% | 6% | 4% | 3% (Note: "Another candidate" with 3%) | 31% |
| Pan Atlantic Research | November 29 – December 7, 2025 | 312 (LV) | ± 6.1% | 5% | 16% | 6% | 3% | – | 2% | – | – | – | 68% |
| McLaughlin & Associates (R) | August 23–25, 2025 | 300 (LV) | ± 4.0% | 4% | 28% | 2% | 1% | 1% | 2% | 0.3% | 3% | 23% (Note: Shawn Moody with 23%) | 34% |

Hypothetical polling

| Poll source | Date(s) administered | Sample size | Margin of error | Rick Bennett | Jonathan Bush | Robert Charles | Laurel Libby | Garrett Mason | Shawn Moody | Bruce Poliquin | Trey Stewart |
|---|---|---|---|---|---|---|---|---|---|---|---|
| Pan Atlantic Research | May 12–26, 2025 | 293 (LV) | ± 8.4% | 14% | 9% | 14% | 27% | 10% | 21% | 23% | 10% |

=== Debates ===
2026 Maine gubernatorial election Republican primary debates
| No. | Date | Host | Moderator | Link | Republican | Republican | Republican | Republican | Republican | Republican | Republican |
| Key: P Participant A Absent N Not invited I Invited W Withdrawn | | | | | | | | | | | |
| Key: P Participant A Absent N Not invited I Invited W Withdrawn | | | | | Jonathan Bush | Robert Charles | David Jones | Garrett Mason | Ben Midgley | Owen McCarthy | Robert Wessels |
|---|---|---|---|---|---|---|---|---|---|---|---|
| 1 | May 5, 2026 | WMTW-TV | Jon Chrisos | YouTube | P | A | P | P | P | P | P |
| 2 | May 7, 2026 | Bangor Daily News; WGME-TV | Gregg Lagerquist; Mike Shepherd | YouTube | P | A | P | P | P | P | N |
| 2 | May 14, 2026 | WCSH-TV | Rob Caldwell; Phil Hirschkorn | YouTube | P | P | P | P | P | P | P |

=== Convention vote ===
On April 25, 2026, the Maine Republican Party announced the results of a straw poll by delegates to the Maine Republican Convention. Robert Charles was declared the winner. Unlike the primary, the straw poll was conducted without ranked-choice voting, and was non-binding.

==== Results ====
Republican convention straw poll results
| Party | Candidate | Votes | % |
|---|---|---|---|
| Republican | Robert Charles | 269 | 31.87% |
| Republican | Ben Midgley | 230 | 27.25% |
| Republican | Jonathan Bush | 96 | 11.37% |
| Republican | Garrett Mason | 76 | 9.00% |
| Republican | Owen McCarthy | 74 | 8.77% |
| Republican | Robert Wessels | 54 | 6.34% |
| Republican | David Jones | 45 | 5.33% |
| Total votes | | 844 | 100.00% |

=== Results ===
Republican primary results
| Party | Candidate | Round 1 | | | Round 2 | | | Round 3 | | | Round 4 | | | Round 5 | | | Round 6 | | | Round 7 | |
| Party | Candidate | Votes | % | Transfer | Votes | % | Transfer | Votes | % | Transfer | Votes | % | Transfer | Votes | % | Transfer | Votes | % | Transfer | Votes | % |
|---|---|---|---|---|---|---|---|---|---|---|---|---|---|---|---|---|---|---|---|---|---|
| Republican | Robert Charles | 49,129 | 38.0 | + 165 | 49,294 | 38.3 | + 486 | 49,780 | 39.9 | + 582 | 50,342 | 40.0 | + 574 | 50,916 | 41.2 | + 2,330 | 53,246 | 45.9 | + 6,627 | 59,873 | 60.3 |
| Republican | Ben Midgley | 25,880 | 20.0 | + 87 | 25,967 | 20.2 | + 583 | 26,650 | 20.9 | + 693 | 27,243 | 21.6 | + 1,293 | 28,536 | 23.1 | + 3,017 | 31,553 | 27.2 | + 7,946 | 39,499 | 39.7 |
| Republican | Jonathan Bush | 25,449 | 19.7 | + 254 | 25,703 | 20.0 | + 389 | 26,092 | 20.4 | + 682 | 26,744 | 21.2 | + 1,024 | 27,768 | 22.5 | + 3,336 | 31,104 | 26.8 | 31,104 | Eliminated | |
| Republican | Garrett Mason | 14,820 | 11.4 | + 185 | 15,005 | 11.7 | + 337 | 15,342 | 12.0 | + 419 | 15,761 | 12.5 | + 677 | 16,438 | 13.3 | 16,438 | Eliminated | | | | |
| Republican | Owen McCarthy | 5,033 | 3.9 | + 225 | 5,258 | 4.1 | + 270 | 5,528 | 4.3 | + 241 | 5,769 | 4.6 | 5,769 | Eliminated | | | | | | | |
| Republican | David Jones | 3,740 | 2.9 | + 134 | 3,874 | 3.0 | + 174 | 4,048 | 3.2 | 4,048 | Eliminated | | | | | | | | | | |
| Republican | Robert Wessels | 3,525 | 2.7 | + 112 | 3,637 | 2.8 | 3,637 | Eliminated | | | | | | | | | | | | | |
| Republican | James Libby (withdrawn) | 1,831 | 1.4 | 1,831 | Eliminated | | | | | | | | | | | | | | | | |
| Continuing ballots | | 129,407 | 100.0 | | 128,738 | 99.5 | | 127,740 | 98.4 | | 125,859 | 97.3 | | 123,658 | 95.6 | | 115,903 | 89.6 | | 99,372 | 76.8 |
| Exhausted ballots | | – | | + 669 | 669 | 0.5 | + 1,398 | 2,067 | 1.6 | + 1,471 | 3,538 | 2.7 | + 2,201 | 5,739 | 4.4 | + 7,775 | 13,541 | 10.4 | + 16,531 | 30,045 | 23.2 |
| Total votes | | 129,407 | 100.0 | | 129,407 | 100.0 | | 129,407 | 100.0 | | 129,407 | 100.0 | | 129,407 | 100.0 | | 129,407 | 100.0 | | 129,407 | 100.0 |

== Independents ==
=== Candidates ===
==== Declared ====
- Rick Bennett, state senator (1996–2004, 2020–present), Republican nominee for ME-2 in 1994 and candidate for U.S. Senate in 2012

==== Failed to qualify for ballot ====
- Ed Crockett, state representative (2018–present)
- John Glowa, retired environmental specialist
- Derek Levasseur, former police officer and Republican candidate for U.S. Senate in 2020
- Alexander Murchison, mechanical engineer

=== Fundraising ===
Italics indicate a disqualified candidate

Campaign finance reports as of May 28, 2026
| Candidate | Raised | Spent | Cash on hand |
|---|---|---|---|
| Richard Bennett (I) | $664,631.42 | $585,378.45 | $78,321.02 |
| Ed Crockett (I) | $9,116.98 | $3,982.91 | $4,589.61 |
| John Glowa (I) | $3,146.00 | $2,262.00 | $946.00 |
| Alexander Murchison (I) | $0.00 | $0.00 | $0.00 |
Source: Maine Ethics Commission

== General election ==
Pingree maintained a large polling and fundraising lead for the duration of the campaign, with just a single poll showing her with less than an eight-point lead. She also received the endorsements of several prominent Republicans and independents, including senator Angus King. In September, Charles came under fire from his sister Anita, who criticized his stance on abortion rights and his relationship with former U.S. House Speaker Dennis Hastert, who in 2016 was convicted for financial crimes related to his alleged abuse of teenage boys. Anita Charles said she would be supporting Pingree. In October, the Charles campaign was fined over $22,000 by the Maine Ethics Commission for campaign donation violations. Charles, whose campaign was considered bellicose in the Republican primary, opted for a more low-key campaign style during the general election, holding an open forum where anyone could ask him questions at the Auburn Mall on the eve of the election.

On election day, Pingree defeated Charles by 17 points, the largest margin of victory for a first-term gubernatorial candidate since Republican Frederick G. Payne defeated Democrat Louis Lausier by 31 points in 1948, and Pingree's 54.4% of the vote is the most a first-term gubernatorial candidate since Payne received 65.6% of the vote in that election. Pingree became the first governor to succeed a governor of the same party since Burton M. Cross, a Republican, who would be elected to succeed Payne in 1952. Pingree's margin of victory was the largest for any Maine governor since Angus King won the 1998 election by nearly 40 points. The 37.4% of the vote Charles received is the worst result for a Republican gubernatorial candidate since Chandler Woodcock received 30.2% in 2006. Bennett's 8.1% of the vote is the best showing for an independent candidate since Eliot Cutler received 8.4% of the vote in 2014.

Despite performing worse in the popular vote than 2022 nominee Paul LePage, Charles did manage to flip Franklin County. It had supported Democrat Janet Mills, who is a native of Franklin County, in 2018 and 2022. Pingree flipped Androscoggin County, which had last voted for a Democratic gubernatorial candidate in 2006 and had voted Republican in each subsequent election. It had last voted for a Democrat in any statewide election in 2012, when it voted for Barack Obama in that year's presidential election.

=== Predictions ===
| Source | Ranking | As of |
|---|---|---|
| The Cook Political Report | Solid D | October 29, 2026 |
| Decision Desk HQ | Likely D | November 3, 2026 |
| Fox News | Solid D | November 1, 2026 |
| Inside Elections | Solid D | October 29, 2026 |
| NBC News | Solid D | November 3, 2026 |
| RealClearPolitics | Likely D | November 1, 2026 |
| Sabato's Crystal Ball | Likely D | November 2, 2026 |
| Silver Bulletin | Solid D | November 3, 2026 |

=== Post-primary endorsements ===
Hannah Pingree (D)

U.S. senators

- Angus King, Maine (2013–present) and former governor of Maine (1995–2003) (Independent)

State legislators

- William Bridgeo, state representative from then 60th district (2022–present)
- Ed Crockett, state representative from the 43rd district (2018–2022) and 115th district (2022–present) and former gubernatorial candidate (Independent)
- Roger Katz, state senator from the 24th district (2010–2014) and 15th district (2014–2018) (Republican)
- William Pluecker, state representative from the 44th district (2018–present) (Independent)
- Chris Rector, state senator from the 22nd district (2008–2012) (Republican)

Tribal officials

- Kirk Francis, chief of the Penobscot Nation
- Sheila McCormack, chief of the Miꞌkmaq Nation
- William Nicholas Sr., chief of the Passamaquoddy Tribe at Motahkomikuk
- Clarissa Sabattis, chief of the Houlton Band of Maliseet Indians

Labor unions

- Maine Education Association
- United Auto Workers

Organizations

- EMILYs List
- End Citizens United
- Human Rights Campaign
- National Women's Political Caucus
- Planned Parenthood
Bobby Charles (R)

Statewide officials

- Chris Christie, former governor of New Jersey (2010–2018)
- Chris Sununu, former governor of New Hampshire (2017–2025)
Rick Bennett (I)

Executive branch officials

- Christine Todd Whitman, former administrator of the Environmental Protection Agency (2001–2003) and governor of New Jersey (1994–2001) (Forward; elected as a Republican)
- William Cohen, former secretary of defense (1997–2001) and United States senator (1979–1997) from Maine (Republican)

State legislators

- Lydia Crafts, state representative from the 90th district (2020–present) (Democratic)
- Mary E. Small, former state senator from the 19th district (1994–2002) (Republican)
- Matthew Pouliot, state senator from the 15th district (2018–present) (Republican)

Political parties

- Forward Party

=== Polling ===
Aggregate polls

| Source of poll aggregation | Dates administered | Dates updated | Hannah Pingree (D) | Bobby Charles (R) | Rick Bennett (I) | Other/Undecided (Note: Calculated by taking the difference of 100% and all other candidates combined.) | Margin |
|---|---|---|---|---|---|---|---|
| 270toWin | October 16 – November 1, 2026 | November 2, 2026 | 48.8% | 39.2% | 7.0% | 5.0% | Pingree +9.6% |
| Decision Desk HQ | through November 1, 2026 | November 2, 2026 | 50.5% | 39.8% | — | 9.7% | Pingree +10.7% |
| FiftyPlusOne | through November 1, 2026 | November 2, 2026 | 50.8% | 39.7% | 7.2% | 2.3% | Pingree +11.1% |
| RealClearPolitics | September 17 – October 26, 2026 | October 30, 2026 | 49.7% | 39.7% | — | 10.6% | Pingree +10.0% |
| Silver Bulletin | through November 1, 2026 | November 1, 2026 | 50.1% | 39.9% | — | 10.0% | Pingree +10.2% |
| Average | | | 50.0% | 39.7% | 7.1% | 3.2% | Pingree +10.3% |

| Poll source | Date(s) administered | Sample size | Margin of error | Hannah Pingree (D) | Bobby Charles (R) | Rick Bennett (I) | Other | Undecided |
|---|---|---|---|---|---|---|---|---|
| Emerson College (Note: Poll sponsored by Poll Vault, a Substack newsletter authored by Sean Trende.) | October 31 – November 1, 2026 | 600 (LV) | – | 50% | 41% | 9% | – | |
| AtlasIntel | October 28 – November 1, 2026 | 967 (LV) | ± 3.0% | 50% | 42% | 5% | 1% (Note: "Would not vote" with 1%; "Other" with <1%) | 2% |
| Survey 160 | October 27 – November 1, 2026 | 1,323 (LV) | ± 4.1% | 53% (Note: With voters who lean toward a given candidate) | 41% | 5% | — | 1% |
| Survey 160 | October 27 – November 1, 2026 | 1,323 (LV) | ± 4.1% | 53% | 41% | 4% | — | 2% |
| Survey 160 | October 27 – November 1, 2026 | 1,335 (RV) | ± 4.1% | 53% | 41% | 5% | — | 1% |
| Survey 160 | October 27 – November 1, 2026 | 1,335 (RV) | ± 4.1% | 53% | 41% | 4% | — | 2% |
| New York Times/Siena University | October 27 – November 1, 2026 | 714 (LV) | ± 4.7% | 49% | 37% | 8% | 0% | 6% |
| New York Times/Siena University | October 27 – November 1, 2026 | 714 (LV) | ± 4.7% | 55% | 40% | – | 0% (Note: "Another candidate" with <0.5%) | % |
| University of New Hampshire | October 27–31, 2026 | 1,654 (LV) | ± 2.4% | 51% | 40% | 7% | 1% (Note: "Another candidate" with 1%) | 1% |
| YouGov | October 26–29, 2026 | 1,503 (LV) | ± 4.0% | 53% | 45% | — | 2% (Note: "Someone else" with 2%) | 0% |
| Data for Progress (D) | October 23–27, 2026 | 652 (LV) | ± 4.5% | 49% | 37% | 7% | – | 6% |
| SSRS (Note: Poll conducted for CNN) | October 20–26, 2026 | 783 (LV) | ± 4.5% | 53% | 39% | — | 8% (Note: "Neither" with 4%) | 0% |
| Marist University | October 22–25, 2026 | — (LV) | ± 6.6% | 44% | 44% | 6% | 1% (Note: "Another party's candidate" with 1%) | 6% |
| Marist University | October 22–25, 2026 | 1,449 (RV) | ± 4.1% | 51% | 40% | 7% | <1% | 2% |
| Echelon Insights (R) (Note: Poll conducted for NetChoice) | October 16–23, 2026 | 413 (LV) | ± 6.3% | 51% | 38% | 7% | 1% (Note: "I did not vote for this office" with 1%) | 3% |
| Beacon Research (D)/Shaw & Co. Research (R) (Note: Poll conducted for Fox News) | October 16–20, 2026 | 1,514 (LV) | ± 2.5% | 49% | 39% | 9% | — | 2% |
| Beacon Research (D)/Shaw & Co. Research (R) | October 16–20, 2026 | 1,689 (RV) | ± 2% | 49% | 39% | 9% | — | 2% |
| Suffolk University | October 8–11, 2026 | 500 (LV) | ± 4.4% | 49% | 38% | 8% | — | 5% |
| The Washington Post/SSPG | September 30 – October 5, 2026 | 800 (LV) | ± 3.6% | 49% | 36% | 11% | — | 3% |
| Marist University | October 1–4, 2026 | 1,505 (RV) | ± 3.8% | 52% | 40% | 6% | — | 2% |
| CBS/YouGov | September 23 – October 1, 2026 | 1,133 (LV) | ± 4.7% | 56% | 44% | — | — | — |
| co/efficient (R) | September 28–30, 2026 | 1,240 (LV) | ± 2.77% | 47% | 38% | 6% | — | 9% |
| Fabrizio Ward (R)/ Impact Research (D) (Note: Poll commissioned by AARP) | September 20–22, 2026 | 982 (LV) | ± 3.1% | 52% | 39% | 6% | — | 3% |
| New York Times/Portland Press Herald/ Siena University | September 15–22, 2026 | 619 (LV) | ± 4.9% | 47% | 34% | 8% | — | 10% |
| New York Times/Portland Press Herald/ Siena University | September 15–22, 2026 | 619 (LV) | ± 4.9% | 53% | 39% | — | — | 7% |
| University of New Hampshire | September 17–21, 2026 | 1,312 (LV) | ± 2.7% | 48% | 40% | 5% | 2% (Note: "Another candidate" with 2%) | 5% |
| University of Massachusetts/YouGov | August 28 – September 14, 2026 | 650 (LV) | ± 4.7% | 49% | 38% | — | 1% (Note: "Another candidate" with 1%) | 10% |
| YouGov | September 2–8, 2026 | 1,335 (LV) | ± 4.9% | 47% | 36% | 2% | 1% (Note: "Someone else" with 1%) | 14% |
| YouGov | September 2–8, 2026 | 1,378 (RV) | ± 4.9% | 44% | 35% | 3% | 2% (Note: "Someone else" with 1%, "I will not vote in this race" with 1%) | 17% |
| SSRS (Note: Poll conducted for CNN) | August 31 – September 6, 2026 | 880 (LV) | ± 3.7% | 52% | 39% | — | 9% (Note: "Neither" with 5%) | — |
| Beacon Research (D)/ Shaw & Co. Research (R) (Note: Poll conducted for Fox News) | August 6–10, 2026 | 1,000 (RV) | ± 3.0% | 49% | 38% | 9% | — | 3% |
| University of New Hampshire | July 15–20, 2026 | 1,178 (LV) | ± 2.9% | 49% | 35% | 6% | 1% (Note: Another candidate with 1%) | 8% |
| Beacon Research (D)/ Shaw & Co. Research (R) | June 23–27, 2026 | 1,003 (RV) | ± 3.0% | 53% | 42% | — | — | 5% |
| New York Times/Portland Press Herald/ Siena University | June 19–26, 2026 | 608 (LV) | ± 4.8% | 50% | 36% | 8% | — | 5% |
| New York Times/Portland Press Herald/ Siena University | June 19–26, 2026 | 608 (LV) | ± 4.8% | 55% | 40% | — | — | 4% |

=== Results ===
2026 Maine gubernatorial election
| Party | Candidate | Votes | % | ±% |
|---|---|---|---|---|
| Democratic | Hannah Pingree | 388,721 | 55.69% | −1.25% |
| Republican | Robert B. Charles | 267,346 | 37.44% | −5.01% |
| Independent | Rick Bennett | 57,707 | 8.08% | N/A |
| Total votes | | 813,774 | 100.0% | N/A |
| Turnout | | | % | |
| Registered electors | | | | |
| Democratic hold | | | | |

==== By county ====
| | Hannah Pingree (Democratic) | | Robert B. Charles (Republican) | | Rick Bennett (Independent) | | Margin | | Total |
| County | Votes | % | Votes | % | Votes | % | Votes | % | Votes |
|---|---|---|---|---|---|---|---|---|---|
| Androscoggin | 23,474 | 46.3% | 22,520 | 44.4% | 4,676 | 9.2% | 954 | 0.9% | 50,670 |
| Aroostook | 9,972 | 37.1% | 14,844 | 55.3% | 2,020 | 5.7% | -4,772 | -18.2% | 26,836 |
| Cumberland | 119,569 | 68.0% | 42,185 | 24.0% | 14,015 | 7.9% | 77,384 | 44.0% | 175,769 |
| Franklin | 6,813 | 44.9% | 6,956 | 45.9% | 1,383 | 9.1% | -143 | -1.0% | 15,152 |
| Hancock | 17,838 | 56.4% | 11,789 | 37.3% | 1,957 | 6.2% | 6,049 | 19.1% | 31,584 |
| Kennebec | 30,229 | 48.3% | 27,169 | 43.4% | 5,169 | 8.2% | 3,060 | 4.9% | 62,567 |
| Knox | 13,956 | 62.0% | 7,233 | 32.1% | 1,309 | 5.8% | 6,723 | 29.9% | 22,498 |
| Lincoln | 12,175 | 55.9% | 7,911 | 36.3% | 1,681 | 7.7% | 4,264 | 19.6% | 21,767 |
| Oxford | 11,631 | 40.1% | 12,586 | 43.4% | 4,791 | 16.5% | -955 | -3.3% | 29,008 |
| Penobscot | 32,449 | 45.5% | 33,779 | 47.4% | 5,070 | 7.1% | -1,330 | -0.9% | 71,298 |
| Piscataquis | 2,809 | 34.5% | 4,779 | 58.8% | 542 | 6.6% | -1,970 | -24.3% | 8,130 |
| Sagadahoc | 12,991 | 58.4% | 7,422 | 33.4% | 1,814 | 8.1% | 5,569 | 25.0% | 22,227 |
| Somerset | 8,261 | 36.5% | 12,623 | 55.8% | 1,744 | 7.7% | -4,362 | -19.3% | 22,628 |
| Waldo | 11,865 | 53.3% | 9,062 | 40.7% | 1,309 | 5.8% | 2,803 | 12.6% | 22,236 |
| Washington | 5,425 | 39.8% | 7,404 | 54.4% | 777 | 5.7% | -1,979 | -14.6% | 13,606 |
| York | 65,027 | 57.5% | 38,711 | 34.2% | 9,242 | 8.2% | 26,316 | 23.2% | 112,980 |

Counties that flipped from Republican to Democratic

- Androscoggin (largest municipality: Lewiston)

Counties that flipped from Democratic to Republican

- Franklin (largest municipality: Farmington)

==== By congressional district ====
Pingree and Charles each won one congressional district.

| District | Pingree | Charles | Elected Representative |
|---|---|---|---|
| 1st | 62.38% | 29.78% | Chellie Pingree |
| 2nd | 45.27% | 46.28% | Paul LePage |

== See also ==
- 2026 United States elections
- 2026 Maine elections
- 2026 United States Senate election in Maine
- 2026 United States House of Representatives elections in Maine
