= Troy Jackson =

American politician and logger (born 1968)

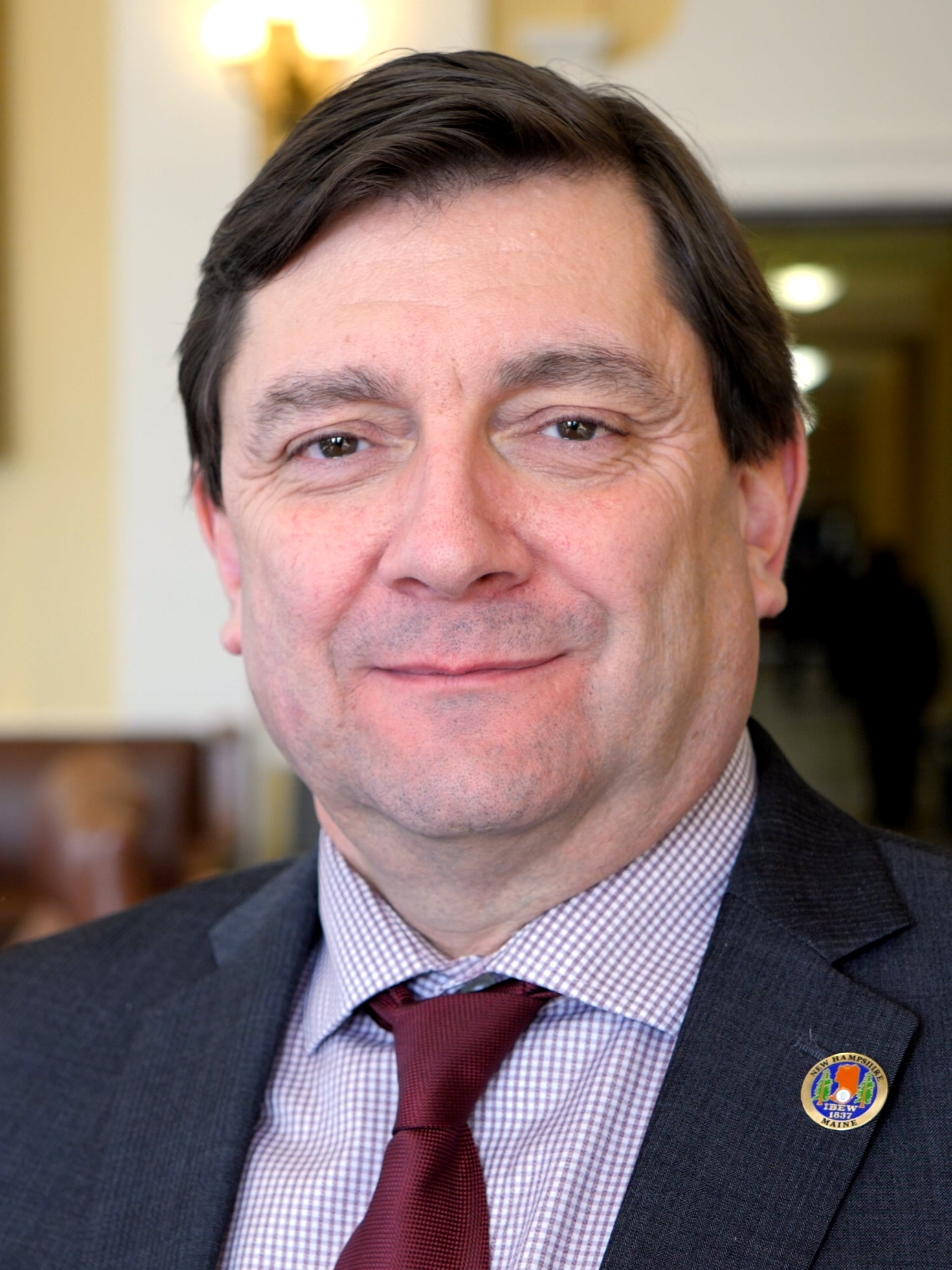
- Jackson in 2023

United States Senator-elect from Maine
- Assuming office January 3, 2027
- Succeeding: Susan Collins

Member of the Maine Senate
- In office December 7, 2016 – December 4, 2024
- Preceded by: Peter Edgecomb
- Succeeded by: Susan Y. Bernard
- Constituency: 1st district
- In office December 3, 2008 – December 3, 2014
- Preceded by: John L. Martin
- Succeeded by: Dawn Hill
- Constituency: 35th district
Maine Senate positions
President of the Maine Senate
In office December 5, 2018 – December 4, 2024
Preceded by	Michael Thibodeau
Succeeded by	Mattie Daughtry
Minority Leader of the Maine Senate
In office December 7, 2016 – December 5, 2018
Preceded by	Justin Alfond
Succeeded by	Dana Dow
Majority Leader of the Maine Senate
In office July 10, 2013 – December 3, 2014
Preceded by	Seth Goodall
Succeeded by	Garrett Mason

Member of the Maine House of Representatives
- In office December 4, 2002 – December 3, 2008
- Preceded by: Marc Michaud
- Succeeded by: John L. Martin
- Constituency: 151st district (2002–2004); 1st district (2004–2008)

Personal details
- Born: Troy Dale Jackson; June 26, 1968 (age 58) Fort Kent, Maine, U.S.
- Party: Republican (before 2002); Independent (2002–2004); Democratic (2004–present)
- Domestic partner: Lana Pelletier
- Children: 2
- Education: University of Maine, Fort Kent (AA)
- Website: Campaign website

Troy Dale Jackson (born June 26, 1968) is an American politician and former logger who is a United States senator-elect from Maine. A member of the Democratic Party, he served in the Maine Senate from 2008 to 2014 and from 2016 to 2024, representing parts of northern Aroostook County. He was the Senate president from 2018 to 2024.

Jackson grew up in Allagash, Maine, and worked as a logger before entering politics. He first served in the Maine House of Representatives from 2002 to 2008, initially as an independent before joining the Democratic Party. He became involved in politics after helping lead a 1998 blockade by Maine loggers protesting the employment of Canadian workers in the state's logging industry. In the Maine Senate, he served as majority leader from 2013 to 2014 and as minority leader from 2016 to 2018.

As the Senate president, Jackson pursued a populist agenda focused on labor rights, health care, and economic issues. His legislative accomplishments included expanding access to prescription drugs, establishing universal free school meals, and increasing child care assistance. After an unsuccessful gubernatorial campaign in 2026, he became the Democratic nominee for the U.S. Senate at a Democratic nominating convention after former nominee Graham Platner withdrew. Jackson defeated incumbent Republican Susan Collins in the general election, becoming the first Democrat to represent Maine in the Senate since George J. Mitchell in 1995. (Note: Independent Angus King caucuses with the Senate Democratic Caucus.)

== Early life and education ==
Jackson (back second left) with high school classmates in Allagash, 1986

Jackson was born on June 26, 1968, in Fort Kent, Maine, on the state's border with Canada. His mother, Colleen McBreairty, was a teacher, and his father, Joe Jackson, was a logger. His parents married when they were young and he was born when his mother was 16. He grew up in Allagash in a Catholic family and his parents divorced while he was in middle school. He attended Allagash Consolidated School, where he played the sports the small school offered. In 2000, he earned an Associate of Arts degree in business from the University of Maine at Fort Kent.

== Logging career ==
Jackson grew up around the logging industry and rode in his father's logging truck as a child. When he was 12, he witnessed his father and other northern Maine loggers strike over concerns about mechanized harvesting and wages, an experience that shaped his views on labor. At age 19, he began working as a logger despite his parents' wanting him to pursue a different career. Jackson became the fifth generation in his family to work as a logger.

In 1998, while working as a logger, Jackson helped lead a one-week blockade along the Maine–Canada border, with loggers from Maine using their trucks to block Canadian loggers from crossing the border at three border checkpoints. Fourteen other loggers joined him in the blockade. Before the blockade, the group had filed 137 complaints with the U.S. Department of Labor over the hiring of temporary Canadian workers, but all the complaints were denied.

Industrial timber owners and corporate forest groups strongly condemned the blockade of an international crossing and argued that the use of direct action set a dangerous precedent for trade and cross-border transit. Forest industry groups said the blockade threatened Maine's forest-products sector because it disrupted supplies to regional mills and risked damaging longstanding trade ties with Canada. Opponents also argued that hiring temporary Canadian workers through the federal seasonal H-2A visa program was legal and necessary because Maine's wood industry did not have enough local workers.

The blockade ended unsuccessfully after a week. Jackson and two other loggers were escorted away by the police. The incident prompted Jackson to enter electoral politics.

== Maine House of Representatives ==
Jackson first ran for office as a Republican, running for the Maine House of Representatives in 2000 for District 151. He narrowly lost to Democratic nominee Marc Michaud, with 2,017 votes to Michaud's 2,172.

In 2002, Jackson was elected as an independent to House District 151, defeating Michaud, 2,171 votes to 1,176 in a race without a Republican candidate. He was the first non-Democrat to represent the area since 1978. The Bangor Daily News called Jackson's victory the biggest upset of the 2002 elections in Maine.

In 2004, during his first term, Jackson joined the Democratic Party, citing Democratic support for legislation he had sponsored that would allow independent logging contractors to collectively bargain with forest landowners. The bill was signed into law by Governor John Baldacci later that year. After Maine's post-census legislative redistricting, Jackson ran for reelection in 2004 in the new House District 1 as a Democrat. He defeated Republican Paul Berube by a vote of 3,486 to 1,248.

During his second term, Jackson, a father of two children, sponsored legislation in 2005 that required alcohol distributors to post signs stating the legal consequences of buying alcohol for minors. The measure grew out of efforts by a community group from his district in the St. John Valley to combat underage drinking, including placing similar signs in the area, and became law that year. He was reelected to the State House unopposed in 2006.

In the Maine House, Jackson served on the Labor Committee and the Fisheries and Wildlife Committee. He chaired the Fisheries and Wildlife Committee for two terms.

== Maine Senate ==
=== Maine Senate (2008–2014) ===
Maine state senate 2010 election results. District 35 is the northernmost district.

In 2008, Jackson was elected to represent District 35 in the Maine State Senate, defeating Republican Daniel DeVeau, 11,188 votes to 6,593. He was reelected in 2010, again defeating DeVeau, 7,525 votes to 5,620, and holding the seat despite a Republican wave that saw the GOP claim its first government trifecta in Maine since 1963. In 2012, Jackson was elected to a third term with 8,521 votes to Republican nominee Peter Edgecomb's 8,016.

In 2010, Jackson introduced a bill that would have prohibited the Maine Department of Conservation from hiring foreign laborers at state-owned logging sites. It passed both the House of Representatives and the State Senate before being vetoed by Republican Governor Paul LePage in 2011. LePage questioned the bill's constitutionality, while Jackson said that LePage was favoring large Canadian logging corporations over American workers.

Democrats regained control of the Maine Senate in the 2012 elections, and in December of that year, Jackson was elected assistant majority leader of the state senate. On July 10, 2013, Jackson was elected majority leader of the Maine Senate after the departure of fellow Democrat Seth Goodall, who resigned to accept a presidential appointment overseeing the New England region of the Small Business Administration.

In June 2013, Jackson called Governor LePage an "obstructionist" and "delusional" during discussions about the 2013–14 state budget. LePage responded that Jackson "claims to be for the people but he's the first one to give it to the people without providing Vaseline". LePage added that Jackson "is a bad person" with "no brains" and a "black heart".

During his first period in the Maine Senate, Jackson served on a number of committees, including the Labor Committee, the Agriculture, Conservation and Forestry Committee, and the State and Government Committee. He chaired the Labor and Agriculture, Conservation, and Forestry Committees.

=== Congressional run and the DNC (2014–2016) ===
On July 1, 2013, after incumbent Democratic Congressman Mike Michaud's decision to explore running for governor, Jackson announced he would run for Maine's 2nd congressional district. On June 10, 2014, Jackson lost the Democratic primary to fellow State Senator Emily Cain, with 21% of the vote to Cain's 79%. Cain lost the general election to Republican Bruce Poliquin.

On January 25, 2015, Jackson was elected as a member of the Democratic National Committee. This gave him a superdelegate vote at the 2016 Democratic National Convention. He was one of only a handful of superdelegates to endorse and vote for Vermont Senator Bernie Sanders over former Secretary of State Hillary Clinton.

=== Return to the Maine Senate (2016–2024) ===
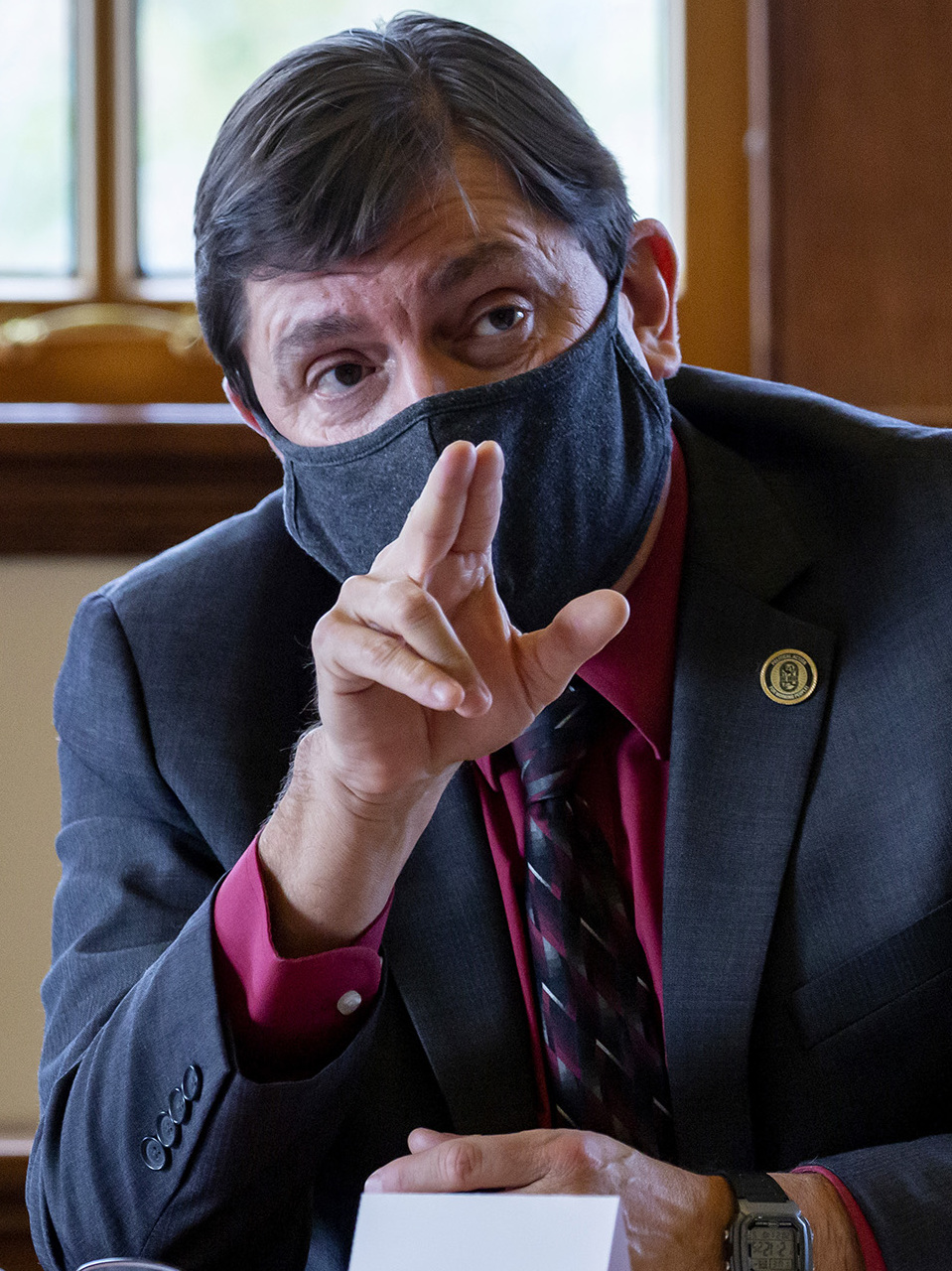
Jackson during the COVID-19 pandemic, 2021

In November 2016, Jackson was reelected to the Maine Senate, in what was now the 1st District, over Republican Timothy Guerrette, with 51.5% of the vote to Guerrette's 48.5%, gaining a seat for the Democrats. A week later, he was chosen by his fellow Democrats to be the senate minority leader. He was reelected in 2018, 2020, and 2022, becoming the senate president as the Democrats gained the majority in 2018 and retained it in 2020 and 2022.

As senate president, Jackson pursued a populist agenda that included fair wages and accessible health care. He sponsored legislation aimed at lowering prescription drug costs. One bill required brand-name drug manufacturers to make their drugs available to generic manufacturers, and became law in 2018 without Governor LePage's signature. In 2019, Jackson sponsored legislation that established a prescription drug affordability board and allowed the importation of prescription drugs, both of which were signed into law by Democratic Governor Janet Mills.

Jackson later introduced a legislation plan to address child care shortages and expand access to free school meals. The plan included legislation sponsored by Jackson, which established universal free school meals, regardless of family income, beginning in the 2022–23 school year. The legislation made Maine the second state in the country to offer such a program. In 2023, Jackson sponsored legislation to expand Maine's child care system that expanded subsidy eligibility to families earning up to 125 percent of the state's median income and doubled the average monthly stipend for child care workers. The expanded eligibility provision took effect the next year.

Jackson's legislative record during his senate presidency also included other health care measures. In 2022, he sponsored legislation that required state-regulated health plans to cover prescription contraceptives without out-of-pocket costs, which became law that year. In 2024, he introduced legislation to regulate medical credit cards used to pay medical bills and protect patients from high interest charges.

Ahead of the 2022 Maine gubernatorial election, Jackson's supporters, including several labor unions and former Portland mayor Ethan Strimling, formed a political action committee named "Run Troy Run" in an attempt to draft Jackson to challenge incumbent governor Janet Mills in the Democratic primary. Jackson distanced himself from the group's efforts, said he would not run against Mills, and endorsed her reelection campaign. In 2023, he ran for a local seat on the Board of Selectmen in Allagash. He lost the election by six votes.

During his second period in the Maine Senate, Jackson served on the Senate Rules Committee and the Joint Select Committee on Joint Rules, which he chaired during his final term. He left the Maine Senate following the 2024 election due to term limits.

== 2026 gubernatorial campaign ==
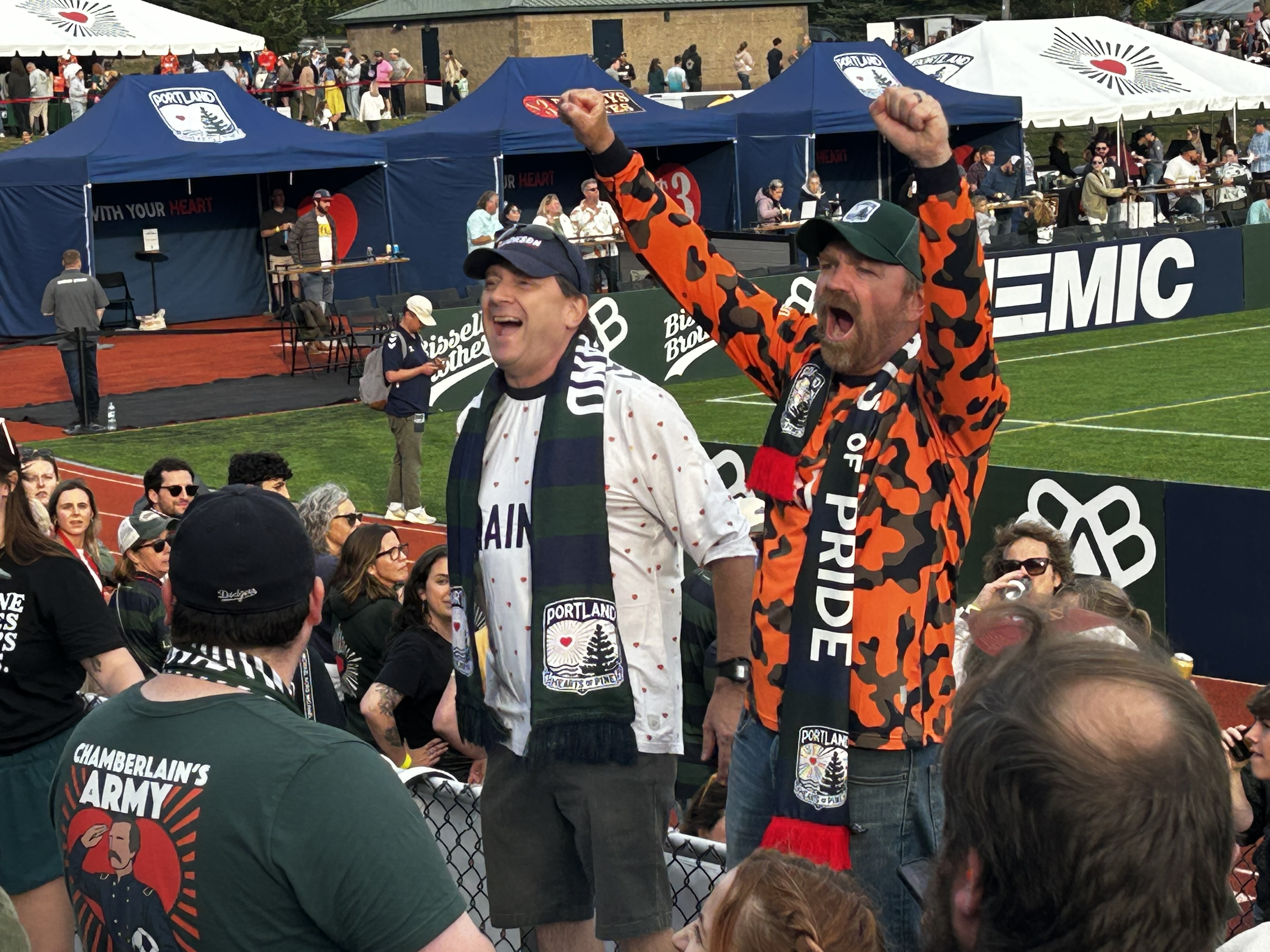
Jackson campaigning alongside Graham Platner at a Portland Hearts of Pine match in September 2025

On March 7, 2025, Jackson announced he was exploring a run for governor of Maine in the 2026 election. On May 19, he announced his candidacy at the Portsmouth Naval Shipyard in Kittery. He said he was running on behalf of working-class Mainers who feel "under attack from billionaires, special interests, and their friends who control Washington".

Jackson was endorsed by 40 local Maine labor unions, as well as high-profile national progressives such as U.S. Senator Bernie Sanders and U.S. Representative from California Ro Khanna. In March 2026, he was endorsed by the Mi'kmaq Tribal Council, which cited Jackson's longtime support for tribal sovereignty and his establishing a commission to examine the 1980 Maine Indian Claims Settlement Act.

In the ranked-choice Democratic primary, Jackson finished third on first preferences and was eliminated on the third count with 29% of the vote. The primary was won by Hannah Pingree, whom Jackson had cross-endorsed along with fellow candidate Shenna Bellows.

== U.S. Senate ==
=== Campaign ===
Jackson's 2026 campaign logo, used for both his campaign for governor and Senate

During their respective primary campaigns, gubernatorial candidate Jackson initially maintained a close political alliance with U.S. Senate candidate Graham Platner. They endorsed each other and often appeared at rallies together. On June 9, 2026, Platner won his primary, while Jackson lost his. Less than a month later, a former partner of Platner's accused him of sexually assaulting her in 2021. Jackson immediately distanced himself from Platner, rescinded his endorsement, and called on Platner to withdraw from the race. Jackson said it would be "incredibly self-serving" if Platner did not end his Senate campaign but praised Platner for building a movement that "lasted past him".

On July 7, 2026, Jackson filed Federal Election Commission paperwork forming a campaign committee to run for the U.S. Senate as Platner's replacement. He formally announced his candidacy to replace Platner the next day. He was endorsed by U.S. Representative Ro Khanna, U.S. Senator Bernie Sanders, and the Maine Democratic Socialists of America (DSA). Jackson said he would not accept an endorsement from Platner and that Platner had lied to him when he had asked about Platner's past behavior.

During county caucuses held on July 18 and 19 to elect delegates to a special nominating convention scheduled for July 25, Jackson's slate won an absolute majority in every county except Lincoln and Washington, and 456 (Note: The Jackson campaign claims 481 out of 500 elected delegates. This article uses numbers sourced by the Bangor Daily News.) out of 500 total elected delegates statewide. His major opponents, Secretary of State Shenna Bellows, former CDC official Nirav Shah, businessman Dan Kleban, and former congressional staffer Jordan Wood, withdrew on July 19, with the latter three endorsing Jackson.

At the special Democratic convention on July 25, Jackson won the Democratic nomination over healthcare executive Saundra Pelletier, 566–5.

On November 3, Jackson defeated Collins, 53% to 47%. He was one of nine Democrats to flip Republican-held Senate seats in 2026.

== Political positions ==
=== Abortion rights ===
Early in his legislative career, Jackson held socially conservative positions on abortion rights. In both 2003 and 2010, Maine Right to Life, which opposes abortion rights, gave him perfect scores on his voting record. In 2011, he was the only Democrat in the Maine State Senate to vote for a bill that would have given legal standing to a fetus in the event of an attack on a pregnant woman. In 2012, Jackson identified as anti-abortion, and said that abortion should be illegal in all cases except for rape or incest.

He attributed his pro-life stance to his Roman Catholic upbringing, and later said "I've made mistakes early on in understanding" the issue of abortion and changed his stance on the issue. In 2017, he voted against a fetal personhood bill like the 2011 bill he supported. In 2019, he voted for a bill that guarantees that MaineCare and private insurance provide coverage of abortion care if a plan offers prenatal care. In 2023, Jackson helped pass a law that allows abortion at any stage of pregnancy if a doctor deems it medically necessary.

Despite saying he was still not comfortable with abortion, Jackson condemned the U.S. Supreme Court's 2022 opinion that overturned Roe v. Wade. In his 2026 Senate campaign, Jackson ran on federally codifying the right to abortion, and was endorsed by Planned Parenthood.

=== Daylight saving time ===
Jackson has said that he would preserve daylight saving time, rather than support permanent time observation.

=== Environment ===
Jackson supports expanding conservation of public lands, while maintaining public access.

In the Maine Senate, he proposed a bill to ban aerial spraying of the herbicide glyphosate in forests. The bill passed the legislature but was vetoed by Governor Janet Mills, who said she supported taking certain steps but did not support the proposed "blanket prohibition".

=== Foreign policy ===
Jackson opposes the 2026 Iran war. He supports aid to Ukraine.

Jackson is critical of Israel. In July 2026, he said, "anybody with eyes and a heart knows the Israeli government is committing genocide in Gaza." He said he would never vote for U.S. military aid to Israel.

=== Gambling ===
As Maine Senate President, Jackson pushed strongly to expand tribal gambling rights. He sponsored legislation that granted Maine's Wabanaki nations exclusive rights to operate mobile and online apps for sports betting.

=== Guns ===
Early in his political career, Jackson had a legislative history of opposing firearms restrictions and had high ratings from the National Rifle Association.

After the 2023 mass shootings in Lewiston, Jackson shifted his approach toward gun laws in Maine. In the 2024 Maine legislative session, he led several gun safety bills through the legislature, including a 72-hour waiting period for firearm purchases and a ban on bump stocks. In 2025, he wrote an op-ed supporting a "yes" vote on Maine Question 2, which implemented a red flag law in the state.

=== Healthcare ===
Jackson supports the Medicare for All Act, which would establish a single-payer national health care system run by the Department of Health and Human Services. He also supports lower prescription drug prices. In the past, he has supported generic prescription medications, pharmaceutical equivalents to brand-name products whose patents have expired.

Jackson has advocated a legally binding moratorium to prevent private equity firms from purchasing independent healthcare practices in Maine.

=== Immigration ===
Jackson has called for the abolition of ICE, and said in a July 2026 debate, "I'd abolish it [ICE] altogether." He said ICE is a "rogue agency" that "gives us nothing in this country but heartache and racism".

=== LGBTQ rights ===
Early in his legislative career, Jackson held socially conservative positions on LGBTQ rights. In May 2009, he was one of only two state Senate Democrats to vote against a bill to legalize same-sex marriage in Maine.

By 2019, his position had shifted, and he voted in favor of a ban on conversion therapy. In 2024, the LGBTQ rights advocacy group Equality Maine gave him a 100% rating. In his 2026 Senate campaign, Jackson ran on strengthening anti-discrimination laws to protect LGBTQ citizens.

=== Real estate ===
Jackson proposes banning purchases by non-Maine private equity firms and multi-state real estate conglomerates of single-family residential starter homes.

Jackson endorses an increased lodging tax on out-of-state visitors. He also proposes a dedicated luxury tax surcharge on vacation homes valued at over $1 million.

=== Relationship with Bernie Sanders ===
During the 2016 presidential election, Jackson was a prominent supporter of Bernie Sanders's campaign, and cast his superdelegate vote for him at the Democratic National Convention. On July 6, 2015, he introduced Sanders at a campaign rally before 8,000 supporters in Portland, Maine. During the 2020 presidential election, Jackson again supported Sanders, and again addressed a Portland rally for him on September 1, 2019. After the primaries, Jackson supported the Democratic ticket of former Vice President Joe Biden and Senator Kamala Harris. On May 21, 2025, Sanders endorsed Jackson's 2026 gubernatorial campaign, and on Labor Day he headlined a Portland campaign rally for Jackson and Platner, attended by 6,500 supporters. Sanders held three rallies in October 2026 in support of Jackson's campaign for U.S. Senate, in Bangor, Lewiston, and Biddeford.

== Personal life ==
Jackson lives in Allagash, Maine, with his longtime partner, Lana Pelletier, and their two sons. Pelletier, a social worker, is also Jackson's second cousin. He has one grandchild.

== Electoral history ==
Year	Office	Election	Democratic	Votes	%	Republican	Votes	%	Independent	Votes	%
2000	Maine House of Representatives, 151st district	General	Marc Michaud	2,172	51.9%	Troy Jackson	2,017	48.1%			
2002	Maine House of Representatives, 151st district	General	Marc Michaud	1,176	35.1%				Troy Jackson	2,171	64.9%
2004	Maine House of Representatives, 1st district	General	Troy Jackson	3,486	73.6%	Paul Berube	1,248	26.4%			
2006	Maine House of Representatives, 1st district	General	Troy Jackson	2,826	100.0%						
2008	Maine Senate, 35th district	General	Troy Jackson	11,188	62.9%	Daniel DeVeau	6,593	37.1%			
2010	Maine Senate, 35th district	General	Troy Jackson	7,525	55.0%	Daniel DeVeau	5,620	41.0%			
2012	Maine Senate, 35th district	General	Troy Jackson	8,521	49.0%	Peter Edgecomb	8,016	46.0%			
2016	Maine Senate, 1st district	General	Troy Jackson	9,589	50.3%	Timothy Guerrette	9,018	47.3%			
2018	Maine Senate, 1st district	General	Troy Jackson	8,793	59.3%	Michael Nadeau	5,683	39.3%			
2020	Maine Senate, 1st district	General	Troy Jackson	10,937	57.6%	Brian Schaefer	7,485	39.4%			
2022	Maine Senate, 1st district	General	Troy Jackson	8,817	51.9%	Susan Y. Bernard	7,974	47.0%			

2014 Democratic primary for U.S. House District 2 results
Party	Candidate	Votes	%
Democratic	Emily Cain	19,906	71.0
Democratic	Troy Dale Jackson	8,116	29.0
Total votes		28,022	100.0

2023 Allagash first selectman election (Note: In the initial March 24 count, Jackson trailed Kelly 70 votes to 78. A recount Jackson requested, held April 11, produced a corrected tally of Kelly 77, Jackson 71.)
Candidate	Votes	%
Karie Kelly	77	51.7%
Troy Jackson	71	47.7%
Write-ins	1	0.7%
Total: 149

2026 Maine Democratic gubernatorial primary results
Party	Candidate	Round 1			Round 2			Round 3			Round 4	
Party	Candidate	Votes	%	Transfer	Votes	%	Transfer	Votes	%	Transfer	Votes	%
Democratic	Hannah Pingree	50,552	23.3	+4,808	55,360	26.0	+ 20,311	75,671	36.3	+ 36,079	111,750	56.2
Democratic	Nirav Shah	58,606	26.8	+ 4,255	62,860	29.5	+9,821	72,681	34.8	+ 14,269	86,950	43.8
Democratic	Troy Jackson	45,959	21.1	+ 1,638	47,597	22.3	+ 12,413	60,010	28.8	60,010	Eliminated	
Democratic	Shenna Bellows	44,770	20.6	+ 2,279	47,049	22.1	47,049	Eliminated				
Democratic	Angus King III	17,860	8.3	17,860	Eliminated							
Continuing ballots		217,747	100.0		212,848	97.8		208,542	95.8		198,700	91.1
Exhausted ballots		–		+ 4,881	4,881	2.2	+ 4,504	9,385	4.3	+ 9,662	19,047	8.9
Total votes		217,747	100.0		217,747	100.0		217,747	100.0		217,747	100.0

2026 United States Senate election in Maine
Party	Candidate	Votes	%	±%
Democratic	Troy Jackson	376,955	53.07	+10.68
Republican	Susan Collins (incumbent)	332,918	46.87	−4.11
Write-in		488	0.01	–0.02
Total votes		710,361	100.0	
Democratic gain from Republican				

== See also ==
- List of party switchers; Republican to Independent to Democrat
- List of presidents of the Maine Senate

== Notes ==
Maine Senate
Preceded by Seth Goodall	Majority Leader of the Maine Senate; 2013–2014	Succeeded by Garrett Mason
Preceded by Justin Alfond	Minority Leader of the Maine Senate; 2016–2018	Succeeded by Dana Dow
Political offices
Preceded by Michael Thibodeau	President of the Maine Senate; 2018–2024	Succeeded by Mattie Daughtry
Party political offices
Preceded by Graham Platner; Withdrew	Democratic nominee for U.S. Senator from Maine (Class 2); 2026	Most recent
U.S. Senate
Preceded by Susan Collins	U.S. Senator (Class 2) from Maine; Taking office 2027; Served alongside: Angus King	Elect
