= Angus King III =

American businessman (born 1970 or 1971)

- Born: Angus Stanley King III; 1970/1971 (age 55–56); Skowhegan, Maine, U.S.
- Education: Dartmouth College (BA); Harvard University (MBA)
- Political party: Democratic
- Spouse: Catherine Alexandre (m. 1999)
- Children: 2
- Relatives: Angus King (father)

Angus Stanley King III (born 1970 or 1971) is an American businessman and political candidate. He founded the energy company Peaks Renewables, where he was president until 2025. In May 2025, he announced he would run as a Democrat in the 2026 Maine gubernatorial election. He finished last in the Democratic primary. He is the son of US Senator and former Maine governor Angus King.

== Early life and education ==
Angus S. King III was born in Skowhegan, Maine in 1970 or 1971. His father, Angus King Jr., has served as a US Senator from Maine since 2013 and was the state's governor for two terms from 1995 to 2003. His mother is deacon and writer Edie Hazard Birney. His stepmother is Mary Herman, who is married to Senator King.

King showed early interest in politics, volunteering for Michael Dukakis' 1988 presidential campaign when he was 18 years old. He attended Dartmouth College, his father's alma mater, during which time he campaigned for Bill Clinton and Al Gore. King graduated cum laude from Dartmouth in 1993. King later pursued graduate education, earning an MBA with distinction from Harvard Business School in 2001.

== Career ==
From 1995 to 1997, King worked as an assistant to the director of communications and assistant to the chief of staff at the White House under Bill Clinton. He later worked at the Bain & Company management consultancy.

In 2002, King moved back to Maine, where he worked in the renewable energy sector. He worked at wind energy company First Wind. He also worked on affordable housing as a project developer and partner at Wishcamper Group.

King founded renewable energy company Peaks Renewables, a subsidiary of Summit Utilities which has worked on a project in Clinton, Maine to produce renewable natural gas from cow manure. King left Peaks Renewables in 2025.

== Political career ==
In May 2025, King announced he would run a Democrat in the 2026 Maine gubernatorial election King had not previously held elected office. King's platform included lowering costs for families, building more housing, and creating jobs among Maine small businesses. In campaign messaging, he emphasized both his role as a political outsider and his legacy as the son of Senator Angus King. He has described himself as a "moderate".

A June 2025 poll by Pan Atlantic Research showed King with 33% support among likely Democratic gubernatorial primary voters, ahead of the other prospective Democratic candidates included in the poll—Secretary of State Shenna Bellows, former Maine House Speaker Hannah Pingree, and former Maine Senator Troy Jackson. In three succeeding polls, King saw his support drop to 5%.

King ultimately finished last in the Democratic primary, winning 8% of the first-preference votes in Maine's ranked-choice voting system. The primary was won by Pingree after King, Bellows, and Jackson had been eliminated.

== Personal life ==
King lives in Portland, Maine. He married interior designer Catherine Alexandre in 1999. They have two children.

== Electoral history ==
2026 Maine Democratic gubernatorial primary results
Party	Candidate	Round 1			Round 2			Round 3			Round 4	
Party	Candidate	Votes	%	Transfer	Votes	%	Transfer	Votes	%	Transfer	Votes	%
Democratic	Hannah Pingree	50,552	23.3	+4,808	55,360	26.0	+ 20,311	75,671	36.3	+ 36,079	111,750	56.2
Democratic	Nirav Shah	58,606	26.8	+ 4,255	62,860	29.5	+9,821	72,681	34.8	+ 14,269	86,950	43.8
Democratic	Troy Jackson	45,959	21.1	+ 1,638	47,597	22.3	+ 12,413	60,010	28.8	60,010	Eliminated	
Democratic	Shenna Bellows	44,770	20.6	+ 2,279	47,049	22.1	47,049	Eliminated				
Democratic	Angus King III	17,860	8.3	17,860	Eliminated							
Continuing ballots		217,747	100.0		212,848	97.8		208,542	100.0		198,700	91.1
Exhausted ballots		–		+ 4,881	4,881	2.2	+ 4,504	9,385	4.3	+ 9,662	19,047	8.9
Total votes		217,747	100.0		217,747	100.0		217,747	100.0		217,747	100.0
