= Robert B. Charles =

American lawyer and politician (born 1960)

Bobby Charles
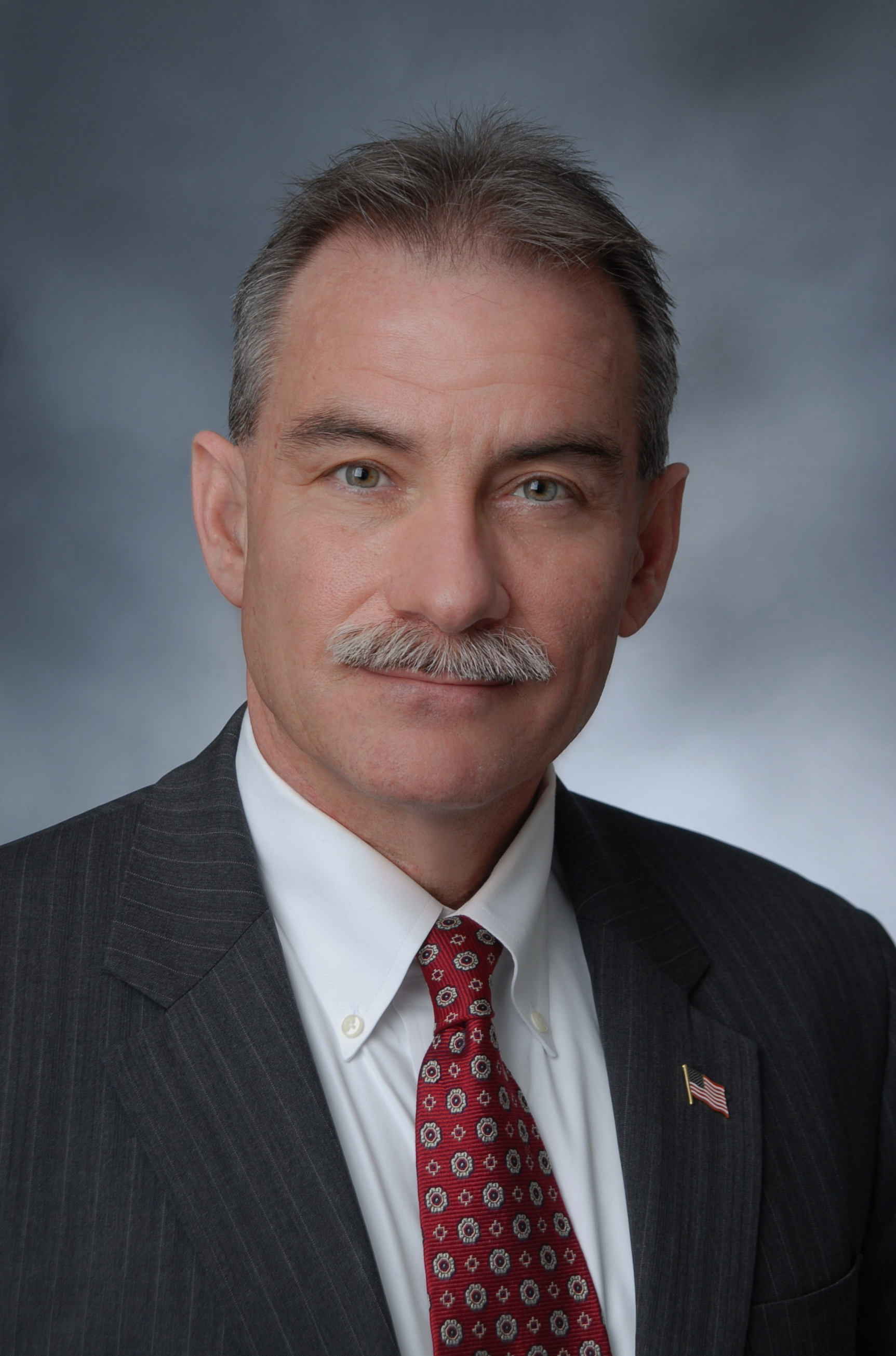
- Charles in 2017

8th Assistant Secretary of State for International Narcotics and Law Enforcement Affairs
- In office October 6, 2003 – March 15, 2005
- President: George W. Bush
- Preceded by: Rand Beers
- Succeeded by: Anne W. Patterson

Personal details
- Born: Robert Bruce Charles; August 23, 1960 (age 66) Virginia, U.S.
- Party: Republican
- Spouse: Marina Timasheff (m. 1988)
- Children: 1
- Education: Dartmouth College (AB); New College, Oxford (MA); Columbia University (JD)
- Website: Official website Campaign website

Robert Bruce Charles (born August 23, 1960) is an American lawyer. He served as the Assistant Secretary of State for International Narcotics and Law Enforcement Affairs from 2003 to 2005. He was the Republican Party nominee for governor of Maine in the 2026 election, where he supported increased presence of United States Immigration and Customs Enforcement (ICE) in Maine. He was defeated by Democrat Hannah Pingree.

Charles founded The Charles Group, a consulting firm based in Washington, D.C.

== Early life and education ==
Charles grew up in a small town of Wayne, Maine, where his mother, Doris Anne, was a teacher. He married Marina Timasheff in 1988.

He received a Juris Doctor from Columbia Law School in 1987, a Master of Arts in philosophy, politics, and economics (PPE) on a Keasbey Scholarship from New College, Oxford in 1984, and a Bachelor of Arts from Dartmouth College in 1982.

== State Department career ==
From October 6, 2003 until March 15, 2005, Charles worked for International Narcotics and Law Enforcement Affairs (INL). One of the INL's missions during this time was to conduct counter-narcotics and build police forces in Afghanistan and Iraq. More than a dozen federal audits conducted over this period found a "failure to accomplish primary foreign policy goals", and criticized the operation's leaders for failing to effectively countering narcotics, despite receiving $1.2 billion in funding. Charles has said he resigned the State Department in 2005, though a Bangor Daily News investigation published days before the 2026 gubernatorial election revealed he was actually dismissed by Secretary of State Condoleezza Rice for insubordination. Charles disputes Rice's characterization of his departure from the State Department, and claims he resigned due to policy differences with Rice.

== 2026 gubernatorial campaign ==
In early April 2025, Charles announced his run in the 2026 Maine gubernatorial election. On June 9, he won the Republican nomination by a wide margin. He faced Democratic nominee Hannah Pingree and Independent Rick Bennett in the November general election.

Charles was active on social media during the campaign, having uploaded numerous videos about himself conversing with local residents in Maine. He also frequently uses generative AI on social media.

In September 2026, Charles's sister Anita announced that she would not be supporting her brother in an op-ed in the Portland Press Herald. Anita criticized her brother for his conduct during the campaign, for his views on abortion, and for maintaining a friendship with the late Dennis Hastert, the former Speaker of the United States House of Representatives, after allegations of sexual misconduct came to light in 2015.

In October 2026, the Charles campaign was fined over $22,000 by the Maine Ethics Commission for campaign donation violations.'

On election day, Charles was defeated by Pingree.

== Political positions ==
=== Immigration ===
Charles is a supporter of enforcing immigration law via Immigration and Customs Enforcement (ICE) presence in Maine. In August 2026, a statement from his campaign stated “everybody who is legally entitled to vote should be free from any intimidation and should be able to vote", and that "anybody who is not legally entitled to vote should not be voting.” He has also floated the idea of asking Tom Homan to have ICE and other law enforcement present at polling places.

Party political offices
Preceded by Paul LePage	Republican nominee for Governor of Maine; 2026	Most recent
