= Hannah Pingree =

Governor-elect of Maine (born 1976)

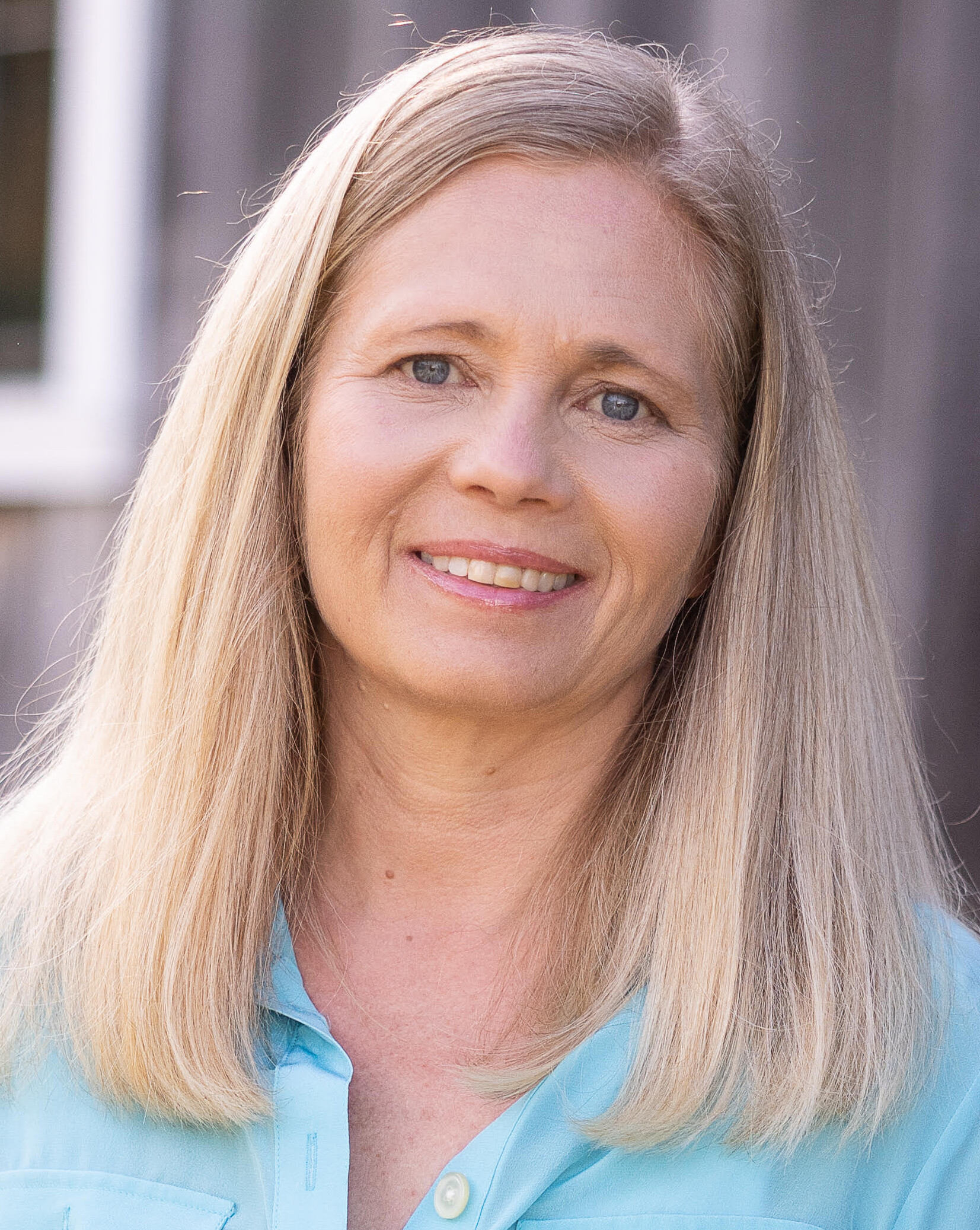
- Pingree in 2026

Governor-elect of Maine
- Assuming office January 6, 2027
- Succeeding: Janet Mills

Director of the Maine Office of Policy Innovation and the Future
- In office January 17, 2019 – May 16, 2025
- Governor: Janet Mills
- Preceded by: Position established
- Succeeded by: Sarah Curran

99th Speaker of the Maine House of Representatives
- In office December 3, 2008 – December 6, 2010
- Preceded by: Glenn Cummings
- Succeeded by: Robert Nutting

Majority Leader of the Maine House of Representatives
- In office 2006–2008
- Preceded by: Glenn Cummings
- Succeeded by: John Piotti

Member of the Maine House of Representatives from the 36th district
- In office December 4, 2002 – December 1, 2010
- Preceded by: Paul Volenik
- Succeeded by: Walter Kumiega

Personal details
- Born: Hannah Marie Pingree; October 18, 1976 (age 50) Belfast, Maine, U.S.
- Party: Democratic
- Spouse: Jason Mann
- Children: 2
- Relatives: Chellie Pingree (mother)
- Education: Brown University (BA)
- Website: Campaign website

Hannah Marie Pingree (born October 18, 1976) is an American politician who is the governor-elect of Maine. She served as the 99th speaker of the Maine House of Representatives from 2008 to 2010. A member of the Democratic Party, she was the second woman to hold the position in Maine history.

Pingree represented District 36 from 2002 to 2010, before leaving office due to state term limits. Most recently, she served as director of the Office of Policy Innovation and the Future under Governor Janet Mills from 2019 to 2025. She is the daughter of US representative Chellie Pingree.

On June 10, 2025, Pingree announced her candidacy for the 2026 Maine gubernatorial election. Pingree won the Democratic nomination on June 9, and defeated Republican Bobby Charles and independent Rick Bennett in the general election.

== Early life and education ==
Hannah Pingree was born on October 18, 1976, in Belfast, Maine. She grew up on the island of North Haven, where her father Charlie Pingree is a boat-builder. Her mother, Chellie Pingree, is a small business owner and has been the U.S. representative for Maine's 1st congressional district since 2009. She graduated from North Haven Community School and Brown University with a degree in political science.

== Political career ==
=== Early career ===
Prior to serving in the Legislature, she was a fundraiser for the unsuccessful United States Senate campaign of her mother Chellie Pingree, who now represents Maine's 1st congressional district in the United States House of Representatives. She also worked for two years in New York City as the political director and "Election 2000" producer for iVillage.com, the largest political internet site for women.

=== Maine Legislature ===
Pingree represented District 36 in the Maine House of Representatives from 2002 to 2010. The district covered North Haven, Vinalhaven, Isle au Haut and the Hancock County towns of Brooklin, Deer Isle, Frenchboro, Stonington, Swan’s Island and Tremont, and part of Mount Desert. In her third term, Pingree became the third woman in Maine history to serve as House Majority Leader and the youngest woman ever to hold the position. She is the second youngest person to hold the position in state history. She was then elected Speaker of the House, serving from 2008 to 2010, becoming the second woman in Maine history to hold the position, and the youngest woman to serve in that position at age 32. After leaving the legislature, Pingree managed the family inn and restaurant, Nebo Lodge, and served on the North Haven Community School Board.

=== Mills administration ===
In 2019, Maine Governor Janet Mills chose Pingree to lead the newly created Office of Policy Innovation and the Future. Pingree resigned from the role in 2025. Shortly thereafter, Pingree launched a campaign for Governor of Maine in the 2026 election.

=== 2026 gubernatorial campaign ===
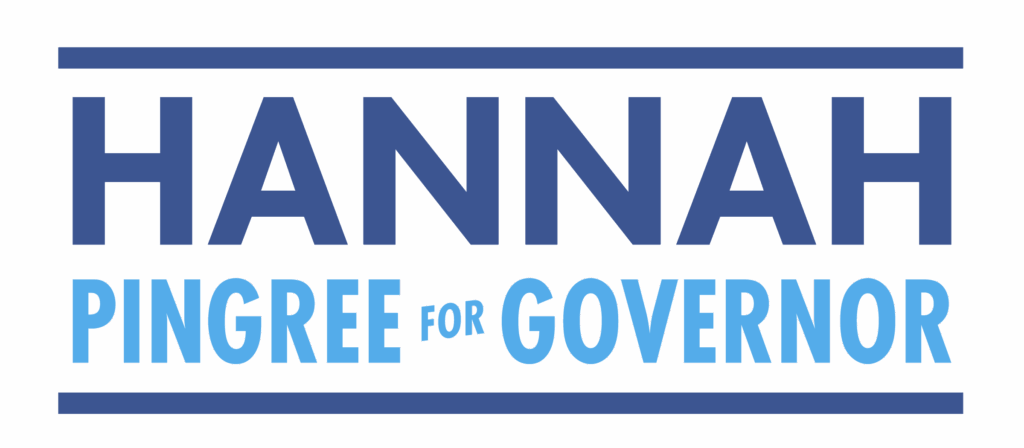
Pingree's gubernatorial campaign logo.

On June 10, 2025, Pingree announced her candidacy for the 2026 Maine gubernatorial election.

The Democratic primary election included Secretary of State Shenna Bellows, former Senate President Troy Jackson, former director of the Maine Centers for Disease Control and Prevention Nirav Shah, and Angus King III, son of incumbent U.S. Senator Angus King. Pingree received the second most first-preference votes behind Shah, but ultimately defeated Shah after four rounds of ranked-choice tabulation, with a 56%–44% margin in the final round.

Pingree defeated Republican Bobby Charles and independent Rick Bennett in the general election.

== Personal life ==
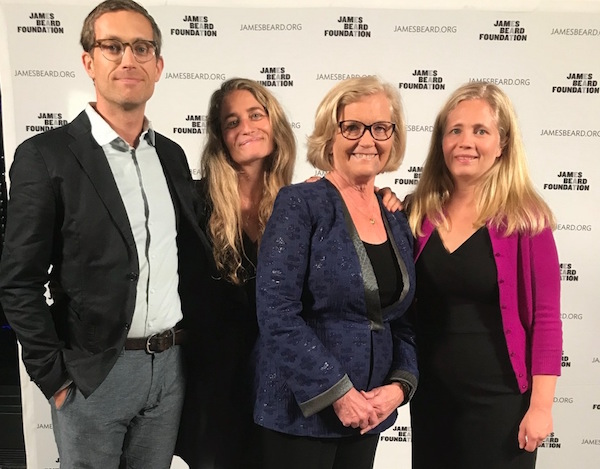
Pingree (far right) and her two siblings and mother (from left to right): Asa, Cecily and Chellie

Pingree is married to Jason Mann and has two children, a son named Oscar and a daughter named Elsie. She and her family reside on North Haven. Her sister, Cecily, is a filmmaker and restaurateur. She also has a brother, Asa.

== Electoral history ==
2002 Maine House of Representatives election, District 129
Party	Candidate	Votes	%
Democratic	Hannah Pingree	2,530	61.6%
Republican	Frank Stanley	1,575	38.4%

2004 Maine House of Representatives election, District 36
Party	Candidate	Votes	%
Democratic	Hannah Pingree	3,770	69.7%
Republican	John C. Bradford	1,642	30.3%

2006 Maine House of Representatives election, District 36
Party	Candidate	Votes	%
Democratic	Hannah Pingree	2,920	68.4%
Republican	Seth G. Joy	1,346	31.6%

2008 Maine House of Representatives election, District 36
Party	Candidate	Votes	%
Democratic	Hannah Pingree	4,447	100%

2026 Maine Democratic gubernatorial primary results
Party	Candidate	Round 1			Round 2			Round 3			Round 4	
Party	Candidate	Votes	%	Transfer	Votes	%	Transfer	Votes	%	Transfer	Votes	%
Democratic	Hannah Pingree	50,552	23.3	+4,808	55,360	26.0	+ 20,311	75,671	36.3	+ 36,079	111,750	56.2
Democratic	Nirav Shah	58,606	26.8	+ 4,255	62,860	29.5	+9,821	72,681	34.8	+ 14,269	86,950	43.8
Democratic	Troy Jackson	45,959	21.1	+ 1,638	47,597	22.3	+ 12,413	60,010	28.8	60,010	Eliminated	
Democratic	Shenna Bellows	44,770	20.6	+ 2,279	47,049	22.1	47,049	Eliminated				
Democratic	Angus King III	17,860	8.3	17,860	Eliminated							
Continuing ballots		217,747	100.0		212,848	97.8		208,542	100.0		198,700	91.1
Exhausted ballots		–		+ 4,881	4,881	2.2	+ 4,504	9,385	4.3	+ 9,662	19,047	8.9
Total votes		217,747	100.0		217,747	100.0		217,747	100.0		217,747	100.0

== See also ==
- List of female governors in the United States

Maine House of Representatives
Preceded by Glenn Cummings	Majority Leader of the Maine House of Representatives; 2006–2008	Succeeded by John Piotti
Preceded by Glenn Cummings	Speaker of the Maine House of Representatives; 2008–2010	Succeeded by Robert Nutting
Party political offices
Preceded by Janet Mills	Democratic nominee for Governor of Maine; 2026	Most recent
Political offices
Preceded by Janet Mills	Governor of Maine; Taking office 2027	Elect
