= Nirav D. Shah =

American epidemiologist, economist and attorney (born 1977)

Nirav Shah
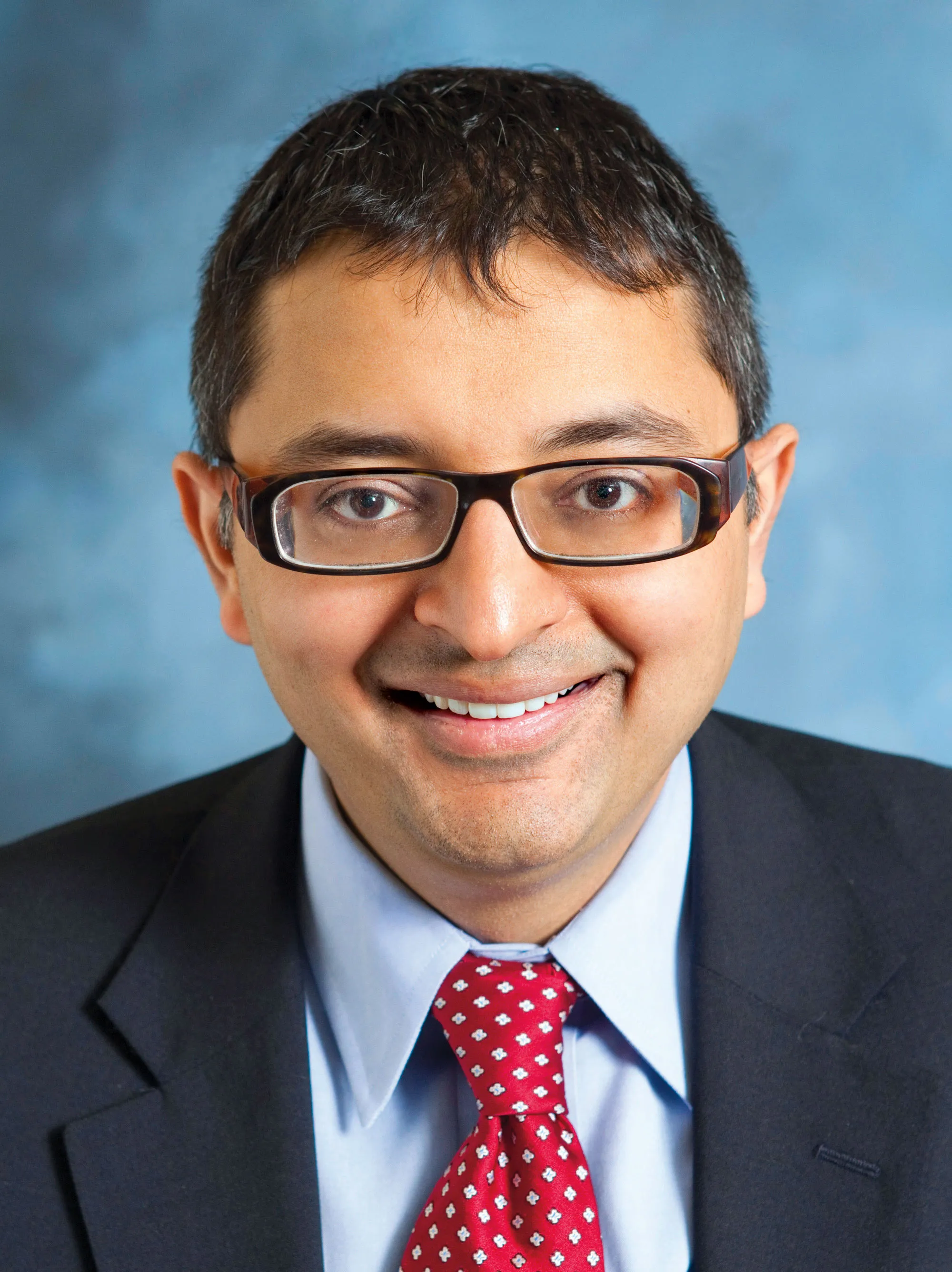
- Official portrait, 2023

Acting Director of the Centers for Disease Control and Prevention
- In office July 1, 2023 – July 10, 2023
- President: Joe Biden
- Preceded by: Rochelle Walensky
- Succeeded by: Mandy Cohen

Principal Deputy Director of the Centers for Disease Control and Prevention
- In office March 2023 – February 2025
- President: Joe Biden; Donald Trump
- Preceded by: Debra Houry (acting)
- Succeeded by: Debra Houry (acting); Ralph Abraham

Director of the Illinois Department of Public Health
- In office 2015–2019
- Governor: Bruce Rauner
- Preceded by: LaMar Hasbrouck
- Succeeded by: Ngozi Ezike

Personal details
- Born: Nirav Dinesh Shah; 1977 (age 48–49) Wisconsin, U.S.
- Party: Democratic
- Education: University of Louisville (BS); University of Chicago (JD, MD)
- Website: Campaign website

Nirav Dinesh Shah (born 1977) is an American epidemiologist, economist, attorney, and politician.

Shah worked as an economist and epidemiologist at the Cambodian Ministry of Health. He served as the director of the Illinois Department of Public Health from 2015 until 2019. During that time, Shah's handling of a Legionnaires' disease outbreak in which 13 people died was heavily criticized, with both Illinois senators calling for his resignation. He served as the director of the Maine Center for Disease Control and Prevention from 2019 to 2023, during the COVID-19 pandemic. He was the principal deputy director of the U.S. Centers for Disease Control and Prevention from 2023 until 2025. In 2025, Shah began to teach courses at Colby College in Waterville, Maine, in public health, public policy, epidemics, and crisis communication.

He ran for governor of Maine in the 2026 election as a Democrat but lost in the primary. After 2026 U.S. Senate nominee Graham Platner withdrew his candidacy, Shah launched a campaign for the U.S. Senate, but withdrew in favor of Troy Jackson after Jackson won a majority of convention delegates.

== Early life and education ==
Shah was born in 1977 in Wisconsin to Dinesh and Shaila Shah, Indian immigrants from Gujarat. He grew up in Medford, Wisconsin.

Shah moved to Mayfield, Kentucky, when he was in junior high school. He graduated valedictorian at Mayfield High School in Mayfield, Kentucky, in 1995. He then attended the University of Louisville, graduating with a degree in biology and psychology in 1999.

Shah studied economics at Oxford before enrolling in medical school at the University of Chicago in 2000. He completed his J.D. degree in 2007 and his M.D. in 2008, both from the University of Chicago, and was a recipient of the Paul & Daisy Soros Fellowships for New Americans.

== Career ==
=== Cambodian Ministry of Health ===
In 2001, Shah accepted a Henry Luce Scholar fellowship in Phnom Penh, Cambodia, working for the Ministry of Health as an economist and epidemiologist. His work included outbreak investigation and management, studying the cost effectiveness of public health programs, efforts to curb the distribution of counterfeit drugs, and combatting corruption in the public health system. By the 2003 conclusion of his experience there, Shah was the chief economist at the Ministry.

While in Cambodia, Shah aided the response to the SARS and Avian influenza outbreaks. In a March 2021 interview, he credited his experiences in Cambodia, as well as his ongoing communication with colleagues in Southeast Asia, with his ability to help prepare Maine for COVID-19 as its state CDC director, especially relating to the early procurement of personal protective equipment.

At the conclusion of the fellowship, Shah returned to the University of Chicago where he continued to work with the Cambodian government. While completing both medical and law school, he regularly videoconferenced with colleagues in Southeast Asia and occasionally traveled back to Cambodia.

=== Law career (2008–15) ===
Following medical school, Shah worked as a health care associate at the law firm Sidley Austin LLP in Chicago from 2008 to 2015. He represented healthcare and life sciences interests.

=== Illinois Department of Public Health (2015–18) ===
In 2015, Illinois governor Bruce Rauner appointed Shah director of the Illinois Department of Public Health (IDPH). During his tenure, Shah worked on initiatives combating the opioid crisis in Illinois, addressing childhood lead poisoning, and reducing maternal and infant mortality.

==== Legionnaires' disease outbreak ====
In August 2015, an outbreak of Legionnaires' disease resulted in 13 deaths and 74 infections at the Illinois Veterans' Home in Quincy, Illinois. Shah was heavily criticized for his response to the outbreak. A 2019 state audit report of the incident indicated that the state CDC did not visit the facility until the 12th day of the outbreak. Although Shah maintained that the agency followed all federal guidelines and moved quickly, according to the State of Illinois Performance Audit:

The Illinois Department of Public Health (IDPH) did not go on-site at Quincy Veterans’ Home until midday on Monday, August 24. That was nearly three days (approximately 67 hours) after the second case was confirmed late in the afternoon on August 21. The site visit focused on one building where the two confirmed cases were located.... During the 2015 outbreak, auditors determined that there was limited communication between IDPH and the Quincy Veterans' Home staff. IDPH officials often did not know the seriousness of the problem at the Quincy Veterans' Home.

Internal agency emails showed that the Illinois Department of Public Health waited six days to notify the public after confirming the outbreak. The state audit also noted that Shah's department disregarded recommendations to immediately seek assistance from the federal Centers for Disease Control and Prevention. Subsequent disclosures indicated that the IDPH was aware of a botched water system repair that had released a "broth of legionella" into the facility's hot water system, an event Shah described internally as a citable offense. The department chose not to issue a citation or penalize the facility for the mistake.

Shah also faced public backlash after internal emails were released showing him using language regarding a veteran's death that he later publicly apologized for and characterized as "insensitive"; he had framed a veteran's death as a public relations battle, stating the state needed a "rebuttal" to "save face publicly" following complaints from a victim's family, rather than focusing on the family's grief or safety concerns. He later publicly apologized for and called his language "insensitive".

Illinois' U.S. Senators Dick Durbin and Tammy Duckworth called for Shah's resignation. They expressed three primary grievances: they said Shah sat on investigative findings, choosing to "deliberately withhold that information from the public" instead of issuing a prompt public health alert; that when Shah’s department found critical water system repair errors that violated state health codes, Shah acknowledged the violations internally but chose not to issue a formal citation to the facility; and alleged that Shah was "more focused on public perception" than intervening effectively." But Shah remained in his position until Rauner lost his re-election bid in 2018.

==== Aftermath ====
In October 2018, Illinois Attorney General Lisa Madigan initiated a criminal investigation into Shah's department's handling of the fatal Legionnaires' disease outbreaks. As part of the probe, an Adams County grand jury subpoenaed thousands of administrative records and emails from Shah's department to determine whether department leadership committed official misconduct or criminal negligence by delaying notifying families and the public for six days regarding the bacterial contamination. The investigation concluded without any criminal charges or indictments being filed.

However, the internal communications, state audits, and evidentiary findings compiled during the Attorney General's criminal investigation directly substantiated concurrent civil litigation, establishing that officials were internally aware of water-system repair failures but actively chose not to issue regulatory citations or prompt public warnings. This evidentiary crossover eliminated the state's viable defenses. As a result, in April 2020, the State of Illinois resolved several wrongful death and negligence lawsuits by paying a $6.4 million civil settlement to compensate families of 11 deceased veterans and one visitor who died in the outbreak to legally resolve the liability surrounding the facility's management.

=== Maine Center for Disease Control and Prevention (2019–22) ===
In June 2019, Maine Governor Janet Mills appointed Shah as the director of the Maine Center for Disease Control and Prevention. He immediately sought to fill more than 100 vacancies within the department. A few weeks after he began, a group of more than 200 asylum seekers arrived in Portland, Maine, and were temporarily housed at the Portland Exposition Building. In his first public actions as CDC Director, Shah visited the facility, dispatched public health nurses to vaccinate the families and conduct health screenings, and worked with local healthcare providers to provide basic needs.

Beginning March 9, 2020, Shah began delivering daily press conferences regarding the status of the COVID-19 pandemic and the Maine CDC's preparedness. As the pandemic developed, Shah received praise for his communication style, delivering information using measured, detailed and simple answers, real-life examples, and effective metaphors devoid of scientific jargon. For example, when asked to detail proper hand washing techniques to prevent the spread of COVID-19, Shah explained “Wash your hands as if you have just sliced a bag of jalapeño peppers and now need to take out your contact lenses.”

Shah embraced three principles for his regular briefings: Be truthful, answer questions directly, and "acknowledge the statistics and numbers without overlooking the human element." Public health experts praised his enduring compassion as he consistently reminded viewers that each case number and death represented a family member, friend and neighbor. Shah also frequently included song lyrics and Dad jokes in an attempt to bring appropriate levity to his pandemic reports.

Shah's communication style and public face led to a significant following throughout Maine: A "Fans of Dr. Nirav Shah" Facebook page reached over 35,000 members. Stickers, T-shirts and mugs with Shah's likeness and the slogan "In Shah We Trust" and "Keep Calm and Listen to Dr. Shah" were printed and sold to benefit local nonprofits. Local confectioner Wilbur's of Maine produced "Shah bars" with his photo on the wrapper.

Shah faced ethical and scientific criticism from public health researchers and some ethicists for implementing an age-based vaccine rollout that prioritized speed over targeting specific vulnerable populations, which critics argued delayed timely vaccine access for individuals with high-risk conditions such as Down syndrome, hematological cancers, severe obesity, or being the recipient of an organ donation —all of which are associated with a higher mortality rate. According to several studies by the Maine Center for Disease Control and Prevention, particular disabilities and medical conditions put younger people at a greater risk for severe illness, according to experts. The parent of a child with a pre-existing condition objected that he should have targeted specific vulnerable populations instead. Shah later said that his decision was based on data from other states which he said made clear to him that speed needed to be prioritized over everything else and he said that Maine's results proved his decision correct.

In early 2021, Shah became President of the Association of State and Territorial Health Officials (ASTHO), a position he held until the following year, and he prioritized states' preparation for COVID-19 vaccine rollouts nationwide.

=== U.S. Centers for Disease Control and Prevention (2023–25) ===
Shah was the Principal Deputy Director of the U.S. Centers for Disease Control and Prevention (CDC) from March 2023 until February 2025. He served as the acting director of the CDC and in that capacity he also served as the Acting Administrator of the Agency for Toxic Substances and Disease Registry.

=== Colby College ===
Shah began teaching courses in the fall of 2025 in the Department of Statistics at Colby College in Waterville, Maine, on public health, epidemics and crisis communication.

== Politics ==
=== 2026 gubernatorial campaign ===
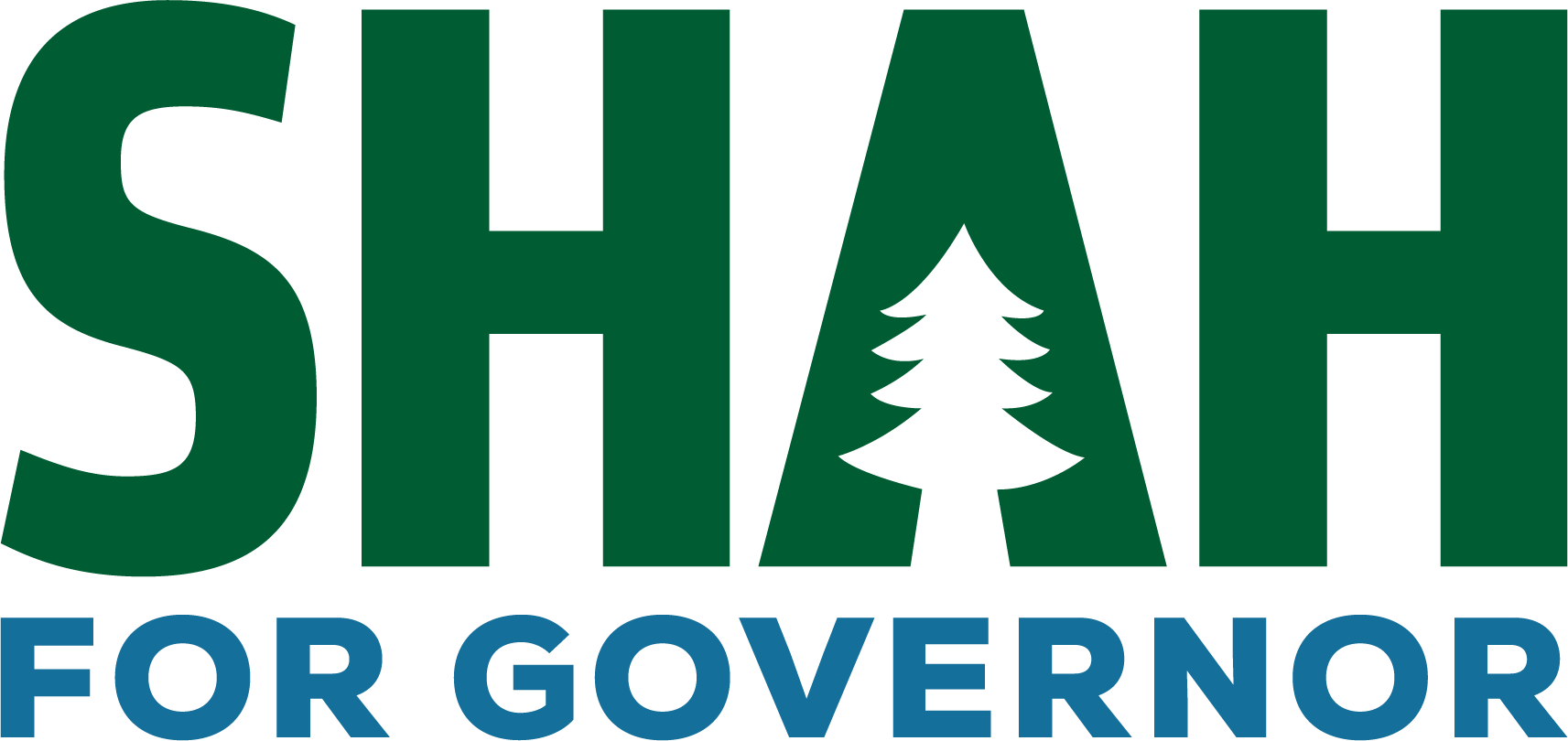
Logo for Shah's gubernatorial campaign.

Shah announced a campaign for Governor of Maine in the 2026 election as a Democrat on October 20, 2025. He received the most first-preference votes of any candidate in the Democratic primary, at 27%, but following the redistribution of votes under Maine's system of ranked-choice voting Shah lost to Hannah Pingree, who defeated him 56% to 44%.

=== 2026 U.S. Senate campaign ===
After 2026 U.S. Senate nominee Graham Platner withdrew his candidacy, Shah launched a campaign for the U.S. Senate. Democratic U.S. Senators Tammy Duckworth and Dick Durbin of Illinois strongly opposed his candidacy due to his performance during the Illinois Veterans' Home Legionnaires' outbreak. Shah withdrew from the race on July 19 after Troy Jackson won a majority of delegates to the special nominating convention.

== Personal life ==
Shah and his wife Kara Palamountain, a research professor at Northwestern University in Illinois, are avid home cooks. He speaks English, Khmer, Gujarati, and some Spanish. Shah is a Jain.

== Electoral history ==
2026 Maine Democratic gubernatorial primary results
Party	Candidate	Round 1			Round 2			Round 3			Round 4	
Party	Candidate	Votes	%	Transfer	Votes	%	Transfer	Votes	%	Transfer	Votes	%
Democratic	Hannah Pingree	50,552	23.3	+4,808	55,360	26.0	+ 20,311	75,671	36.3	+ 36,079	111,750	56.2
Democratic	Nirav Shah	58,606	26.8	+ 4,255	62,860	29.5	+9,821	72,681	34.8	+ 14,269	86,950	43.8
Democratic	Troy Jackson	45,959	21.1	+ 1,638	47,597	22.3	+ 12,413	60,010	28.8	60,010	Eliminated	
Democratic	Shenna Bellows	44,770	20.6	+ 2,279	47,049	22.1	47,049	Eliminated				
Democratic	Angus King III	17,860	8.3	17,860	Eliminated							
Continuing ballots		217,747	100.0		212,848	97.8		208,542	100.0		198,700	91.1
Exhausted ballots		–		+ 4,881	4,881	2.2	+ 4,504	9,385	4.3	+ 9,662	19,047	8.9
Total votes		217,747	100.0		217,747	100.0		217,747	100.0		217,747	100.0

Government offices
Preceded by Rochelle Walensky	Director of the Centers for Disease Control and Prevention; Acting; 2023	Succeeded by Mandy Cohen
