= Jonathan Bush =

American banker (1931–2021)

- Born: Jonathan James Bush; May 6, 1931; Greenwich, Connecticut, U.S.
- Died: May 5, 2021 (aged 89); Jupiter, Florida, U.S.
- Education: Yale University
- Occupation: Banker
- Political party: Republican
- Spouse: Josephine Colwell Bradley (m. 1967)
- Children: Jonathan S. Bush; Billy Bush
- Parent(s): Prescott Sheldon Bush; Dorothy Walker Bush
- Relatives: See Bush family

Jonathan James Bush (May 6, 1931 – May 5, 2021) was an American banker. Bush was the fourth child and third son of U.S. senator Prescott Bush and his wife Dorothy Bush.

== Early life ==
Bush was born in Greenwich, Connecticut, to Prescott Sheldon Bush, a politician, and Dorothy Wear Walker Bush (July 1, 1901 – November 19, 1992). He graduated from The Hotchkiss School and Yale University, where he was a member of Skull and Bones. The fourth child in the family, he was the brother of Prescott Bush Jr. (1922–2010), the 41st president of the United States George H. W. Bush (1924–2018), Nancy Bush Ellis (1926–2021), and William "Bucky" Bush (1938–2018). He was the uncle of the 43rd president George W. Bush. Like his brother George H. W. Bush, he was a member of Delta Kappa Epsilon fraternity at Yale.

Bush and his wife Josephine are the parents of entertainment reporter Billy Bush and health care executive Jonathan S. Bush.

== Career ==
As of December 31, 2018, Jonathan Bush had retired from Fairfield, Bush & Co., an investment advisory firm in New Haven, Connecticut.

Jonathan Bush founded J. Bush & Co., which provided discreet banking services for the Washington, D.C., embassies of foreign governments for many years. In 1997, Riggs Bank bought J. Bush & Co. and made Bush CEO & President of Riggs Investment, a firm based in New Haven, Connecticut.

In the early 1980s, Jonathan Bush helped organize investors for George W. Bush's first oil venture, Arbusto Energy, later called Bush Explorations.

During the 2000 presidential campaign, Bush was a major contributor and fundraiser to his nephew's election and was named a "Bush Pioneer" for raising more than $100,000 for the campaign.

Bush died on May 5, 2021, the day before his 90th birthday. At the time of his death, he was the last surviving child of Prescott Bush and Dorothy Walker Bush.

== Controversy ==
On May 15, 2004, The Washington Post published an article that said, "A political Web site written by a Democratic operative drew attention yesterday to the fact that President Bush's uncle, Jonathan J. Bush, is a top executive at Riggs Bank, which this week agreed to pay a record $25 million in civil fines for violations of law intended to thwart money laundering."

The bank accounts under investigation may have been Saudi, though the article did not say so. It did, however, go on to say: "a source familiar with the multiple federal investigations of the bank's Saudi accounts and other embassy accounts say Jonathan Bush's investment advice unit has 'no relationship whatsoever' with any of the Riggs's Saudi accounts." Moreover, the newspaper quoted a spokesman for the Office of the Comptroller of the Currency as saying "any suggestion of political influence in the Riggs situation is 'preposterous.'"

In 1991, Bush was fined $30,000 in Massachusetts and several thousand dollars in Connecticut for violating registration laws governing securities sales. He was barred from securities brokerage with the general public in Massachusetts for one year.
