= Jonathan S. Bush =

American businessman

Jonathan Bush
- Born: March 10, 1969 (age 57)
- Education: Boston University (attended); Wesleyan University (BA); Harvard University (MBA)
- Political party: Republican
- Children: 7
- Parent: Jonathan Bush (father)
- Relatives: See Bush family
- Website: Campaign website

Jonathan S. Bush (born March 10, 1969) is an American technology entrepreneur and politician, best known as the cofounder and former chief executive officer of Athenahealth, a Watertown, Massachusetts-based healthcare technology company founded in 1997. On June 6, 2018, Bush resigned from his position as CEO of Athenahealth during an activist campaign by Elliott Management. He campaigned for Governor of Maine in the 2026 election but lost the Republican primary.

== Early life and education ==
Bush is the son of Josephine Colwell Bradley and Jonathan Bush. Jonathan S. Bush is the cousin of U.S. President George W. Bush, nephew of U.S. President George H. W. Bush, and brother of television presenter Billy Bush. He grew up in Manhattan and attended the Allen-Stevenson School.

Bush graduated from Phillips Academy in Andover, Massachusetts. He graduated from Wesleyan University in 1993, and earned a Master of Business Administration degree from Harvard University in 1997.

== Personal life ==
Bush is married and has seven children. In May 2018, a report detailed Bush's verbal and physical abuse towards his first wife. Although claims were dropped after further investigation, Bush has publicly admitted to battering his ex-wife, including punching her multiple times in the sternum while she held one of their young children, and at one point giving her a black eye. He is currently married to Fay Rotenberg.

== Business career ==
=== Early career ===
Bush took time off from college to work on George H. W. Bush's 1988 presidential campaign. As an EMT, Bush spent a summer vacation during college operating a 911 response ambulance in New Orleans. In 1991, Bush volunteered to become a combat medic at the start of Operation Desert Storm, doing boot camp at Fort Jackson in South Carolina, but did not ship out because the war ended before he finished.

Bush's worked as an associate at J. Bush & Company, Inc., a firm founded by his father that assisted foreign embassies in banking, and as a consultant at Booz Allen Hamilton, where he was a member of its Managed Care Strategy Group.

=== Athenahealth ===
In 1997, Bush and Todd Park, a colleague from Booz Allen, founded Athena Women's Health, a women's health and birthing clinic housed in San Diego for soon-to-be, new, and current mothers. After Park's brother Ed Park helped develop its system, Athena Women's Health transformed into Athenahealth, a healthcare technology platform offering a suite of services to help hospital and ambulatory providers coordinate care and work at the tops of their licenses. In 2000, Bush raised more than $10 million in venture capital funding to support Athenahealth, which launched a successful IPO in 2007. Bush was the company's CEO until his resignation on June 6, 2018, under pressure from shareholders and women's activists following allegations of misconduct in which he proportedly created a "sexually hostile work environment" for at least one female employee.

=== Zus Health ===
Bush is listed as the Founder & Chief Executive Officer of Zus Health.

== Politics ==
On July 14, 2025, Bush formed an exploratory committee to prepare a run for the Republican nomination in the 2026 Maine gubernatorial election. Bush held a campaign fundraiser in Kennebunkport in August 2025, and formally announced his campaign on October 8. Bush lost in the Republican primary on June 9, 2026.

== Publications ==
Bush is the author, with Stephen L. Baker, of the New York Times bestseller Where Does It Hurt?: An Entrepreneur's Guide to Fixing Health Care (Penguin, May 2014).

== Honors and awards ==
In 2013, Bush was named CEO of the Year by the Massachusetts Technology Leadership Council (MassTLC). In 2016 he received the Tufts Medical Center's Ellen M. Zane Award for Visionary Leadership. Fortune included Bush as a "disruptor" in its list of "34 Leaders Who Are Changing Healthcare," writing that "few are more persuasive—and outspoken—about the need to repair our healthcare system."

== Ancestry ==
Ancestors of Jonathan S. Bush

Samuel Bush; 1863-1948
Prescott Bush; 1895-1972
Flora Sheldon
Jonathan Bush; 1931-2021
George Herbert Walker; 1875-1953
Dorothy Walker; 1901-1992
Lucretia Wear
Jonathan Bush born 1969
Josephine Bradley
