= Rick Bennett (Maine politician) =

American politician (born 1963)

- Bennett in 2012

Member of the Maine Senate
- Incumbent
- Assumed office December 2, 2020
- Preceded by: James Hamper
- Constituency: 19th district (2020–22); 18th district (2022–)
- In office December 4, 1996 – December 1, 2004
- Preceded by: Dana Hanley
- Succeeded by: Kenneth Gagnon
- Constituency: 25th district

Chair of the Maine Republican Party
- In office July 20, 2013 – January 29, 2017
- Preceded by: Richard Cebra
- Succeeded by: Demi Kouzounas

President of the Maine Senate
- In office December 6, 2001 – December 4, 2002
- Preceded by: Mike Michaud
- Succeeded by: Beverly Daggett

Member of the Maine House of Representatives from the 50th district
- In office December 5, 1990 – December 7, 1994
- Preceded by: Joseph Walker
- Succeeded by: Thomas Davidson

Personal details
- Born: May 24, 1963 (age 63) Portland, Maine, U.S.
- Party: Republican (before 2025); Independent (2025–present)
- Spouse: Karen Bennett
- Children: 2
- Education: Harvard University (BA); University of Southern Maine (MBA)
- Website: Campaign website

Richard A. Bennett (born May 24, 1963) is an American businessman and politician from the state of Maine. Initially elected as a Republican, he currently serves in the Maine Senate as an independent. He ran for Governor of Maine in the 2026 election, finishing third behind Republican nominee Robert B. Charles and the victor, Democratic nominee Hannah Pingree. Bennett previously served as President of the Maine Senate from 2001–2002.

Bennett was the Republican nominee for Maine's 2nd congressional district in 1994, losing to Democrat John Baldacci, and was a candidate in the 2012 U.S. Senate election, losing the Republican primary to Charlie Summers. He has served in the Maine Senate since 2020.

== Political career ==
As a resident of Norway, Maine, Bennett was first elected to the Maine House of Representatives in 1990. He was re-elected unopposed in 1992. In 1994, Bennett was the Republican nominee for Congress in Maine's second district, losing to Democrat John Baldacci in a close race. The seat, which had been held by Republican Olympia Snowe, was one of only two Republican-held seats won by Democrats in the 1994 House elections in what was otherwise a landslide victory for the GOP.

Bennett was elected to the State Senate in 1996, and served until he was term limited in 2004. He became the president of the Maine Senate in 2001 as the result of a unique power-sharing agreement between Republicans and Democrats predicated on an even split in state senators. The deal gave the presidency to both parties for one year each during each two-year senate term.

On May 2, 2008, he was elected to a four-year term as Maine's Republican national committeeman.

In 2006, he considered running for Governor of Maine, but decided to remain in the private sector instead, though he did serve as Republican nominee Chandler Woodcock's campaign co-chair. His name was widely circulated as a possible candidate for the Republican nomination for governor in 2010, but he ultimately decided against running. In 2012, Bennett sought the Republican nomination for the U.S. Senate seat vacated by Olympia Snowe but was defeated in the primary by Maine Secretary of State Charlie Summers. Summers ultimately would be defeated by independent Angus King.

On July 20, 2013, Bennett was elected chairman of the Maine Republican Party, replacing former state representative Richard Cebra of Naples. In 2015, Bennett was unanimously re-elected as chairman of the Maine Republican Party. He was a Republican elector for Donald Trump in the 2016 presidential election for Maine's second congressional district. He would serve until 2017, being replaced by Demi Kouzounas.

In 2020, Bennett returned to electoral office for the first time since 2004 by winning a state senate seat, outrunning Donald Trump at the top of the ticket. He was re-elected in 2022 and 2024, significantly outrunning 2022 gubernatorial candidate Paul LePage and Trump in both elections.

=== 2026 gubernatorial campaign ===
On June 24, 2025, Bennett announced that he would run for governor of Maine in 2026 as an independent, ending his lifelong affiliation with the Republican Party. In the months preceding the launch of his campaign, Bennett had publicly diverged from the GOP, crossing party lines to vote against a Republican bill that would have restricted transgender students from participating in school sports, and joining Democrats in voting for a bill that would limit local police in Maine from collaborating with Immigrations and Customs Enforcement. He was the sole Republican to vote with the Democrats on both bills, on what were otherwise party-line votes.

If elected, Bennett would be Maine's third independent governor, after James B. Longley (1975–1979) and Angus King (1995–2003). He would be the first that is a former Republican; both Longley and King were previously Democrats.

In November 2025, Bennett's campaign received the endorsement of the Forward Party, a "post-partisan" political movement founded by entrepreneur and former Democratic presidential candidate Andrew Yang.

On June 16, 2026, Bennett said he chose to vote in the Democratic primary rather than the Republican primary. Both primaries had been held a week before, and voters not enrolled in a party are allowed to choose which party's primary to vote in.

Bennett faced Democratic nominee Hannah Pingree and Republican nominee Robert B. Charles in the general election. Bennett finished in third with 8% of the vote as Pingree won the election.

== Private sector ==
Bennett is the president and CEO of ValueEdge Advisors, a firm he founded in summer 2014 to help institutional investors engage with their portfolio companies. From 2006 to 2014 he was CEO of The Corporate Library and then chairman or vice chairman of GMI Ratings, its successor company, an independent research firm focusing on corporate governance, director/executive compensation, and forensic accounting. For six years, Bennett was included in the NACD Directorship's "100 most influential people" in the boardroom and corporate governance community.

Political offices
Preceded by Mike Michaud	President of the Maine Senate; 2001–2002	Succeeded by Beverly Daggett
Party political offices
Preceded by Richard Cebra	Chair of the Maine Republican Party; 2013–2017	Succeeded by Demi Kouzounas
