= 2026 United States Senate election in Maine =

- November 3, 2026
- Turnout: 65.7% (▼10.1 pp)
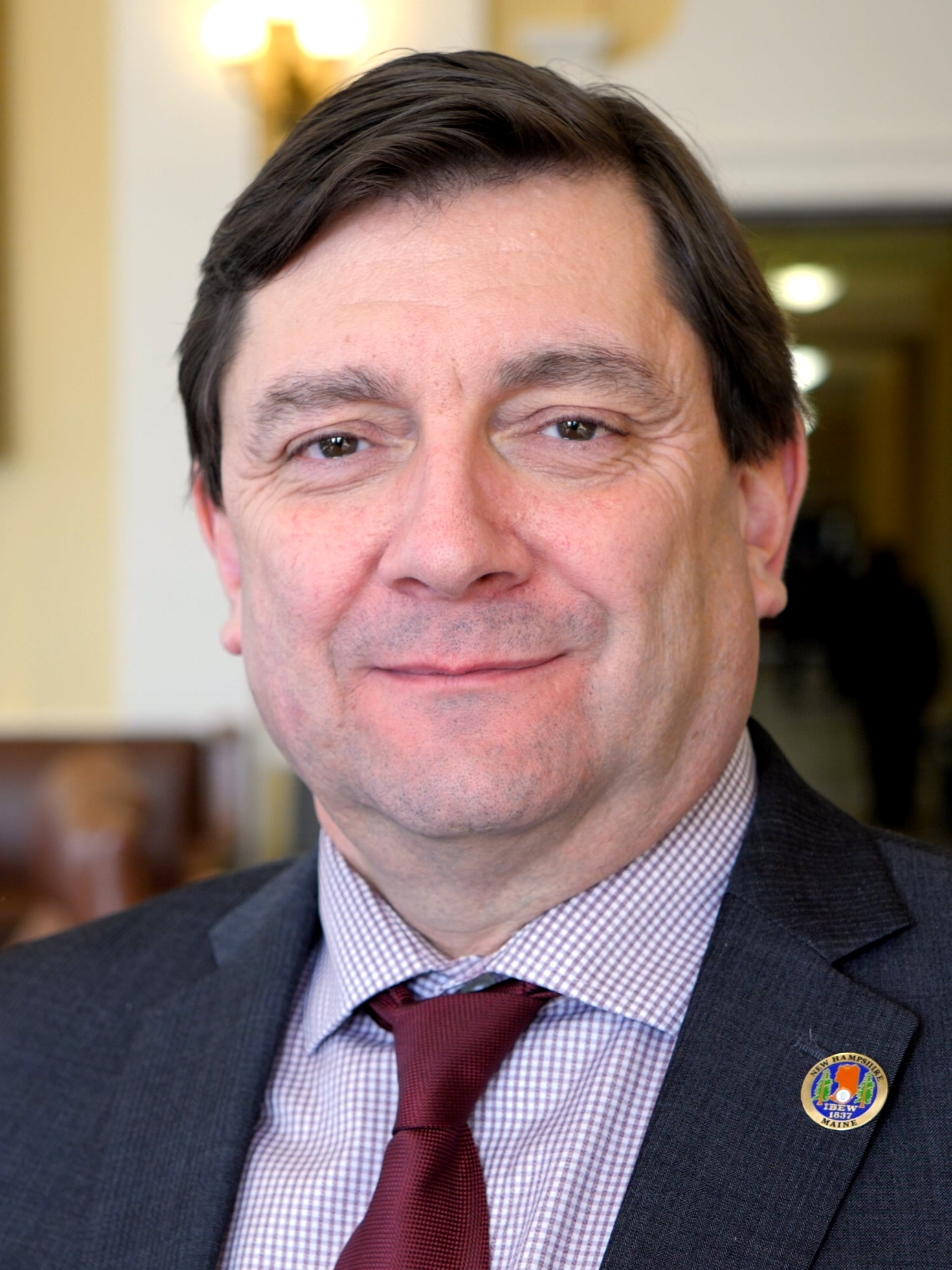

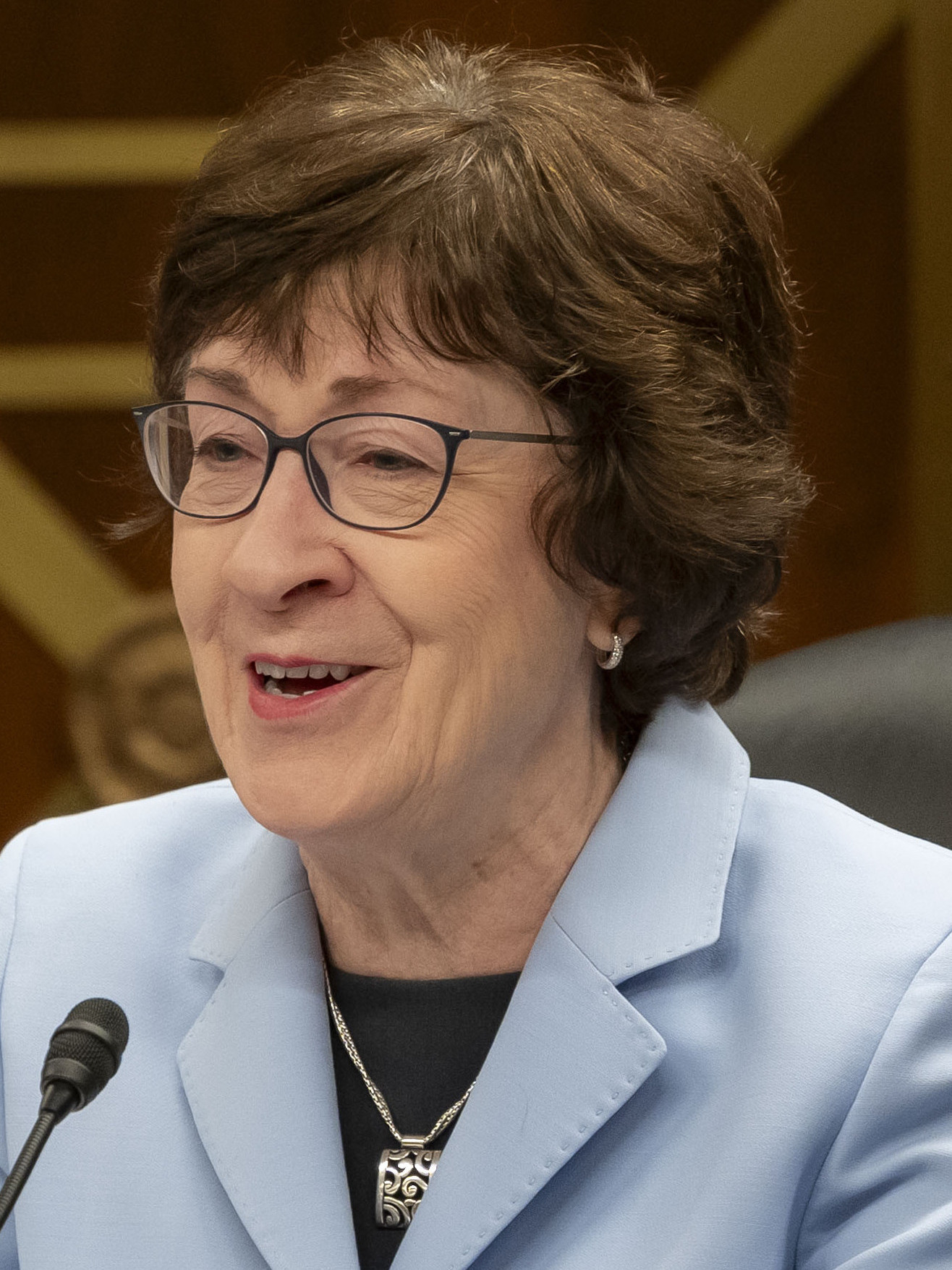
Nominee	Troy Jackson (replaced Graham Platner)	Susan Collins
Party	Democratic	Republican
Popular vote	376,955	332,918
Percentage	53.07%	46.87%
- Jackson: 50–60% 60–70% 70–80% 80–90% >90% Collins: 50–60% 60–70% 70–80% 80–90% >90% No votes
U.S. senator before election
Susan Collins
Republican
Elected U.S. senator
Troy Jackson
Democratic

The 2026 United States Senate election in Maine was held on November 3, 2026, to elect a member of the United States Senate to represent the state of Maine. Democratic former state Senate president Troy Jackson defeated Republican incumbent Susan Collins. The election was conducted with ranked-choice voting.

Primary elections were held on June 9. Collins, seeking a sixth term, was the only candidate to qualify for the Republican nomination. Sullivan harbor master Graham Platner won the Democratic primary over Governor Janet Mills with the support of progressive figures, but withdrew on July 10 amid accusations of sexual assault and other controversies. A party convention selected Jackson to replace Platner as the Democratic nominee on July 25.

This was the only Republican-held seat in a state President Donald Trump lost in the 2024 election. Although Jackson frequently led in polling, onlookers were cautious in anticipating a flip due to Collins having outperformed polls in the 2020 Senate election. Jackson is the first Democrat to win a Senate election in Maine since 1988, while Collins is Maine's first incumbent senator to lose re-election since 1978. Collins' loss additionally marks the first time since the party's founding in 1854 that New England will have no Republicans representing the region in the Senate.

== Background ==
The election was held on November 3, 2026, coinciding with U.S. House elections, a gubernatorial election, and other local elections. Both the primary and general elections were conducted with ranked-choice voting. Incumbent Republican U.S. senator Susan Collins ran for re-election to a sixth term. Both primary elections took place on June 9, 2026. The northernmost state in New England, Maine is considered to be a moderately blue state. Maine has voted for every Democratic presidential nominee since 1992, and Democratic nominee Kamala Harris defeated Republican nominee Donald Trump by approximately seven percentage points in the 2024 United States presidential election in Maine. Democrats also control the governorship, the state legislature, and both seats in Maine's U.S. House congressional delegation. Since 2018, Collins has been the only Republican representing any New England state in either chamber of Congress.

Collins was first elected in 1996. She has been re-elected in four subsequent elections, significantly outperforming other Republicans in the state. In 2020, despite almost all polls and analysts predicting that she would lose her re-election bid, Collins defeated Democratic nominee Sara Gideon by a nine-point margin. Democratic presidential nominee Joe Biden carried Maine by about nine percentage points on the same ballot. This election was expected to be among the most competitive Senate races in 2026. Collins is the only Republican senator who represents one of the 19 states that Donald Trump did not win in any of his three presidential campaigns. With the decline of ticket splitting, Collins was widely viewed as one of the most vulnerable incumbent Republican senators in 2026. Collins was also the only Republican senator facing re-election in a state that Kamala Harris won in the 2024 presidential election. Since the 2024 United States Senate elections, Collins has been the last senator to represent a non-swing state (in other words, a reliably Democratic or Republican state) that typically supports the opposing party.

== Republican primary ==
Incumbent U.S. senator Susan Collins officially announced her re-election bid in February 2026. Despite Collins receiving backlash from some Republicans for not supporting all of Trump's agenda during his second term as president, the Republican Party nonetheless supports her re-election campaign due to the fact that she is the only Republican who has been electorally successful in Maine in recent years. However, she faced an unsuccessful primary challenge from former police officer Dan Smeriglio, who argued that she votes with Senate Democrats too often. Ultimately, Collins was the only Republican to qualify for the primary ballot.

=== Candidates ===
==== Nominee ====
- Susan Collins, incumbent U.S. senator (1997–present)

==== Withdrawn ====
- Carmen Calabrese, restaurant owner
- Bill Clarke, entrepreneur and Constitution Party nominee for U.S. Senate in 1996 and for governor in 1998
- Dan Smeriglio, former police officer

=== Endorsements ===
Susan Collins

Executive branch officials

- JD Vance, vice president of the United States (2025–present)

U.S. senators

- Steve Daines, Montana (2015–present)
- Mitt Romney, former Senator from Utah (2019–2025)
- Tim Scott, South Carolina (2013–present)
- John Thune, Senate majority leader (2025–present) from South Dakota (2005–present)

State legislators

- Laurel Libby, state representative from the 20th district (2020–present)

Organizations

- AIPAC
- ClearPath Foundation
- Log Cabin Republicans
- National Republican Senatorial Committee
- No Labels
- Republican Jewish Coalition
- Senate Leadership Fund
Declined to endorse

Executive branch officials

- Donald Trump, president of the United States (2017–2021, 2025–present)

=== Fundraising ===
Italics indicate a withdrawn candidate

Campaign finance reports as of May 20, 2026
Candidate	Raised	Spent	Cash on hand
Carmen Calabrese (R)	$17,760	$21,260	$0.00
Susan Collins (R)	$14,925,296	$6,547,574	$9,672,914
Source: Federal Election Commission

According to Federal Election Commission (FEC) records as of October 2026, Collins has received $4,525,846 from political action committees (PACs) affiliated with pro-Israel lobbies; of this amount, $3,670,038 is attributed to the 2026 election cycle.

=== Polling ===
Poll source	Date(s) administered	Sample size (Note: Key: A – all adults RV – registered voters LV – likely voters V – unclear)	Margin of error	Carmen Calabrese	Susan Collins	Dan Smeriglio	Other	Undecided
	March 1, 2026	Calabrese withdraws						
University of New Hampshire	February 12–16, 2026	417 (LV)	± 4.9%	1%	67%	6%	1% (Note: "Another candidate" with 1%)	25%
University of New Hampshire	October 16–21, 2025	417 (LV)	± 4.8%	1%	66%	1%	4% (Note: "Write in someone else" with 4%)	27%

=== Results ===
Republican primary results
Party	Candidate	Votes	%
Republican	Susan Collins (incumbent)	126,398	100.0
Total votes		126,398	100.0

== Democratic primary ==
In April 2025, former congressional staffer Jordan Wood became the first Democrat to enter the race, running on a platform opposed to the Trump administration and Elon Musk. On August 19, Sullivan harbor master Graham Platner launched a progressive campaign backed by Bernie Sanders and organized labor, positioning himself against the "Democratic establishment" and drawing support from both liberal voters and some 2024 Trump voters. In February 2026, Politico described Platner as "unlike any other recent popular candidate the state has seen". Noting Platner's large social media following, Politico added: "He is brash. He is progressive. He has drawn crowds of hundreds of people, national attention and millions in campaign dollars."

After weeks of speculation and leaked campaign plans, Governor Janet Mills entered the race in October 2025. The DSCC's close involvement in her campaign prompted backlash and allegations of favoritism in the primary. Mills was widely viewed as a top Democratic recruit; she was encouraged to run by Senate Minority Leader Chuck Schumer, Senator Kirsten Gillibrand, and the Democratic Senatorial Campaign Committee (DSCC), although Sanders publicly discouraged her candidacy. Following Mills's entry, several candidates, including Dan Kleban and Daira Smith-Rodriguez, withdrew and endorsed Mills. Smith-Rodriguez cited concerns over past comments by Platner regarding sexual assault in the military. Wood later withdrew to run for the U.S. House.

In January 2026, Platner briefly paused his campaign due to his wife's medical treatment abroad before resuming later that month. He returned to the campaign trail with protests against Immigrations and Customs Enforcement (ICE) actions. In February 2026, Mills committed to multiple debates ahead of the June 9 primary. Mills, Platner, and 2024 nominee David Costello qualified for the primary ballot. In addition, University of Maine adjunct professor Andrea LaFlamme started a write-in bid for the Democratic nomination. The Platner/Mills contest was seen as a key contest between the Democratic Party's centrist establishment wing and the populist, left-wing, and progressive faction, with Mills representing the former and Platner representing the latter.

In March 2026, Mills began running attack ads highlighting Platner's controversies. By April 2026, multiple polls had been released which showed Mills as much as 38 points behind Platner in the primary. Shortly thereafter, the Mills campaign stopped running the attack ads and had made no additional ad purchases across any platform, leading to rumors that she would withdraw from the race. On April 30, Mills announced that she was suspending her campaign, but she did not endorse Platner. Her withdrawal led to Schumer and Gillibrand announcing they would now help Platner to defeat Susan Collins. Following the end of Mills' campaign, Platner was the only prominent and competitive Democrat left in the race, making him the most likely Democratic nominee. Mills' name remained on the primary ballot, and Costello also continued his campaign. On June 9, Platner won the primary; he received over 150,000 votes, more than any other Democratic candidate in a primary in Maine's history.

=== Platner misconduct controversies ===
Shortly after Mills entered the race, Platner came under fire for resurfaced controversial Reddit posts criticizing police officers, calling rural Americans "stupid" and referring to himself as a "communist", resulting in his campaign's political director, former state representative Genevieve McDonald, quitting the campaign and calling Platner "unelectable"; however, Democratic National Committee Chair Ken Martin stated that the comments were not disqualifying, and Platner apologized in a five-minute video posted to social media. On October 21, Platner released a video of himself dancing and singing shirtless at his brother's wedding, revealing he had a chest tattoo that resembled the Totenkopf used by Nazi Germany's Schutzstaffel. Platner stated he got the tattoo while inebriated with other U.S. Marines while stationed in Croatia, mistaking the symbol for a generic skull and crossbones. He had the tattoo covered, and professed his shame and disgust for getting a tattoo that resembled the fascist insignia. Platner also called himself an anti-fascist "supersoldier" in an old Reddit comment.

After the controversies, Democrats such as Senator Chris Murphy defended Platner and said that he "sounds like a human being" who is honest about his mistakes. Senator Ruben Gallego called his campaign "authentic" and said that he has "the right to grow out of his stupidity" and is not going to be a "crypto-Fetterman". On February 26, 2026, Platner quote-tweeted a clip from Donald Trump's 2026 State of the Union Address, criticizing Trump's speech. The clip had been posted by anti-Semitic white supremacist Stew Peters. The tweet was deleted hours later, with a spokesperson for Platner's campaign telling The Hill that they were unaware of Peters's views.

In May 2026, reports surfaced that Platner's wife had alerted his campaign team to explicit messages he was sending to women on the messaging app Kik, expressing concern that the behavior could hurt him politically. Additional reports during the same period drew attention to Platner's Nazi-linked tattoos, as well as past social media posts widely described as bigoted. In June 2026, The New York Times published an article including allegations of physical abuse and "unsettling" behavior from multiple women. In response, Platner told media that his poor behavior was attributed to PTSD from his service in the Marine Corps. While he specifically denied the accusations made by one woman, he did not dispute the characterization of his behavior toward a second one.

=== Candidates ===
==== Withdrew after nomination ====
- Graham Platner, Sullivan harbor master

==== Eliminated in primary ====
- David Costello, former deputy secretary of the Maryland Department of the Environment and nominee for U.S. Senate in 2024
- Andrea LaFlamme, adjunct professor at the University of Maine (write-in candidate)
- Janet Mills, governor of Maine (2019–present) (suspended campaign)

==== Withdrawn ====
- Natasha Alcala, fashion designer
- David Evans, former Department of Defense policy writer
- Tucker Favreau, cybersecurity professional
- Dan Kleban, brewery owner (endorsed Mills)
- Daira Smith-Rodriguez, former civilian contracting officer for the U.S. Air Force (endorsed Mills)
- Jordan Wood, former chief of staff to former U.S. Representative Katie Porter (ran for U.S. House; endorsed Platner)

==== Declined ====
- Aaron Frey, Maine attorney general (2019–present) (endorsed Mills)
- Jared Golden, U.S. representative from Maine's 2nd congressional district (2019–present)
- Chellie Pingree, U.S. representative from Maine's 1st congressional district (2009–present) and nominee for U.S. Senate in 2002 (running for re-election)

=== Endorsements ===
Graham Platner

Executive branch officials

- ~~Robert Reich, former U.S. secretary of labor (1993–1997)~~ (endorsement rescinded after primary)
- ~~Nirav D. Shah, former principal deputy director of the Centers for Disease Control and Prevention (2023–2025) and 2026 gubernatorial candidate~~ (endorsement rescinded after primary)

U.S. senators

- ~~Ruben Gallego, Arizona (2025–present)~~ (endorsement rescinded after primary)
- ~~Kirsten Gillibrand, New York (2010–present)~~ (previously endorsed Mills, endorsement rescinded after primary)
- ~~Martin Heinrich, New Mexico (2013–present)~~ (endorsement rescinded after primary)
- ~~Chris Murphy, Connecticut (2013–present)~~ (endorsement rescinded after primary)
- ~~Bernie Sanders, Vermont (2007–present) (Independent)~~ (endorsement rescinded after primary)
- ~~Brian Schatz, Hawaii (2012–present)~~ (endorsement rescinded after primary)
- ~~Chuck Schumer, Senate Minority Leader (2017–2021, 2025–present) from New York (1999–present)~~ (previously endorsed Mills, endorsement rescinded after primary)
- ~~Tina Smith, Minnesota (2018–present)~~ (endorsement rescinded after primary)
- ~~Elizabeth Warren, Massachusetts (2013–present)~~ (endorsement rescinded after primary)
- ~~Sheldon Whitehouse, Rhode Island (2007–present)~~ (endorsement rescinded after primary)

U.S. representatives

- ~~Ro Khanna, CA-17 (2017–present)~~ (endorsement rescinded after primary; endorsed Jackson)

Statewide officials

- ~~Shenna Bellows, Maine secretary of state (2021–present) and 2026 gubernatorial candidate~~ (endorsement rescinded after primary)
- ~~Matthew Dunlap, Maine state auditor (2021; 2022–present), former Maine secretary of state (2005–2011; 2013–2021), and 2026 candidate for ME-02~~ (endorsement rescinded after primary)
- ~~Tim Walz, governor of Minnesota (2019–present)~~ (endorsement rescinded after primary)

State legislators

- ~~Joe Baldacci, state senator from the 9th district (2020–present) and 2026 candidate for ME-02~~ (endorsement rescinded after primary)
- ~~Troy Jackson, former president of the Maine Senate (2018–2024) from the 35th district (2008–2014) and 1st district (2016–2024) and 2026 gubernatorial candidate~~ (endorsement rescinded after primary)
- ~~Genevieve McDonald, former state representative from the 134th district (2018–2022)~~ (endorsement rescinded before primary) (Note: Resigned as campaign political director and withdrew endorsement after controversy around old Reddit comments.)
- ~~Hannah Pingree, former Speaker of the Maine House of Representatives (2008-2010) and 2026 gubernatorial candidate~~ (endorsement rescinded after primary)
- ~~Aaron Regunberg, former state representative from Rhode Island's 4th district (2015–2019)~~ (endorsement rescinded after primary; endorsed Jackson)
- Joanne Twomey, former state representative from the 19th district (1998–2004) and 135th district (2004–2006)
- 3 current state senators (Note: Pinny Beebe-Center, state senator from the 12th district (2022–present); Chip Curry, state senator from the 11th district (2020–present); Mike Tipping, state senator for the 8th district (2022–present))
- 16 current state representatives (Note: Mana Abdi, state representative from the 95th district (2022–present); Matthew Beck, state representative from the 122nd district (2024–present); Deqa Dhalac, state representative from the 120th district (2022–present); Janice Dodge, state representative from the 97th district (2018–present); Victoria Doudera, state representative from the 94th district (2018–2022) and 47th district (2022–present); Gary Friedmann, state representative from the 14th district (2024–present); Valli Geiger, state representative from the 93rd district (2020–2022) and the 42nd district (2022–present); Cheryl Golek, state representative from the 99th district (2022–present); Rafael Macias, state representative from the 51st district; Nina Milliken, state representative from the 16th district (2022–present); Karen Montell, state representative from the 54th district (2022–present); Dylan Pugh, state representative from the 114th district (2024–present); Ambureen Rana, state representative from the 21st district (2022–present); Morgan Rielly, Maine House of Representatives from the 34th district (2020–2022) and 127th district (2022–present); Ellie Sato, state representative from the 109th district (2024–present); Kilton Webb, state representative from the 98th district (2024–present))

Local officials

- Karen Heck, former mayor of Waterville (2012–2014) (Independent)
- Safiya Khalid, former Lewiston city councilor (2020–2022)
- ~~Carl Sheline, mayor of Lewiston (2022–present)~~ (switched endorsement to Shah after primary)

Party officials

- ~~David Hogg, former vice chair of the Democratic National Committee (2025)~~ (endorsement rescinded after primary)

Individuals

- Ken Casey, vocalist for the Dropkick Murphys
- John Hodgman, author
- ~~Stephen King, author~~ (switched endorsement to Jackson after convention)
- Josh Ritter, singer-songwriter
- ~~Jordan Wood, 2026 candidate for ME-02 and former candidate for this seat~~ (previously declined to endorse; endorsement rescinded after primary)

Labor unions

- ~~Maine AFL-CIO~~ (endorsement rescinded after primary; endorsed Jackson)
- ~~International Association of Machinists and Aerospace Workers~~ (switched endorsement to Jackson after convention)
- ~~International Federation of Professional and Technical Engineers~~ (switched endorsement to Jackson after convention)
- ~~Maine State Nurses Association~~ (switched endorsement to Jackson after convention)
- ~~National Nurses United~~ (endorsement rescinded after primary; endorsed Jackson)
- ~~United Auto Workers~~ (endorsement rescinded after primary; endorsed Jackson)

Organizations

- ~~Christopher Street Project~~ (endorsement rescinded after primary)
- ~~College Democrats of America~~ (endorsement rescinded after primary)
- ~~Democratic Senatorial Campaign Committee~~ (previously endorsed Mills, endorsement rescinded after primary)
- ~~End Citizens United~~ (endorsement rescinded after primary; endorsed Jackson)
- ~~Gen-Z for Change~~ (endorsement rescinded after primary; endorsed Jackson)
- ~~Maine People's Alliance~~ (endorsement rescinded after primary)
- ~~Our Revolution~~ (endorsement rescinded after primary; endorsed Jackson)
- Progressive Change Campaign Committee
- ~~Progressive Victory~~ (endorsement rescinded after primary)
- ~~Showing Up for Racial Justice~~ (endorsement rescinded after primary)
- ~~Sierra Club~~ (endorsement rescinded after primary)
- ~~Track AIPAC~~ (endorsement rescinded after primary)
- ~~Voters of Tomorrow~~ (endorsement rescinded after primary)
- ~~VoteVets~~ (endorsement rescinded after primary)

Political parties

- ~~Working Families Party~~ (endorsement rescinded after primary)
Dan Kleban (withdrawn)

State legislators

- Mattie Daughtry, president of the Maine Senate (2024–present) from the 23rd district (2020–present)

Individuals

- Lucas St. Clair, national board chair of the Trust for Public Land
Janet Mills (suspended campaign, remained on ballot)

U.S. senators

- Catherine Cortez Masto, Nevada (2017–present)
- ~~Chuck Schumer, New York (1999–present)~~ (endorsed Platner after Mills suspended her campaign)
- ~~Kirsten Gillibrand, New York (2010–present)~~ (endorsed Platner after Mills suspended her campaign)

U.S. representatives

- Barney Frank, former MA-04 (1981–2013) (deceased)

Statewide officials

- Andy Beshear, governor of Kentucky (2019–present)
- Aaron Frey, attorney general of Maine (2019–present)
- Michelle Lujan Grisham, governor of New Mexico (2019–present)
- Maura Healey, governor of Massachusetts (2023–present)
- Drew Ketterer, former attorney general of Maine (1995–2001)
- Steve Rowe, former attorney general of Maine (2001–2009)
- James E. Tierney, former attorney general of Maine (1981–1991)
- Gretchen Whitmer, governor of Michigan (2019–present)

State legislators

- Ben Allen, state senator from California's 24th district (2014–present)
- Lynn Bromley, former state senator from the 7th district (2000–2008)
- Emily Cain, former state senator from the 30th district (2012–2014)
- Margaret Craven, former state representative from the 59th district (2002–2008, 2018–2022) and 93rd district (2022–2024)
- Leila Percy, former state representative from the 64th district (2002–2010)
- Linda Sanborn, former state senator from the 30th district (2018–2020)
- Barbara Trafton, former state senator from the 12th district (1979–1982)
- Eloise Vitelli, former majority leader of the Maine Senate (2021–2024) from the 23rd district (2013–2014, 2016–2022) and 24th district (2022–2024)

Individuals

- Dan Kleban, brewery owner and former candidate for this seat
- Daira Smith-Rodriguez, former civilian contracting officer for the U.S. Air Force and former candidate for this seat

Organizations

- ~~Democratic Senatorial Campaign Committee~~ (endorsed Platner after Mills suspended her campaign)
- Elect Democratic Women
- EMILYs List
- Planned Parenthood Action Fund
- Reproductive Freedom for All
Jordan Wood (withdrawn)

U.S. representatives

- Raul Ruiz, CA-36 (2013–2023), CA-25 (2023–present)
- Katie Porter, former CA-47 (2019–2025)

Organizations

- Vote Common Good
- Patriotic Millionaires
Declined to endorse

U.S. senators

- John Fetterman, Pennsylvania (2023–present) (endorsed against Platner)
- Angus King, Maine (2013–present) (Independent)

U.S. representatives

- Jake Auchincloss, MA-04 (2021–present) (endorsed against Platner)
- Madeleine Dean, PA-04 (2019–present) (endorsed against Platner)
- Jared Golden, ME-02 (2019–present)
- Seth Moulton, MA-06 (2015–present) and 2026 Massachusetts Senate candidate

Statewide officials

- Janet Mills, governor of Maine (2019–present) and former candidate for this seat

Individuals

- ~~Jordan Wood, candidate for ME-02 in 2026 and former candidate for this seat~~ (endorsed Platner after Mills suspended her campaign)

=== Fundraising ===
Italics indicate a withdrawn candidate

Campaign finance reports as of May 20, 2026
Candidate	Raised	Spent	Cash on hand
David Costello (D)	$149,655	$107,868	$41,787
David Evans (D) (Note: Withdrawn candidate)	$6,437	$6,437	$0
Tucker Favreau (D)	$13,599	$4,913	$5,170
Dan Kleban (D)	$458,787	$458,367	$420
Andrea LaFlamme (D)	$7,739	$1,929	$5,810
Janet Mills (D) (Note: Campaign suspended)	$5,838,277	$5,121,375	$716,903
Graham Platner (D)	$16,312,222	$14,131,391	$2,180,832
Daira Smith-Rodriguez (D)	$242,582	$242,582	$0
Jordan Wood (D)	$3,098,912	$2,178,443	$920,470
Source: Federal Election Commission

=== Polling ===
Aggregate polls

Source of poll aggregation	Dates administered	Dates updated	Janet Mills	Graham Platner	Other/Undecided (Note: Calculated by taking the difference of 100% and all other candidates combined.)	Margin
270toWin	May 21 – June 5, 2026	June 8, 2026	13.0%	72.0%	15.0% (Note: David Costello with 4%; Andrea LaFlamme with 2%)	Platner +59.0%
Decision Desk HQ	through June 5, 2026	June 9, 2026	19.5%	65.8%	14.7%	Platner +46.3%
Race to the WH	through May 25, 2026	May 27, 2026	11.9%	74.4%	13.7% (Note: David Costello with 2.9%; Andrea LaFlamme with 1.6%)	Platner +62.5%
Average			14.8%	70.7%	14.5%	Platner +55.9%

Poll source	Date(s) administered	Sample size	Margin of error	David Costello	Janet Mills	Graham Platner	Jordan Wood	Other	Undecided
Tavern Research (D)	June 5, 2026	704 (LV)	± 5.9%	5%	16%	68%	—	2% (Note: LaFlamme with 2%)	9%
Tavern Research (D)	June 5, 2026	704 (LV)	± 5.9%	—	31%	69%	—	—	—
Tavern Research (D)	June 5, 2026	704 (LV)	± 5.9%	—	—	72%	—	28% (Note: "Another Democrat candidate" with 28%)	—
University of New Hampshire	May 21–25, 2026	595 (LV)	± 4.0%	3%	10%	76%	—	2% (Note: "Another candidate" with 2%)	8%
	April 30, 2026	Mills suspends her campaign, remains on ballot							
Workbench Strategy (D) (Note: Poll sponsored by Platner's campaign.)	April 6–9, 2026	600 (LV)	—	—	29%	64%	—	—	7%
Maine People's Resource Center (D) (Note: Pollster affiliated with the Maine People's Alliance, which has endorsed Platner's campaign.)	March 20–31, 2026	514 (LV)	—	2%	28%	61%	—	—	9%
Emerson College	March 21–23, 2026	530 (LV)	± 4.2%	1%	28%	55%	—	4% (Note: LaFlamme and "Someone else" with 2%)	13%
Impact Research (D) (Note: Poll commissioned by gubernatorial candidate Troy Jackson, who has endorsed Platner's campaign.)	March 19–23, 2026	500 (LV)	—	—	28%	66%	—	—	6%
Quantus Insights (R)	March 5, 2026	450 (LV)	± 3.4%	—	38%	43%	—	—	19%
Pan Atlantic Research	February 13 – March 2, 2026	367 (LV)	—	4%	39%	46%	—	—	11%
University of New Hampshire	February 12–16, 2026	462 (LV)	± 4.5%	1%	26%	64%	—	3% (Note: LaFlamme with 2%; "Another candidate" with 1%; Evans and Favreau with 0%)	6%
	January 31, 2026	Favreau withdraws							
Workbench Strategy (D)	December 11–16, 2025	500 (LV)	—	—	40%	55%	—	—	5%
Pan Atlantic Research	November 29 – December 7, 2025	318 (LV)	—	1%	47%	37%	—	—	14%
Z to A Research (D) (Note: Poll sponsored by the Progressive Change Campaign Committee, which has endorsed Platner's campaign.)	November 14–18, 2025	845 (LV)	± 3.0%	0%	38%	58%	—	2% (Note: Evans and LaFlamme with 1%; Favreau with 0%)	2%
	November 12, 2025	Wood withdraws							
Maine People's Resource Center (D)	October 26–29, 2025	783 (V)	± 3.5%	—	39%	41%	5%	—	14%
Maine People's Resource Center (D)	October 26–29, 2025	783 (V)	± 3.5%	—	47% (Note: With undecided and Wood votes re-allocated based on second-choice preference)	53%	—	—	—
SoCal Strategies	October 21–25, 2025	500 (LV)	± 4.4%	1%	41%	36%	2%	—	20%
NRSC (R)	October 22–23, 2025	647 (LV)	± 3.5%	—	25%	46%	3%	—	26%
University of New Hampshire	October 16–21, 2025	510 (LV)	± 4.3%	1%	24%	58%	1%	1% (Note: "Write in someone else" with 1%; Evans, Favreau, and LaFlamme with 0%)	14%

=== Results ===
County results Platner: 60–70%; 70–80%; 80–90%

Congressional district results Platner: 70–80%

Democratic primary results
Party	Candidate	Votes	%
Democratic	Graham Platner	156,084	72.1
Democratic	Janet Mills (withdrawn)	41,644	19.3
Democratic	David Costello	17,560	8.1
Democratic	Andrea LaFlamme (write-in)	1,114	0.5
Total votes		216,402	100.0

=== Platner's withdrawal ===
On July 6, 2026, a woman Platner had previously dated accused him of raping her while he was drunk nearly five years prior. Platner denied the accusation, accusing it of being a political attack to derail his campaign. The next day, another former girlfriend alleged that he would take condoms off during sex without her consent. Shortly after the rape allegation, U.S. Senator Ruben Gallego and U.S. Representative Ro Khanna rescinded their endorsements of Platner, and the Maine Democratic Party released a statement calling on Platner to suspend his campaign. Platner later stated on the same day that the campaign would "tak[e] the time to reflect on the best path forward", fueling speculation that he would withdraw from the race. Soon, numerous organizations and U.S. senators, including those who had endorsed Platner, called on him to exit the race. Senate Democratic Leader Chuck Schumer and Democratic Senatorial Campaign Committee chair Kirsten Gillibrand, who also rescinded their endorsements, stated that the DSCC would not invest in the race as long as Platner remained on the ballot. On July 8, Platner announced that he would drop out of the race, filing his withdrawal two days later.

== Democratic nominating convention ==
=== Process ===
No political party in Maine had replaced their nominee in any prior election. While the exact process to be used was not immediately certain, Maine Democratic Party officials and others like Maine Senate president Mattie Daughtry called for an open and inclusive process. On July 8, the Maine Democratic Party voted to hold a state party convention to nominate a candidate to replace Platner as the Democratic nominee. The convention was held on July 25 in Bangor. In order to qualify for the convention, replacement candidates had until July 15 to declare their intent to run; they also had until July 21 to collect at least 500 signatures, with at least 50 signatures from eight different counties. The convention consisted of 601 delegates overall, including the party's state committee. 500 of the delegates were elected via county-level caucuses held on July 18–19. All delegates at the convention were officially unpledged, though candidates published slates of committed supporters before the county meetings.

=== Campaign and convention ===
Leading up to and following Platner's withdrawal, former gubernatorial candidates Nirav Shah, Troy Jackson, and Shenna Bellows were viewed as likely frontrunners for the replacement nomination. Jackson was the first to declare his candidacy for the Senate nomination, while Shah was the first candidate to receive sufficient signatures to qualify. Following the county meetings, at least 456 of the selected delegates were pledged supporters of Jackson, (Note: There is inconsistency between reports of the exact number of delegates that pledged for Jackson. The Bangor Daily News, in their breakdown of county meeting results, reported 456 Jackson delegates. Maine Morning Star reported 478 Jackson delegates. Jackson's campaign gave a figure of 481 delegates.) placing him in the lead for the nomination. Bellows and Shah, along with candidates Dan Kleban and Jordan Wood, all withdrew from the race on July 19. Jackson and healthcare executive Saundra Pelletier were the only candidates to qualify for the convention ballot and continue their campaigns after the county caucuses. Jackson won the convention vote over Pelletier, 566–5.

=== Candidates ===
==== Nominee ====
- Troy Jackson, former president of the Maine Senate (2018–2024), candidate for ME-02 in 2014, and candidate for governor in 2026

==== Eliminated at convention ====
- Saundra Pelletier, healthcare executive

==== Failed to qualify ====
- Elizabeth Cote, health policy executive
- Joseph Leveille, Marine Corps veteran
- Ashley Webb, author, musician, and transgender activist

==== Withdrawn ====
- Shenna Bellows, Maine secretary of state (2021–present), nominee for U.S. Senate in 2014, and candidate for governor in 2026
- David Costello, former deputy secretary of the Maryland Department of the Environment, nominee for U.S. Senate in 2024, and primary candidate for this seat (endorsed Jackson)
- Elizabeth Dickerson, former state representative from the 93rd district (2012–2015)
- Dan Kleban, brewery owner and former primary candidate for this seat (endorsed Jackson)
- Andrea LaFlamme, adjunct professor at the University of Maine and primary candidate for this seat
- Kristina Libby, writer, actor, and organizer
- Paige Loud, social worker and candidate for ME-02 in 2026
- Nirav Shah, former principal deputy director of the Centers for Disease Control and Prevention (2023–2025), former director of the Maine CDC (2019–2023), and candidate for governor in 2026 (endorsed Jackson)
- Jordan Wood, former chief of staff to former U.S. representative Katie Porter, former primary candidate for this seat, and candidate for ME-02 in 2026 (endorsed Jackson)

==== Declined ====
- Joe Baldacci, state senator from the 9th district (2020–present) and candidate for ME-02 in 2026
- Mattie Daughtry, president of the Maine Senate (2024–present)
- Patrick Dempsey, actor
- Valli Geiger, state representative from the 93rd district (2020–2022) and 42nd district (2022–present) (endorsed Bellows)
- Jared Golden, U.S. representative from ME-02 (2019–present)
- Heather Cox Richardson, historian

=== Endorsements ===
Troy Jackson

U.S. representatives

- Ro Khanna, CA-17 (2017–present)

Statewide officials

- Nirav Shah, former principal deputy director of the Centers for Disease Control and Prevention (2023–2025), former director of the Maine CDC (2019–2023), and former convention candidate for this seat

State legislators

- Ryan Fecteau, speaker of the Maine House of Representatives (2020–2022, 2024–present) from the 132nd district (2014–2022, 2024–present)
- Aaron Regunberg, former state representative from Rhode Island's 4th district (2015–2019)

Individuals

- David Costello, former deputy secretary of the Maryland Department of the Environment, nominee for U.S. Senate in 2024, and primary candidate for this seat
- Dan Kleban, brewery owner and former candidate for this seat
- Hasan Piker, political commentator
- Jordan Wood, former chief of staff to former U.S. representative Katie Porter and former candidate for this seat

Labor unions

- Maine AFL-CIO
- Maine State Nurses Association
- United Auto Workers

Organizations

- Alliance for Retired Americans
- Gen-Z for Change
- Our Revolution
- Sunrise Movement
Shenna Bellows (withdrawn)

State legislators

- Valli Geiger, state representative (2020–present)

Organizations

- Center for Biological Diversity
- Friends of the Earth
Nirav Shah (withdrawn)

Local officials

- Carl Sheline, mayor of Lewiston (2022–present)
Declined to endorse

U.S. senators

- Tammy Duckworth, Illinois (2017–present) (endorsed against Shah)
- Dick Durbin, Illinois (1997–present) (endorsed against Shah)
- Martin Heinrich, New Mexico (2013–present)
- Bernie Sanders, Vermont (2007–present)
- Chuck Schumer, senate minority leader (2017–2021, 2025–present) from New York (1999–present)
- Elizabeth Warren, Massachusetts (2013–present)
- Sheldon Whitehouse, Rhode Island (2007–present)

Statewide officials

- Janet Mills, governor of Maine (2019–present) and former primary candidate for this seat

=== Debates ===
A debate featuring eight of the declared candidates, hosted by News Center Maine, occurred on July 16, 2026. A second debate, hosted by the Bangor Daily News and CNN, was scheduled for July 23, but was later cancelled.

Democratic nominating convention debates
No.	Date	Hosts	Moderators	Link	Participants								
Key: P Participant W Withdrawn													
Key: P Participant W Withdrawn					Bellows	Costello	Dickerson	Jackson	Kleban	Loud	Shah	Webb	Wood
1	July 16, 2026	News Center Maine	Rob Caldwell; Phil Hirschkorn		P	P	P	P	P	W	P	P	P

=== Fundraising ===
Campaign finance reports as of September 30, 2026
Candidate	Raised	Spent	Cash on hand
Shenna Bellows	$381,370	$381,235	$135
Nirav Shah	$280,756	$280,756	$0.00
Saundra Pelletier	$426,560	$426,560	$0.00
Source: Federal Election Commission

=== Polling ===
Poll source	Date(s) administered	Sample size	Margin of error	Shenna Bellows	David Costello	Troy Jackson	Dan Kleban	Paige Loud	Nirav Shah	Jordan Wood	Other	Undecided
University of New Hampshire	July 15–20, 2026	538 (LV)	± 4.3%	11%	0%	51%	1%	1%	26%	1%	3% (Note: "Another candidate" with 3%; Ashley Webb with 0%)	5%
Blueprint Polling (D)	July 9–10, 2026	884 (LV)	± 3.1%	14%	0%	40%	1%	1%	23%	3%	8% (Note: "Someone else" with 7%; Valli Geiger with 1%)	10%

=== Results ===
Pledged delegates by candidate prior to convention (Note: The convention consisted of 601 delegates, including 101 members of the Maine Democratic State Committee; this table features only the 500 delegates elected in county caucuses. Figures are given per reporting by the Bangor Daily News.)
Candidate	Delegates
Troy Jackson	456
Uncommitted	34
Nirav Shah (withdrawn)	6
Shenna Bellows (withdrawn)	2
Jordan Wood (withdrawn)	2

County caucus results Jackson: 40–50%; 60–70%; 70–80%; 80–90%; 90–100%; Uncommitted: 50%

Pledged delegates by county prior to convention
County	Troy Jackson	Uncommitted	Nirav Shah (withdrawn)	Shenna Bellows (withdrawn)	Jordan Wood (withdrawn)
Androscoggin	24	7	0	0	0
Aroostook	15	0	0	0	0
Cumberland	148	1	0	0	0
Franklin	6	2	0	0	1
Hancock	22	1	0	0	0
Kennebec	36	4	0	0	0
Knox	18	0	0	0	0
Lincoln	7	3	3	1	1
Oxford	13	3	1	0	0
Penobscot	44	0	0	0	0
Piscataquis	3	1	0	0	0
Sagadahoc	16	0	0	0	0
Somerset	11	1	0	0	0
Waldo	14	1	0	0	0
Washington	1	4	2	1	0
York	78	6	0	0	0

Democratic convention results
Party	Candidate	Votes	%
Democratic	Troy Jackson	566	99.1
Democratic	Saundra Pelletier	5	0.9
Total votes		571	100.0

== Independents ==
=== Candidates ===
==== Did not qualify ====
- Tim Rich, former restaurant owner

==== Withdrawn ====
- Phillip Rench, former member of the Maine Space Corporation Board of Directors (2023–2025)

=== Fundraising ===
Italics indicate a withdrawn candidate

Campaign finance reports as of September 30, 2025
Candidate	Raised	Spent	Cash on hand
Phillip Rench (I)	$55,313	$31,072	$24,241
Source: Federal Election Commission

== General election ==
Senate control, abortion rights, data centers, health care, ICE, and cost-of-living were concerns of voters. Collins' AI policy has "generally walked a fine line on data centers", while Jackson has been "highly critical of data center developers and has called for the state to implement a moratorium on their construction". Jackson ran on a pro-choice platform, criticizing Collins for her vote to approve Brett Kavanaugh to the Supreme Court. Both attempted to tie the cost-of-living to one another's policies. Jackson criticized ICE, and the killings of Alex Pretti, Renée Good, and Johan Guerrero.

In October, a Super PAC spent $25,000 supporting Collins in ads in Portland, Oregon. Jackson focused on control of the Senate, saying during the first debate that Collins had voted with Republicans and Trump "nearly 96% of the time". Jackson also said that a vote for Collins is a vote for a Republican Senate majority leader that would support Trump's policies. Collins said that she has shown independence from the national Republican Party. In September, a report from ProPublica alleged that Collins had been at the center of a pay-to-play scheme involving Martin Kao, the imprisoned former CEO of defense contractor Navatek. Collins strongly denied any allegations of wrongdoing.

The Verge said that AI development and AI data centers have been the "deciding" issue in the campaign, with "many Maine voters, especially independents, conflicted about data center investment in the state." Maine's low-population density, low cost land, and water access have made it a center for data center construction. Major technology companies and private equity firms "invested millions in the midterms to win over skeptical locals" and to support Collins. Jackson flipped five counties that had backed Collins in 2020: York, Sagadahoc, Lincoln, Waldo, and Hancock. Though Collins performed better than Trump and Republican gubernatorial nominee Bobby Charles, Jackson won the race, with Collins calling Jackson to concede shortly after midnight.

=== Predictions ===
Source	Ranking	As of
ABC News	Tossup	November 3, 2026
CBS News	Tossup	October 30, 2026
The Cook Political Report	Tossup	November 2, 2026
Decision Desk HQ	Lean D (flip)	November 3, 2026
The Economist (Note: The Economist's prediction model uses unconventional terminology. For the purpose of equivalency, their "Very Likely" ratings are formatted as a "Likely" rating while "Likely" ratings are formatted as a "Lean" rating.)	Lean D (flip)	November 3, 2026
FiftyPlusOne	Likely D (flip)	November 3, 2026
Fox News	Tossup	November 1, 2026
Inside Elections	Tossup	October 29, 2026
MS NOW	Tossup	October 29, 2026
NBC News	Lean D (flip)	November 3, 2026
RealClearPolitics	Tossup	November 2, 2026
Sabato's Crystal Ball	Lean D (flip)	November 2, 2026
Silver Bulletin	Likely D (flip)	November 3, 2026
Split Ticket	Lean D (flip)	November 2, 2026

=== Post-primary endorsements ===
Susan Collins (R)

Executive branch officials

- George W. Bush, former president of the United States (2001–2009)
- Jeff Flake, former ambassador to Turkey (2022–2024) and U.S. senator from Arizona (2013–2019)
- Nikki Haley, former ambassador to the United Nations (2017–2018) and governor of South Carolina (2011–2017)
- Donald Trump, president of the United States (2017–2021, 2025–present)

U.S. senators

- John Cornyn, Texas (2002–present)
- Joe Manchin, former West Virginia (2010–2025) (Independent; Democratic until 2024)

State legislators

- Cynthia Dill, former member of the Maine House of Representatives (2006–2011) and Maine Senate (2011–2012), and Democratic nominee for U.S. Senate in 2012 (Independent; Democratic until 2026)

Tribal governments

- Passamaquoddy Tribe at Sipayik

Organizations

- National Federation of Independent Business
Troy Jackson (D)

Executive branch officials

- Kamala Harris, former vice president of the United States (2021–2025)
- Barack Obama, former president of the United States (2009–2017)
- W. Robert Pearson, former Director General of the Foreign Service (2003–2006)
- Thomas R. Pickering, former ambassador to the United Nations (1989–1992)
- Susan Rice, former ambassador to the United Nations (2009–2013)
- Wendy Sherman former deputy Secretary of State (2014–2015, 2021–2023)

U.S. senators

- Mark Kelly, Arizona (2020–present)
- Ed Markey, Massachusetts (2013–present)
- Bernie Sanders, Vermont (2007–present) (Independent)
- Elizabeth Warren, Massachusetts (2013–present)

U.S. representatives

- Alexandria Ocasio-Cortez, NY‑14 (2019–present)
- Chellie Pingree, ME-01 (2009–present)

Statewide officials

- Janet Mills, governor of Maine (2019–present) and former primary candidate for this seat

State legislators

- Cathy Breen, state senator for the 25th district (2014–2022)
- Mattie Daughtry, President of the Maine Senate (2024–present)
- Rebecca Millett, state senator for the 7th (2012–2014) and 29th (2014–2020) districts; state representative for the 30th (2020–2022) and 123rd (2022–2024) districts

Individuals

- Ken Casey, lead vocalist of Dropkick Murphys
- Stephen King, author
- Ms. Rachel, children's educator and activist
- Heather Cox Richardson, historian
- Liz Shuler, president of the AFL-CIO

Tribal governments

- Houlton Band of Maliseets

Labor unions

- International Association of Machinists and Aerospace Workers
- International Federation of Professional and Technical Engineers
- Maine Education Association
- Maine Service Employees Association (previously endorsed Platner)
- Maine State Nurses Association
- National Nurses United

Organizations

- Human Rights Campaign
- J Street
- Maine Women's Lobby
- Planned Parenthood Action Fund (previously endorsed Platner)
- Progressive Victory
- Reproductive Freedom for All
- Sierra Club

Political parties

- Working Families Party
Graham Platner (D) (withdrawn)

U.S. senators

- ~~Ed Markey, Massachusetts (2013–present)~~ (endorsement rescinded)

Individuals

- Bill Maher, TV host and comedian (Independent)

Labor unions

- ~~Maine Service Employees Association~~ (endorsement rescinded; endorsed Jackson)

Organizations

- ~~Planned Parenthood Action Fund~~ (endorsement rescinded; endorsed Jackson)
Declined to endorse

Executive branch officials

- Hillary Clinton, former secretary of state (2009–2013) (Democratic; declined to endorse Platner)

U.S. senators

- Catherine Cortez Masto, Nevada (2017–present) (Democratic; declined to endorse Platner)
- Tammy Duckworth, Illinois (2017–present) (Democratic; declined to endorse Platner)
- John Fetterman, Pennsylvania (2023–present) (Democratic; declined to endorse Platner)
- ~~Mark Kelly, Arizona (2020–present)~~ (Democratic; endorsed Jackson)
- Raphael Warnock, Georgia (2021–present) (Democratic; declined to endorse Platner)

Statewide officials

- ~~Janet Mills, governor of Maine (2019–present) and former primary candidate for this seat~~ (Democratic; endorsed Jackson)

Individuals

- Dan Osborn, former union leader and 2026 U.S. Senate candidate in Nebraska (Independent; declined to endorse Platner)

=== Debates ===
2026 Maine U.S. Senate election debates
No.	Date	Host	Moderator	Link	Republican	Democratic
Key: P Participant A Absent N Not invited I Invited W Withdrawn						
Key: P Participant A Absent N Not invited I Invited W Withdrawn					Collins	Jackson
1	October 6, 2026	WGME	Gregg Lagerquist	YouTube	P	P
2	October 8, 2026	WMTW	Jon Chrisos	YouTube	P	P
3	October 13, 2026	WABI; WAGM	Jon Small; Kathy O'Mara	YouTube	P	P
4	October 15, 2026	News Center Maine; Portland Press Herald; Maine Public	Phil Hershkorn; Steve Mistler	YouTube	P	P

=== Fundraising ===
Campaign finance reports as of October 14, 2026
Candidate	Raised	Spent	Cash on hand
Susan Collins (R)	$25,225,468	$23,830,778	$2,689,883
Troy Jackson (D)	$26,872,874	$25,276,003	$1,596,871
Source: Federal Election Commission

=== Polling ===
Aggregate polls

Source of poll aggregation	Dates administered	Dates updated	Susan Collins (R)	Troy Jackson (D)	Other/Undecided	Margin
270toWin	October 16 – November 1, 2026	November 3, 2026	45.9%	50.9%	3.2%	Jackson +5.0%
Decision Desk HQ	through November 1, 2026	November 3, 2026	45.9%	51.2%	2.9%	Jackson +5.3%
FiftyPlusOne	through November 1, 2026	November 3, 2026	46.1%	50.8%	3.1%	Jackson +4.7%
RealClearPolitics	October 16 – November 1, 2026	November 2, 2026	46.6%	50.2%	3.2%	Jackson +3.6%
Silver Bulletin	through November 2, 2026	November 3, 2026	46.5%	50.5%	3.0%	Jackson +4.0%
Average			46.2%	50.7%	3.1%	Jackson +4.5%

Poll source	Date(s) administered	Sample size	Margin of error	Susan Collins (R)	Troy Jackson (D)	Other	Undecided
Rasmussen Reports (R)	October 27 – November 2, 2026	896 (LV)	± 3.0%	46%	49%	—	5%
Emerson College (Note: Poll sponsored by Poll Vault, a Substack newsletter authored by Sean Trende.)	October 31 – November 1, 2026	600 (LV)	± 4.0%	51%	49%	—	—
AtlasIntel	October 28 – November 1, 2026	967 (LV)	± 3.0%	44%	53%	2% (Note: "Would not vote" with 2%)	1%
Survey 160	October 27 – November 1, 2026	1,323 (LV)	± 4.1%	47% (Note: With voters who lean toward a given candidate)	50%	2%	2%
Survey 160	October 27 – November 1, 2026	1,323 (LV)	± 4.1%	46%	50%	1%	3%
Survey 160	October 27 – November 1, 2026	1,335 (RV)	± 4.1%	47%	49%	2%	2%
Survey 160	October 27 – November 1, 2026	1,335 (RV)	± 4.1%	46%	49%	2%	4%
New York Times/Siena University	October 27 – November 1, 2026	714 (LV)	± 4.7%	45%	51%	0%	4%
University of New Hampshire	October 27–31, 2026	1,654 (LV)	± 2.4%	45%	54%	0%	0%
YouGov	October 26–29, 2026	1,503 (LV)	± 4.0%	47%	52%	0%	0%
Data for Progress (D)	October 23–27, 2026	652 (LV)	± 4.5%	45%	50%	—	4%
SSRS (Note: Poll conducted for CNN)	October 20–26, 2026	783 (LV)	± 4.5%	45%	49%	6% (Note: "Neither" with 4%)	0%
Marist University	October 22–25, 2026	— (LV)	± 6.6%	47%	49%	1%	3%
Marist University	October 22–25, 2026	1,449 (RV)	± 4.1%	44%	53%	<1%	2%
Trafalgar Group (R)	October 21–23, 2026	1,077 (LV)	± 2.9%	47%	47%	—	7%
Echelon Insights (R)	October 16–23, 2026	413 (LV)	± 6.3%	44%	51%	1%	4%
Beacon Research (D)/ Shaw & Co. Research (R) (Note: Poll conducted for Fox News)	October 16–20, 2026	1,514 (LV)	± 2.5%	49%	49%	1%	1%
Beacon Research (D)/ Shaw & Co. Research (R)	October 16–20, 2026	1,689 (RV)	± 2%	48%	50%	1%	2%
InsiderAdvantage (R)	October 13–14, 2026	1,200 (LV)	± 2.8%	47%	49%	—	4%
Suffolk University	October 8–11, 2026	500 (LV)	± 4.4%	47%	49%	—	4%
Rasmussen Reports (R)	October 5–8, 2026	804 (LV)	± 3.0%	47%	49%	—	4%
The Washington Post/SSPG	September 30 – October 5, 2026	800 (LV)	± 3.6%	46%	50%	1% (Note: "Someone else" with 1%)	3%
Marist University	October 1–4, 2026	1,505 (RV)	± 3.8%	47%	51%	1% (Note: "Another candidate" with 1%)	1%
Trafalgar Group (R)	September 29 – October 1, 2026	1,091 (LV)	± 2.9%	46%	46%	—	8%
CBS News/YouGov	September 23 – October 1, 2026	1,136 (LV)	± 4.7%	50%	50%	—	—
co/efficient (R)	September 28–30, 2026	1,240 (LV)	± 2.8%	48%	46%	—	6%
Maine People's Resource Center	September 25–29, 2026	684 (LV)	± 3.8%	47%	49%	—	4%
InsiderAdvantage (R)	September 22–23, 2026	1,200 (LV)	± 2.8%	46%	46%	3% (Note: "Another candidate" with 3%)	5%
Fabrizio Ward (R)/ Impact Research (D) (Note: Poll commissioned by AARP)	September 20–22, 2026	982 (LV)	± 3.1%	47%	50%	1%	3%
New York Times/Siena University	September 15–22, 2026	619 (LV)	± 4.9%	49%	46%	—	5%
University of New Hampshire	September 17–21, 2026	1,312 (LV)	± 2.7%	47%	51%	1% (Note: "Another candidate" with 1%)	1%
Quantus Insights (R)	September 14–15, 2026	621 (LV)	± 4.3%	48%	47%	2% (Note: "Someone else" with 2%)	4%
Quantus Insights (R)	September 14–15, 2026	621 (LV)	± 4.3%	47%	46%	2%	5%
University of Massachusetts/YouGov	August 28 – September 14, 2026	650 (LV)	± 4.7%	43%	48%	—	9%
Rasmussen Reports (R)	September 8–10, 2026	1,033 (LV)	± 3.0%	45%	46%	—	9%
YouGov	September 2–8, 2026	1,335 (LV)	± 4.9%	44%	48%	1% (Note: "Someone else" with 1%)	6%
YouGov	September 2–8, 2026	1,378 (RV)	± 4.9%	44%	46%	1%	9%
SSRS (Note: Poll conducted for CNN)	August 31 – September 6, 2026	880 (LV)	± 3.7%	45%	48%	7% (Note: "Neither" with 4%)	—
Abacus Data	August 26–28, 2026	327 (LV)	—	43%	52%	4% (Note: "Another candidate" with 4%)	—
Abacus Data	August 26–28, 2026	500 (RV)	± 4.4%	46%	45%	9% (Note: "Another candidate" with 9%)	—
Beacon Research (D)/ Shaw & Co. Research (R) (Note: Poll conducted for Fox News)	August 6–10, 2026	1,000 (RV)	± 3.0%	46%	48%	1%	5%
Hart Research (D) (Note: Poll sponsored by Senate Majority PAC, which is focused on electing Democrats to the U.S. Senate)	July 27 – August 1, 2026	802 (LV)	± 3.5%	45%	49%	—	6%
	July 25, 2026	Jackson becomes Democratic nominee					
University of New Hampshire	July 15–20, 2026	1,178 (LV)	± 2.9%	46%	49%	2% (Note: "Another candidate" with 2%)	3%
	July 8–10, 2026	Platner withdraws					
Z to A Research (D) (Note: Poll commissioned by a pro-Shah group)	July 7–8, 2026	988 (LV)	± 3.1%	48%	47%	—	5%
Public Policy Polling (D) (Note: Poll sponsored by Platner's campaign.)	July 7, 2026	785 (LV)	—	44%	49%	—	7%

Hypothetical polling

Susan Collins vs. Shenna Bellows

Poll source	Date(s) administered	Sample size	Margin of error	Susan Collins (R)	Shenna Bellows (D)	Undecided
Z to A Research (D)	July 7–8, 2026	988 (LV)	± 3.1%	47%	47%	6%
Public Policy Polling (D)	July 7, 2026	785 (LV)	—	47%	47%	6%

Susan Collins vs. Graham Platner

Poll source	Date(s) administered	Sample size	Margin of error	Susan Collins (R)	Graham Platner (D)	Other	Undecided
	July 8, 2026	Platner suspends his campaign					
Public Policy Polling (D)	July 7, 2026	785 (LV)	—	47%	42%	—	11%
	July 6, 2026	Platner sexual assault allegation reported					
Tavern Research (D)	July 3–6, 2026	1,074 (LV)	± 3.4%	48%	52%	—	—
Beacon Research (D)/Shaw & Co. Research (R)	June 23–27, 2026	1,003 (RV)	± 3.0%	50%	47%	—	3%
The New York Times/Portland Press Herald/Siena University	June 19–26, 2026	608 (LV)	± 4.8%	47%	49%	—	4%
Wick (R)/2WAY	June 11–14, 2026	1,008 (LV)	± 3.1%	45%	48%	—	7%
Quantus Insights (R)	June 9–11, 2026	870 (LV)	± 3.4%	45%	46%	2%	7%
The Public Sentiment Institute	June 8, 2026	497 (LV)	± 4.9%	44%	43%	—	13%
Tavern Research (D)	June 5–8, 2026	1,642 (LV)	± 2.8%	49%	51%	—	—
Public Policy Polling (D)	June 2–3, 2026	670 (RV)	± 3.8%	45%	49%	—	6%
Fabrizio, Lee & Associates (R) (Note: Poll sponsored by Pine Tree Results, a Collins-aligned Super PAC.)	June 1–3, 2026	800 (LV)	± 3.5%	46%	46%	—	8%
UMass Lowell/YouGov	May 13–26, 2026	650 (LV)	± 4.9%	43%	48%	1% (Note: "Would not vote" with 1%)	6%
University of New Hampshire	May 21–25, 2026	1,280 (LV)	± 2.7%	42%	51%	2%	8%
Pan Atlantic Research	May 8–18, 2026	827 (LV)	± 3.7%	41%	48%	—	11%
Echelon Insights (R) (Note: Poll commissioned by NetChoice)	April 3–9, 2026	378 (LV)	± 6.3%	45%	51%	—	6%
Maine People's Resource Center (D)	March 20–31, 2026	1,167 (LV)	± 2.9%	39%	48%	—	13%
Emerson College	March 21–23, 2026	1,075 (LV)	± 2.9%	41%	48%	6% (Note: "Someone else" with 6%)	6%
OnMessage Public Strategies (R) (Note: Poll sponsored by the Insurance Watchdog Coalition.)	March 3–8, 2026	600 (LV)	± 4.0%	42%	44%	—	14%
Quantus Insights (R)	March 5, 2026	800 (LV)	± 3.4%	42%	49%	4% (Note: "Someone else / Third party" with 3%; "Would not vote" with 1%)	6%
Pan Atlantic Research	February 13 – March 2, 2026	810 (LV)	± 3.7%	40%	44%	—	16%
University of New Hampshire	February 12–16, 2026	1,105 (LV)	± 2.9%	38%	49%	4% (Note: "Another candidate" with 4%)	9%
Fabrizio, Lee & Associates (R)	January 20–24, 2026	800 (LV)	± 3.5%	45%	44%	—	11%
Workbench Strategy (D)	December 11–16, 2025	900 (LV)	±4.4%	50%	50%	—	—
Pan Atlantic Research	November 29 – December 7, 2025	820 (LV)	± 3.7%	42%	43%	—	15%
Maine People's Resource Center	October 26–29, 2025	783 (LV)	± 3.5%	41%	45%	—	14%
Zenith Research (D) (Note: Poll sponsored by More Perfect Union, a progressive non-profit news media organization.)	October 7–10, 2025	501 (LV)	± 4.4%	38%	38%	10% (Note: "Another candidate" with 9%; "Would not vote" with 1%)	15%

Susan Collins vs. generic Democrat

Poll source	Date(s) administered	Sample size	Margin of error	Susan Collins (R)	Generic Democrat	Undecided
Tavern Research (D)	June 5–8, 2026	1,642 (LV)	± 2.8%	45%	55%	—
Cygnal (R)	November 10–11, 2025	600 (LV)	± 4.0%	41%	49%	11%

Susan Collins vs. Dan Kleban

Poll source	Date(s) administered	Sample size	Margin of error	Susan Collins (R)	Dan Kleban (D)	Undecided
Public Policy Polling (D) (Note: Poll sponsored by Kleban's campaign.)	September 8–9, 2025	642 (RV)	—	35%	44%	21%

Susan Collins vs. Janet Mills

Poll source	Date(s) administered	Sample size	Margin of error	Susan Collins (R)	Janet Mills (D)	Other	Undecided
Public Policy Polling (D)	July 7, 2026	785 (LV)	—	48%	37%	—	15%
Tavern Research (D)	June 5–8, 2026	1,642 (LV)	± 2.8%	48%	52%	—	—
	April 30, 2026	Mills suspends her campaign					
Echelon Insights (R)	April 3–9, 2026	378 (LV)	± 6.3%	46%	48%	—	6%
Maine People's Resource Center (D)	March 20–31, 2026	1,167 (LV)	± 2.9%	45%	42%	—	9%
Emerson College	March 21–23, 2026	1,075 (LV)	± 2.9%	43%	46%	8% (Note: "Someone else" with 8%)	3%
OnMessage Public Strategies (R)	March 3–8, 2026	600 (LV)	± 4.0%	42%	42%	—	16%
Quantus Insights (R)	March 5, 2026	800 (LV)	± 3.4%	45%	43%	7% (Note: "Someone else / Third party" with 6%; "Would not vote" with 1%)	6%
Pan Atlantic Research	February 13 – March 2, 2026	810 (LV)	± 3.7%	44%	44%	—	12%
University of New Hampshire	February 12–16, 2026	1,105 (LV)	± 2.9%	40%	41%	9% (Note: "Another candidate" with 9%)	10%
Fabrizio, Lee & Associates (R)	January 20–24, 2026	800 (LV)	± 3.5%	45%	44%	—	11%
Workbench Strategy (D)	December 11–16, 2025	900 (LV)	±4.4%	51%	49%	—	—
Pan Atlantic Research	November 29 – December 7, 2025	820 (LV)	± 3.7%	43%	43%	—	14%
Maine People's Resource Center	October 26–29, 2025	783 (LV)	± 3.5%	46%	42%	—	14%
Zenith Research (D)	October 7–10, 2025	501 (LV)	± 4.4%	37%	42%	10%	12%

Susan Collins vs. Nirav Shah

Poll source	Date(s) administered	Sample size	Margin of error	Susan Collins (R)	Nirav Shah (D)	Undecided
Z to A Research (D)	July 7–8, 2026	988 (LV)	± 3.1%	46%	47%	5%
Public Policy Polling (D)	July 7, 2026	785 (LV)	—	45%	45%	10%

Susan Collins vs. Jordan Wood

Poll source	Date(s) administered	Sample size	Margin of error	Susan Collins (R)	Jordan Wood (D)	Undecided
Public Policy Polling (D)	July 7, 2026	785 (LV)	—	47%	38%	15%

=== Results ===
2026 United States Senate election in Maine
Party	Candidate	Votes	%	±%
Democratic	Troy Jackson	376,955	53.07	+10.68
Republican	Susan Collins (incumbent)	332,918	46.87	−4.11
Write-in		488	0.01	–0.02
Total votes		710,361	100.0	
Democratic gain from Republican				

==== By county ====
County	Susan Collins Republican		Troy Jackson Democratic		Margin		Total votes
County	#	%	#	%	#	%	Total votes
Androscoggin	27,373	54.34	23,005	45.66	-4,368	-8.68	50,378
Aroostook	17,510	65.02	9,420	34.98	-8,090	-30.04	26,930
Cumberland	57,234	32.69	117,828	67.31	60,594	34.62	193,984
Franklin	8,443	56.25	6,567	43.75	-1,876	-12.50	15,010
Hancock	14,260	45.12	17,345	54.88	3,085	9.76	31,605
Kennebec	32,969	53.22	28,982	46.78	-3,987	-6.44	61,951
Knox	9,036	41.28	12,853	58.72	3,817	17.44	25,758
Lincoln	9,820	45.38	11,819	54.62	1,999	9.24	21,639
Oxford	16,546	57.72	12,120	42.28	-4,426	-15.44	28,666
Penobscot	40,414	56.77	30,772	43.23	-9,642	-13.54	71,186
Piscataquis	5,529	68.18	2,581	31.82	-2,948	-36.36	8,110
Sagadahoc	9,383	42.51	12,690	57.49	3,307	14.98	22,073
Somerset	14,769	65.60	7,744	34.40	-7,025	-31.20	22,513
Waldo	10,656	48.25	11,431	51.75	775	3.50	22,087
Washington	8,476	62.41	5,105	37.59	3,371	-24.82	13,581
York	57,826	44.63	64,092	49.46	6,266	4.84	129,578

Counties that flipped from Republican to Democratic

- Hancock (largest municipality: Ellsworth)
- Lincoln (largest municipality: Waldoboro)
- Sagadahoc (largest municipality: Topsham)
- Waldo (largest municipality: Belfast)
- York (largest municipality: Biddeford)

==== By congressional district ====
Jackson and Collins each won one congressional district.

District	Jackson	Collins	Elected representative
1st	61.01%	38.84%	Chellie Pingree
2nd	44.01%	55.90%	Paul LePage

== Analysis ==
Jackson was able to flip five counties that Collins won in 2020, with Collins only retaining one county that both she won and Joe Biden won in the concurrent presidential election, Kennebec County. Instrumental to Jackson's victory was his improvement on Gideon's margin in several cities in Maine's 2nd congressional district, including flipping the cities of Bangor, Lewiston, Auburn, and Augusta. Following the election, there is no Republican senator from New England since the founding of the party in 1854. While Jackson won the election by 6.1 points, Maine was the only Senate race that swung more Republican compared to the 2024 presidential election, when Kamala Harris carried the state by 6.9 points. This can be attributed to Collins still maintaining some degree of crossover support, as 11% of Hannah Pingree voters in the 2026 Maine gubernatorial election still backed Collins.

=== Exit poll ===
2026 United States Senate election in Maine (CNN)
Demographic subgroup	Jackson	Collins	% of total vote
Ideology
Liberals	95	4	30
Moderates	55	45	40
Conservatives	7	93	30
Party
Democrats	92	7	29
Republicans	7	93	28
Independents	56	43	42
Donald Trump job approval
Approve	3	97	34
Disapprove	80	20	63
2024 presidential vote
Kamala Harris	91	9	50
Donald Trump	4	96	40
Another candidate	48	51	3
Did not vote	69	31	4
Gender
Men	49	51	48
Women	56	44	51
Income
$100,000 or more	51	49	40
$50,000-$99,999	54	46	35
Less than $50,000	56	44	25
White born-again or evangelical Christian?
Yes	16	84	16
No	61	39	84
Race by gender
White men	49	50	45
White women	57	43	47
All other voters	50	49	8
Age
18–29 years old	74	26	9
30–44 years old	60	40	19
45–64 years old	47	53	33
65 and older	50	50	39
Area type
Urban	67	33	8
Suburban	60	40	20
Rural	49	51	72
Education
College graduate	66	34	43
No college degree	43	57	57
Education by race
White college graduates	67	33	40
Non-white college graduates	58	42	3
Whites without college	43	57	53
Non-whites without college	37	63	4
Education by gender and race
White women with college degrees	71	29	21
White women without college degrees	45	55	26
White men with college degrees	62	38	19
White men without college degrees	41	59	27
Voters of color	50	49	7
Educational attainment
Advanced degree	70	30	18
Bachelor's degree	64	36	25
Associate's degree	39	61	14
Some college	50	50	19
Never attended college	39	61	24

== Notes ==
Partisan client
