= List of Joe Biden 2020 presidential campaign endorsements from organizations =

This is a list of notable organizations which have voiced their endorsement of Joe Biden's campaign for President of the United States in the 2020 U.S. presidential election.

== Activist groups ==
Everytown for Gun Safety

Human Rights Campaign

Indivisible

J Street

- 350 Action
- Alaskans Together for Equality
- Bend the Arc
- Brady Campaign
- CASA de Maryland
- Center for Biological Diversity
- Center for Popular Democracy
- Chesapeake Climate Action Network
- Citizens Union
- Clean Water Action
- Coalition for Humane Immigrant Rights of Los Angeles
- Coalition to Stop Gun Violence
- Color of Change
- Council for a Livable World
- Democratic Majority for Israel PAC
- End Citizens United
- Environment America
- Equality Arizona
- Equality California
- Equality Florida
- EqualityMaine
- Everytown for Gun Safety
- Fair Wisconsin
- Friends of the Earth
- Garden State Equality
- Giffords
- Harvey Milk Lesbian, Gay, Bisexual, Transgender Democratic Club
- High School Democrats of America
- Houston GLBT Political Caucus
- Human Rights Campaign
- Humane Society of the United States
- Indivisible
- J Street
- Jewish Democratic Council of America
- Justice for Janitors
- League of Conservation Voters
- Let America Vote
- MoveOn
- NARAL Pro-Choice America
- National Association of Social Workers
- National Center for Transgender Equality
- National Iranian American Council
- National LGBT Chamber of Commerce
- National Organization for Women
- National Wildlife Federation
- Natural Resources Defense Council
- People for the American Way
- The People's Alliance
- Planned Parenthood
- Population Connection
- Protect Our Winters
- Republican Voters against Trump
- The RINJ Foundation
- Sierra Club
- Southern Alliance for Clean Energy
- Stonewall Democrats
- Stonewall Democrats Utah
- Sunrise Movement
- UltraViolet
- UnidosUS
- U.S. Women's Chamber of Commerce
- VoteVets
- Voto Latino

== Labor unions ==
=== National and international unions ===
- Actors' Equity Association, representing 43,648
- AFL–CIO, representing 13 million
- Alliance for Retired Americans, representing 4.4 million
- Amalgamated Transit Union, representing 200,000
- American Federation of Government Employees, representing 670,000
- American Federation of Musicians, representing 73,071
- American Federation of School Administrators, representing 20,000
- American Federation of State, County, and Municipal Employees, representing 1.3 million
- American Federation of Teachers, representing 1.7 million
- American Guild of Musical Artists, representing 7,523
- American Postal Workers Union, representing 330,000
- American Train Dispatchers Association, representing 2,718
- Association of Flight Attendants, representing 50,000
- Association of Professional Flight Attendants, representing 26,000
- Association of Theatrical Press Agents & Managers
- Bakery, Confectionery, Tobacco Workers and Grain Millers' International Union, representing 73,694
- Brotherhood of Railroad Signalmen, representing 10,500
- Civil Service Employees Association, representing 300,000
- Coalition of Black Trade Unionists, representing 1.2 million
- Communications Workers of America, representing 700,000
- International Alliance of Theatrical Stage Employees, representing 150,000
- International Association of Bridge, Structural, Ornamental, and Reinforcing Iron Workers, representing 130,000
- International Association of Fire Fighters, representing 313,000
- International Association of Heat and Frost Insulators and Allied Workers, representing 30,000
- International Association of Machinists and Aerospace Workers, representing 570,000
- International Association of Sheet Metal, Air, Rail and Transportation Workers, representing 216,000
- International Brotherhood of Electrical Workers, representing 725,000
- International Brotherhood of Teamsters, representing 1.4 million
- International Federation of Professional and Technical Engineers, representing 80,000
- International Longshore and Warehouse Union, representing 33,000
- International Longshoremen's Association, representing 65,000
- International Organization of Masters, Mates & Pilots, representing 5,500
- International Union of Bricklayers and Allied Craftworkers
- International Union of Elevator Constructors, representing 28,620
- International Union of Operating Engineers, Representing 374,000
- International Union of Painters and Allied Trades, representing 103,858
- Laborers' International Union of North America, representing 557,999
- Marine Engineers' Beneficial Association, representing 23,400
- National Association of Government Employees, representing over 100,000
- National Association of Letter Carriers, representing over 300,000
- National Education Association, representing 3 million
- National Federation of Federal Employees, representing 100,000
- National Nurses United, representing 150,000 (Note: Previously endorsed Bernie Sanders.)
- National Postal Mail Handlers Union, representing 50,000
- National Treasury Employees Union, representing 150,000
- North America's Building Trades Unions, representing 3 million
- Office and Professional Employees International Union, representing 105,000
- Operative Plasterers' and Cement Masons' International Association, representing 44,000
- Pride at Work
- Retail, Wholesale and Department Store Union, representing 60,522
- Sailors' Union of the Pacific, representing 736
- Seafarers International Union, representing 35,498
- Service Employees International Union, representing 1.9 million
- Stage Directors and Choreographers Society, representing 2,652
- Transport Workers Union of America, representing 151,000
- Transportation Trades Department, AFL–CIO
- UNITE HERE, representing 300,000
- United Association, representing 329,954
- United Autoworkers, representing 390,000
- United Brotherhood of Carpenters and Joiners of America, Representing 445,000
- United Farm Workers, representing 10,278
- United Food and Commercial Workers, representing 1.3 million
- United Steelworkers, representing 1.2 million
- United Union of Roofers, Waterproofers and Allied Workers, representing 18,750
- Utility Workers Union of America, representing 50,000
- Writers Guild of America West, representing 24,440

=== Statewide and local unions ===
- 1199SEIU United Healthcare Workers East, representing 347,139
- AFSCME Council 31, representing 100,000
- California Federation of Teachers, representing 120,000
- California School Employees Association, representing 248,000
- California Teachers Association, representing 310,000
- Chicago Teachers Union, representing 25,000
- Connecticut Education Association, representing 43,000
- Culinary Workers Union, representing 60,000
- District Council 37, representing 225,000
- Education Minnesota, representing 86,000
- Florida AFL–CIO, representing 500,000
- King County Labor Council, representing 75,000
- Maine AFL–CIO, representing 36,000
- Maine State Employees Association, representing 13,000
- Maine State Nurses Association, representing 2,000
- Massachusetts AFL–CIO, representing 400,000
- Michigan Education Association, representing 157,000
- New York City Central Labor Council, representing 1.5 million
- Ohio Federation of Teachers, representing 20,000
- Oregon AFL–CIO, representing 125,000
- Pennsylvania AFL–CIO, representing 800,000
- Rhode Island AFL–CIO, representing 80,000
- SEIU 1199 WKO
- SEIU 32BJ, representing 75,000
- South Bay Labor Council, representing 100,000
- Texas AFL–CIO, representing 235,000
- Texas State Teachers Association, representing 68,000
- UFCW Local 1776, representing 20,000
- Virginia AFL-CIO
- Washington State Labor Council, representing 550,000
- West Virginia AFL–CIO, representing 80,000
- Wisconsin AFL–CIO, representing 250,000

== Political organizations ==
- 314 Action
- 43 Alumni for Biden
- Alabama Democratic Conference
- Alice B. Toklas LGBT Democratic Club
- American Bridge 21st Century
- Asian American Action Fund
- ASPIRE PAC
- Black Economic Alliance
- BOLD PAC
- College Democrats of America
- Congressional Black Caucus PAC
- Democratic Black Caucus of Florida
- Democratic Governors Association
- Democrats for Education Reform
- Emerge America
- EMILY's List
- Equality PAC
- Fair Share Action
- Fraternal PAC
- Fuse Washington
- Independent Voters of Illinois-Independent Precinct Organization
- Indiana Black Legislative Caucus
- Joint Action Committee for Political Affairs
- Justice Democrats
- National Committee to Preserve Social Security and Medicare
- National Conference of Democratic Mayors
- National Federation of Democratic Women
- National Women's Political Caucus
- New Democrat Coalition
- NextGen America
- Occupy Democrats
- Priorities USA Action
- Progressive Change Campaign Committee
- Public Affairs Council
- REPAIR
- Right Side PAC
- SAVE Dade
- Young Democrats of America

== Political parties ==
Working Families Party

=== International ===
- Grupo de Puebla (Mexico)
- More Europe (Italy)
- Social Democrat Hunchakian Party (Armenia)
- Social Democratic Party of Croatia (Croatia)
- Vetëvendosje (Kosovo)

=== National ===
- Working Families Party (previously endorsed Elizabeth Warren, then Bernie Sanders) (Note: Previously endorsed multiple candidates.)

=== State and territorial ===
- Alabama Democratic Party
- Alaska Democratic Party
- Arizona Democratic Party
- Arkansas Democratic Party
- California Democratic Party
- Colorado Democratic Party
- Connecticut Democratic Party
- Connecticut Working Families Party
- Delaware Democratic Party
- Democrats Abroad
- District of Columbia Democratic State Committee
- Florida Democratic Party
- Georgia Democratic Party
- Guam Democratic Party
- Hawaii Democratic Party
- Idaho Democratic Party
- Illinois Democratic Party
- Iowa Democratic Party
- Kansas Democratic Party
- Kentucky Democratic Party
- Louisiana Democratic Party
- Maine Democratic Party
- Maryland Democratic Party
- Massachusetts Democratic Party
- Michigan Democratic Party
- Minnesota Democratic-Farmer-Labor Party
- Mississippi Democratic Party
- Nebraska Democratic Party
- Nevada Democratic Party
- New Hampshire Democratic Party
- New Jersey Democratic Party
- New Mexico Democratic Party
- New York State Democratic Committee
- North Carolina Democratic Party
- North Dakota Democratic-Nonpartisan League Party
- Northern Mariana Islands Democratic Party
- Ohio Democratic Party
- Oklahoma Democratic Party
- Oregon Democratic Party
- Oregon Independent Party
- Pennsylvania Democratic Party
- Puerto Rico Democratic Party
- South Carolina Democratic Party
- South Dakota Democratic Party
- Tennessee Democratic Party
- Texas Democratic Party
- Utah Democratic Party
- Vermont Democratic Party
- Virgin Islands Democratic Party
- Virginia Democratic Party
- Washington Democratic Party
- Wisconsin Democratic Party
- Wyoming Democratic Party

=== Local ===
- Brooklyn Democratic Party
- Cook County Democratic Party

== Websites ==
- BroadwayWorld
- CleanTechnica
- Daily Kos
- Electrek
- Hollywood Life
- Off The Bench Baseball
- RogerEbert.com
- ToughPigs.com

== Other ==
=== Congressional delegations ===
- Delaware
- Rhode Island
- Vermont

=== Towns and tribes ===
- Ballina, County Mayo (Ireland)
- Mashpee Wampanoag Tribe
- Thulasendrapuram (India)

=== Companies and private enterprises ===
- The Araca Group
- Creators Syndicate
- Expensify
- Gemini G.E.L.
- Rabobank
- Seattle Storm
- Team Love Records
- Vestas

== See also ==
- Endorsements in the 2020 Democratic Party presidential primaries
- News media endorsements in the 2020 United States presidential primaries
- News media endorsements in the 2020 United States presidential election
- List of Donald Trump 2020 presidential campaign political endorsements
- List of Donald Trump 2020 presidential campaign non-political endorsements
- List of former Trump administration officials who endorsed Joe Biden
- List of Jo Jorgensen 2020 presidential campaign endorsements
- List of Howie Hawkins 2020 presidential campaign endorsements
- List of Republicans who opposed the Donald Trump 2020 presidential campaign
- List of Joe Biden 2020 presidential campaign celebrity endorsements
- List of Joe Biden 2024 presidential campaign primary endorsements
