= Joe Biden presidential campaign endorsements =

Joe Biden presidential campaign endorsements may refer to:

- List of Joe Biden 2008 presidential campaign endorsements
- List of Joe Biden 2020 presidential campaign endorsements (primaries)
  - Celebrity endorsements
  - Congressional endorsements
  - Municipal endorsements
  - Organizational endorsements
  - State and territorial legislative endorsements
- List of Joe Biden 2024 presidential campaign primary endorsements
