= Shenna Bellows =

American politician and civil rights advocate (born 1975)

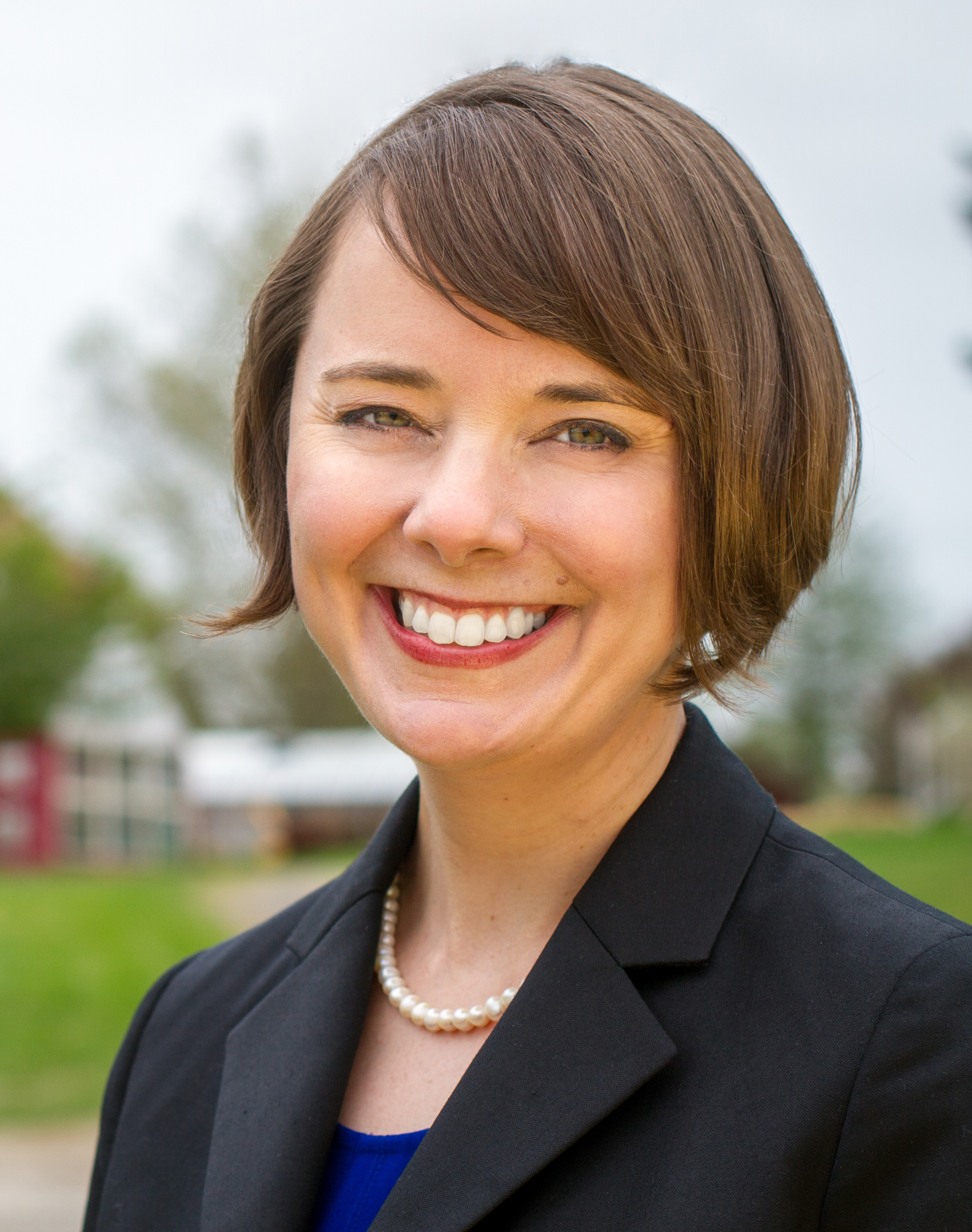
- Bellows in 2014

50th Secretary of State of Maine
- Incumbent
- Assumed office January 4, 2021
- Governor: Janet Mills
- Preceded by: Matthew Dunlap

Member of the Maine Senate from the 14th district
- In office December 7, 2016 – December 2, 2020
- Preceded by: Earle McCormick
- Succeeded by: Craig Hickman

Personal details
- Born: Shenna Lee Bellows; March 23, 1975 (age 51) Greenfield, Massachusetts, U.S.
- Party: Democratic
- Spouse: Brandon Baldwin (m. 2012)
- Education: Middlebury College (BA)

Shenna Lee Bellows (born March 23, 1975) is an American politician and civil rights advocate who has served as the 50th Secretary of State of Maine since 2021. A member of the Democratic Party, she is the first woman to hold this position.

Before entering politics, Bellows served as executive director of the American Civil Liberties Union (ACLU) of Maine from 2005 to 2013, and later as executive director of the Holocaust and Human Rights Center of Maine from 2018 to 2020.

She was the Maine Democratic Party nominee in the 2014 United States Senate election in Maine, which Bellows lost to incumbent Republican Senator Susan Collins by 36 percentage points. She served in the Maine Senate from 2016 to 2020, representing the 14th district. As Secretary of State, Bellows ruled that Donald Trump was ineligible for Maine's Republican primary ballot due to his role in the January 6 United States Capitol attack; her ruling was overturned by the U.S. Supreme Court in a unanimous decision.

Bellows ran for Governor of Maine in the 2026 Maine gubernatorial election Democratic primary, but was defeated, coming in fourth. Following the withdrawal of Democratic nominee Graham Platner from the race for the 2026 United States Senate election in Maine, she entered the race on July 9, 2026, seeking to win the Democratic nomination and again face Susan Collins, but Bellows withdrew from the race on July 19 after Troy Jackson won nearly 300 delegates the prior day.

== Early life and education ==
Shenna Bellows was born on March 23, 1975, in Greenfield, Massachusetts, to Dexter Bellows, a carpenter, and Janice Colson, who became a nurse after going to college at 49 years of age. She was raised in a log cabin in the small, rural town of Hancock, Maine. She graduated from Hancock Grammar School in 1989. Her family experienced economic hardship during her childhood, living without running water or electricity until she was in fifth grade.

At age 15, Bellows won a scholarship that allowed her to spend six months studying international politics in an AFS–USA foreign exchange program in Campos, Brazil. She graduated from Ellsworth High School in 1993, and was later inducted into the Ellsworth High School Hall of Fame.

Bellows earned a Bachelor of Arts degree in International Politics and Economics magna cum laude from Middlebury College in 1997, receiving highest honors for her thesis on economic and environmental sustainability. During high school and college, she worked as a research assistant at the Mount Desert Island Biological Laboratory located in Salisbury Cove, Maine, on Mount Desert Island, contributing to published research on marine fish physiology.

== Early career ==
=== Economic consulting firm (1997–1999) ===
From 1997 to 1999 Bellows worked as a researcher and recruiter for Economists Incorporated, an economic consulting firm in Washington, D.C., specializing in antitrust, regulatory and legal matters.

=== Peace Corps and AmeriCorps VISTA (1999–2002) ===
Bellows served for the Peace Corps from 1999 to 2001as a small-business-development volunteer in La Arena de Chitré, Panama. In Panama, she launched a micro-lending program for artisans, started a Junior Achievement entrepreneurship program at a local high school, and was President of Women In Development/Gender and Development, dedicated to advancing economic and educational opportunity for women and girls.

From 2001 to 2002, Bellows was an AmeriCorps VISTA volunteer in Nashville, Tennessee. There she assisted a start-up non-profit, Community IMPACT!, in developing an asset building program designed to promote educational and economic empowerment for young people in Nashville’s largest public housing project.

=== ACLU (2003–13) ===
From 2003 to 2005, Bellows was the national field organizer of the American Civil Liberties Union (ACLU) in Washington, D.C., organizing nationwide civil liberties campaigns including opposition to the Patriot Act, where she built coalitions that included librarians and gun owners alike.

Bellows served as executive director of the ACLU of Maine for eight years, from 2005 to 2013. In that role, she built coalitions with both Republicans and Democrats to pass state privacy laws and civil rights laws. She was a leader of the political coalition Mainers United for Marriage, working for seven years to pass same-sex marriage in Maine. She was a leader on voting rights, and co-chaired the 2011 Protect Maine Votes campaign to restore same-day voter registration in Maine. She also organized a successful privacy campaign to require warrants for access to private cell phone communications, and she led the opposition to warrantless drone surveillance.

During those years, Bellows was also a leader in the Maine Choice Coalition and the Coalition for Maine Women. She was recognized for her work to advance women’s health and reproductive choice by awards from the University of Maine Women’s Studies Department, the Mabel Wadsworth Women’s Health Center, the American Association of University Women, the Frances Perkins Center, and the Maine Democratic Party.

=== Consulting (2015–17) ===
From 2015 to 2017, Bellows founded and owned Bellows & Company, a private consulting firm that specialized in assisting non-profit organizations. Through her firm, she provided strategic and advocacy consulting to regional entities, including the Sierra Club's Maine Chapter, Consumers for Affordable Healthcare, and the Maine Women's Lobby.

=== Holocaust and Human Rights Center of Maine (2018–20) ===
Bellows served as executive director of the Holocaust and Human Rights Center of Maine, located on the campus of the University of Maine at Augusta, from 2018 to 2020. She focused on community outreach and education aimed at preserving historical memory and advancing contemporary civil rights. Her responsibilities included facilitating educational programs that detailed the histories of Holocaust survivors and global genocides, which she utilized to emphasize public unity and standing up against bigotry. She later reflected that her work alongside Holocaust survivors deeply informed her governance philosophy regarding the fragility of democratic institutions, the critical importance of recording public history, and the need for administrative transparency.

== Political career ==
=== 2014 U.S. Senate campaign ===
Bellows launched her candidacy for the United States Senate in 2014 on October 23, 2013. She was not opposed in the Democratic primary. In November, she was defeated by incumbent Republican Susan Collins in the general election in a landslide, 67% to 31%, losing in every county and in both congressional districts.

=== Maine Senate (2016–20) ===
In 2016 Bellows ran for the Maine Senate in district 14, including her hometown of Manchester and ten other towns in the Augusta area, as a publicly financed candidate. She was elected on November 8, 2016, with 44% of the vote in a three-way race, and took office on December 7, 2016.

She won reelection to the Maine Senate in 2018, defeating Republican Matt Stone with 58% of the vote. She was reelected again in 2020, winning 56% of the vote over Republican Mark Walker. Bellows resigned from the Senate on December 2, 2020.

=== Secretary of State of Maine (2021–present) ===
In December 2020, Bellows was appointed Secretary of State of Maine by the Maine Legislature. Unlike the vast majority of U.S. states which choose the office by popular vote, Maine's Secretary of State is appointed under a unique system instead by the Maine Legislature. Bellows was appointed in this manner, by the Democratic-controlled state legislature She is the first woman to hold the position.

In July 2026, Bellows invalidated a citizen-initiated proposed Maine ballot question supported by the "Protect Girls' Sports in Maine" campaign, which sought to restrict transgender athletes from playing on public school sports teams and accessing public school locker rooms and bathrooms that did not align with their biological sex. Across the United States, 27 states had passed laws adopting parallel restrictions. She said that the petition organizers had failed to gather the legally required number of valid voter signatures to qualify for the ballot. A total of 67,682 signatures was required to put the question on the ballot. Bellows rejected 1,520 of the signatures that had been collected, because the submitters of the signatures had not checked a box on an affidavit agreeing to submit to Maine's jurisdiction; 1,472 of the signatures that she rejected had been collected by a submitter who did check the box, but did so on May 6, three months after submitting the petition for validation. Bellows then held that the remaining number of signatures, which she deemed to be 66,162, was 532 signatures short of the required number of signatures. On July 10, 2026, the Maine Supreme Judicial Court unanimously affirmed her decision.

==== Disqualification of Donald Trump from Maine primary ballot ====
In December 2023, three Maine voters filed challenges to former president Donald Trump's petition to appear on the 2024 Republican presidential primary ballot in Maine. On December 15, Bellows held a public evidentiary hearing to consider the validity of those challenges. On December 28, she ruled that Trump was barred from the ballot due to his conduct during the January 6 United States Capitol attack, pending appeal.

The day after she ruled Trump ineligible, Bellows was doxxed, with her home address published online, and was swatted on December 29, 2023. The incident was one of a number in late 2023 in which a politician was targeted by a person reporting a fake crime to the police.

On January 2, 2024, Trump appealed Bellows' December 28 decision to the Maine Superior Court. The court ordered Bellows to reconsider her disqualification decision pending a ruling from the United States Supreme Court on Trump's ballot access. Bellows unsuccessfully appealed the Superior Court ruling to the Maine Supreme Court, which unanimously dismissed her request.

Bellows' disqualification of Trump, along with the disqualification of Trump by two other states, was overturned by the U.S. Supreme Court in a unanimous ruling in Trump v. Anderson on March 4, 2024. Bellows rescinded her disqualification of Trump from ballot access later that day.

=== 2026 gubernatorial campaign ===
In March 2025, Bellows announced her candidacy in the 2026 Maine gubernatorial election. Bellows ultimately finished fourth in the primary among voters' first preferences, behind Hannah Pingree, Nirav Shah, and Troy Jackson, and was the second candidate eliminated in ranked-choice voting tabulation, with 22% of the vote as of that round. The primary was won by Hannah Pingree, whom she had cross-endorsed along with Troy Jackson.

=== 2026 U.S. Senate campaign ===
Following the withdrawal of Democratic nominee Graham Platner from the 2026 United States Senate election in Maine, Bellows entered the race on July 9, 2026. She promised to work towards unifying Maine's Democratic Party, and pledged to challenge corporate influence and to advocate for working-class families. The Democratic nominee will face incumbent Maine Senator Susan Collins, who defeated Bellows for the same seat in 2014. Ten days later, on July 19, Bellows withdrew from the race, saying she wanted to focus on her job as Secretary of State.

=== Political positions ===
==== Abortion ====
Bellows supports abortion rights, describing herself as "a strong advocate for women's healthcare and reproductive freedom including access to abortion and contraception".

==== Climate change ====
Bellows supports federal regulation of greenhouse gas emissions to combat climate change. During her tenure in the Maine Senate, Bellows focused heavily on environmental policy and clean energy transition. She maintained a consistent pro-environment voting record, earning consecutive 100% perfect scores on the annual environmental scorecards released by the Maine Conservation Voters.

==== Death penalty ====
She opposes the death penalty. Bellows views capital punishment as an unconstitutional violation of the Eighth Amendment's prohibition against cruel and unusual punishment.

==== Defense ====
Bellows supports large cuts to the U.S. defense budget, and largely opposes military intervention by the U.S., saying "we cannot afford to be the world's military policeman".

At the same time, Bellows condemned Russia's invasion of Ukraine and explicitly distinguished Russia's war in Ukraine as an issue of unprovoked Russian aggression requiring robust defense of international sovereignty. In February 2023, Bellows was placed on a Kremlin travel blacklist. Bellows said that she was "honored to be included on this list," and expressed solidarity with Ukraine, remarking, "Count me in on the side of freedom and democracy."

==== Elections ====
Bellows opposes the 2010 Citizens United v. FEC decision in which the U.S. Supreme Court held that laws restricting the political spending of corporations and labor unions are unconstitutional, and supports public financing of elections and strong disclosure requirements.

==== Environment ====
Bellows supports aggressive climate action and strict environmental regulation, strict conservation mandates, and expanding the time limits within which plaintiffs can bring environmental litigation. She also wants to freeze electric rates, and cap utility profits.

==== Government subsidies ====
Bellows wants to greatly decrease subsidies for large agricultural corporations.

==== Gun control ====
Bellows has advocated for stricter firearm regulations in Maine, and has been endorsed as a "Gun Safety Champion" by the Maine Gun Safety Coalition. As Maine Secretary of State, she supported legislative efforts to grant municipalities the authority to prohibit firearms in public buildings and polling places, to address election security and voter anxiety. Additionally, Bellows oversaw the official finalization of the ballot wording for the state's November 2025 citizen-initiated "red flag" extreme risk protection order law. Bellows has also advocated for strengthening accountability for firearm vendors, and closing background check loopholes on private gun sales.

==== Healthcare ====
Bellows opposes efforts to repeal the Affordable Care Act, and supports expanding coverage through the Medicaid and Medicare programs.

==== Labor ====
During her tenure in the Maine Senate, Bellows served as the Senate Chair of the Joint Standing Committee on Labor and Housing. In this role, she focused on advancing workplace safety standards, collective bargaining protections, and expanding safe and affordable housing. Her legislative record earned her endorsements from prominent labor organizations, including being named a "champion" for state workers by the Maine Service Employees Association (MSEA-SEIU Local 1989).

==== License plates ====
In January 2026, Bellows instructed the Maine Bureau of Motor Vehicles to halt the issuance of unmarked license plates to federal law enforcement agencies, following an enforcement request from U.S. Customs and Border Protection. The U.S. Department of Justice asserted that her action was unconstitutional, as it violated the Supremacy Clause of the U.S. Constitution, and filed a federal lawsuit.

==== LGBTQ+ rights ====
She led the effort to enact marriage equality in Maine as the head of Mainers United for Marriage. She supports federal anti-discrimination protections for LGBTQ+ people.

==== Minimum wage ====
In 2014, she supported increasing the federal minimum wage to $10.10, and indexing it to inflation. In 2016, she supported a ballot initiative to gradually raise Maine’s minimum wage to $12 by 2020.

==== Racial justice and human rights ====
Bellows has advocated for systemic racial justice and human rights, emphasizing the importance of community resistance against bigotry, xenophobia, and racism. She has called on communities to unite against the "othering and dehumanization" of minority populations. As Secretary of State, she co-signed the official Maine proclamation commemorating International Holocaust Remembrance Day, which formally defines and condemns manifestations of antisemitism as an assault on humanity. She has supported state-level policy efforts aimed at addressing racial disparities in law enforcement, broadening educational and economic opportunities for communities of color, and ensuring equitable protections for immigrants and asylum seekers.

==== Taxation ====
She supports decreasing the tax burden on lower- and middle-income families, as well as small businesses. But she wants to "make sure the wealthiest Americans pay their fair share" and does not support lowering taxes for high-earners or corporations. Bellows supports large increases in corporate and capital gains taxes, as well as the personal income tax rates for higher-earning brackets.

Bellows has proposed a statewide freeze on residential property taxes. To fund the freeze, Bellows advocated for doubling property tax rates on vacation homes, seasonal properties, and out-of-state investment holdings.

Bellows advocates for eliminating the cap on income taxable under the social security payroll tax in order to increase benefits.

==== Tribal sovereignty ====
Bellows supports full tribal sovereignty for the Wabanaki Nations, which include the Houlton Band of Maliseet Indians, Mi'kmaq, Passamaquoddy, and Penobscot. She has advocated for reforming the 1980 Maine Indian Claims Settlement Act, which restricts local tribes to the legal status of municipalities rather than sovereign nations. She has been endorsed by the Houlton Band of Maliseet Indians.

== Personal life ==
Bellows lives with her husband, Brandon Baldwin. The two married in 2013 at their home in Manchester in Kennebec County.

== Electoral history ==
=== 2016 ===
Democratic primary for the 2016 Maine Senate election, district 14
Party	Candidate	Votes	%
Democratic	Shenna Bellows	1,947	81.74
Democratic	Terry Berry	435	18.26
Total votes		2,382	100.0

2016 Maine Senate general election, district 14
Party	Candidate	Votes	%
Democratic	Shenna Bellows	9,816	43.6
Republican	Bryan Cutchen	8,082	35.9
Independent	Joseph Pietroski	4,012	17.8
Total votes		22,529	100.0
Democratic gain from Republican			

=== 2018 ===
2018 Maine Senate general election, district 14
Party	Candidate	Votes	%
Democratic	Shenna Bellows (incumbent)	10,790	57.89%
Republican	Matthew Stone	7,850	42.11%
Total votes		18,640	100.0
Democratic hold			

=== 2020 ===
2020 Maine Senate General election, district 14
Primary election
Party	Candidate	Votes	%
Democratic	Shenna Bellows (incumbent)	4,285	90.9%
Democratic	Danielle Grondin-Stevens	431	9.1%
Total votes		4,716	100.0%
General election
Democratic	Shenna Bellows (incumbent)	12,998	56.06
Republican	Mark Walker	10,189	43.94
Total votes		23,737	100.00
Democratic hold			

=== United States Senate ===
Democratic primary for the 2014 United States Senate election in Maine
Party	Candidate	Votes	%
Democratic	Shenna Bellows	47,909	73.6%
	Other and blank	17,176	26.4%
Total votes		65,085	100.0%

2014 United States Senate election in Maine
Party	Candidate	Votes	%
Republican	Susan Collins	413,505	67.0%
Democratic	Shenna Bellows	190,254	30.8%
Total votes		603,759	100.0%
Republican hold			

=== Gubernatorial ===
2026 Maine Democratic gubernatorial primary results
Party	Candidate	Round 1			Round 2			Round 3			Round 4	
Party	Candidate	Votes	%	Transfer	Votes	%	Transfer	Votes	%	Transfer	Votes	%
Democratic	Hannah Pingree	50,552	23.3	+4,808	55,360	26.0	+ 20,311	75,671	36.3	+ 36,079	111,750	56.2
Democratic	Nirav Shah	58,606	26.8	+ 4,255	62,860	29.5	+9,821	72,681	34.8	+ 14,269	86,950	43.8
Democratic	Troy Jackson	45,959	21.1	+ 1,638	47,597	22.3	+ 12,413	60,010	28.8	60,010	Eliminated	
Democratic	Shenna Bellows	44,770	20.6	+ 2,279	47,049	22.1	47,049	Eliminated				
Democratic	Angus King III	17,860	8.3	17,860	Eliminated							
Continuing ballots		217,747	100.0		212,848	97.8		208,542	100.0		198,700	91.1
Exhausted ballots		–		+ 4,881	4,881	2.2	+ 4,504	9,385	4.3	+ 9,662	19,047	8.9
Total votes		217,747	100.0		217,747	100.0		217,747	100.0		217,747	100.0

Party political offices
Preceded by Tom Allen	Democratic nominee for U.S. Senator from Maine (Class 2); 2014	Succeeded by Sara Gideon
Political offices
Preceded by Matthew Dunlap	Secretary of State of Maine; 2021–present	Incumbent
