= Maine's 14th State Senate district =

American legislative district

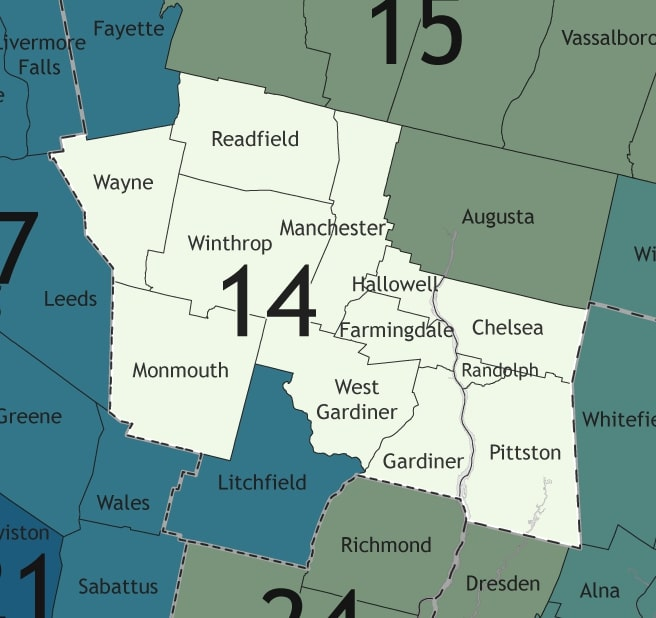
Senator
Craig Hickman; D–Winthrop
- Registration: 36.4% Democratic; 32.8% Republican; 30.8% No party preference
- Population (2020): 39,059

Maine's 14th State Senate district is one of 35 districts in the Maine Senate. It has been represented by Democrat Craig Hickman since the 2021 special election.

== Geography ==
District 14 is made up of a small part of Kennebec County. It includes the cities of Gardiner and Hallowell.

Kennebec County - 31.6% of county

Kennebec:

Cities:

- Gardiner
- Hallowell

Towns:

- Chelsea
- Manchester
- Monmouth
- Pittston
- Randolph
- Redfield
- Wayne
- West Gardiner
- Winthrop

== Recent election results ==
=== 2022 ===
2022 Maine State Senate election, District 14
Party	Candidate	Votes	%
Democratic	Craig Hickman	10,940	52.4
Republican	Jeffery Hanley	9,936	47.6
Total votes		20,876	100.0
Democratic hold			

Elections prior to 2022 were held under different district lines.

=== 2024 ===
2024 Maine State Senate election, District 14
Party	Candidate	Votes	%
Democratic	Craig Hickman	12,763	52.6
Republican	Shannon McDonnell	11,491	47.4
Total votes		25,039	100.0
Democratic hold			

== Historical election results ==
=== 2012 ===
2012 Maine State Senate election, District 14
Party	Candidate	Votes	%
Democratic	John Patrick	10,529	56.8
Republican	C. Harvey Calden	5,562	30
Independent	Leonard Greaney	2,442	13.2
Total votes		18,533	100
Democratic hold			

=== 2014 ===
2014 Maine State Senate election, District 14
Party	Candidate	Votes	%
Republican	Earle McCormick	9,741	50.7
Democratic	David Bustin	7,219	37.6
Independent	Gary Quintal	1,504	7.8
Blank votes	None	745	3.9
Total votes		19,209	100
Republican gain from Democratic			

=== 2016 ===
2018 Maine State Senate election, District 14
Party	Candidate	Votes	%
Democratic	Shenna Bellows	9,816	44.8
Republican	Bryan Cutcher	8,082	36.9
Independent	Joseph Pietroski	4,012	18.3
Total votes		21,910	100
Democratic gain from Republican			

=== 2018 ===
2018 Maine State Senate election, District 14
Party	Candidate	Votes	%
Democratic	Shenna Bellows	10,790	57.9
Republican	Matthew Stone	7,850	42.1
Total votes		18,640	100
Democratic hold			

=== 2020 ===
2020 Maine State Senate election, District 14
Party	Candidate	Votes	%
Democratic	Shenna Bellows	12,998	56.1
Republican	Mark Walker	10,189	43.9
Total votes		23,187	100
Democratic hold			

=== 2021 - Special ===
2021 Maine Senate district 14 special election
Party	Candidate	Votes	%
Democratic	Craig Hickman	5,248	62.6
Republican	William Guerrette	3,136	37.4
Total votes		8,384	100
Democratic hold			
