= Eastern Maine Medical Center =

Northern Light Eastern Maine Medical Center
- Location within Maine

Geography
- Location: Bangor, Penobscot County, Maine, United States
- Coordinates: 44.8082°N 68.7514°W

Organization
- Network: Northern Light Health

Services
- Emergency department: Level II trauma center
- Beds: Licensed for 411; 350 in use

Helipads
- Helipad: Yes

History
- Founded: June 7, 1892

Links
- Lists: Hospitals in Maine

Northern Light Eastern Maine Medical Center (frequently shorted to Eastern Maine or simply EMMC) is a hospital located in Bangor, Maine that serves communities throughout central, eastern, and northern Maine. NLEMMC is the second largest hospital in the state with 411 inpatient beds, serves more than 40% of the population of the state, and is the sixth largest employer in the state.

NLEMMC is a Level II trauma center and a home for one of three helicopters from LifeFlight of Maine. Northern Light Eastern Maine Medical Center is also a major training affiliate of the University of New England College of Osteopathic Medicine. According to Leapfrog Group, NLEMMC is one of 16 hospitals that were "A"-rated for safety in Maine; 80% of the state's hospitals received "A"-grades, surpassed only by Massachusetts with 83%.

== History ==
In March 1891, a public meeting in Bangor resulted in a petition's being circulated calling for the "establishment, operation, and maintenance of a General Hospital for the charitable and benevolent purposes of aiding, treating and relieving the sick, injured and disabled..." The petition was signed by 70 citizens. A year later, five physicians: Doctors William Mason, Walter Hunt, Everett Nealey, William Baxter and William Simmons published a notice in a local newspaper announcing that a Bangor General Hospital would open its doors on June 7, 1892; this caused some controversy over whether such a notice constituted "advertising" and thus violated the Medical Code of Ethics. A paper was read on the issue at the annual AMA meeting in Milwaukee, and a Dr. D. A. Robinson argued for the hospital.

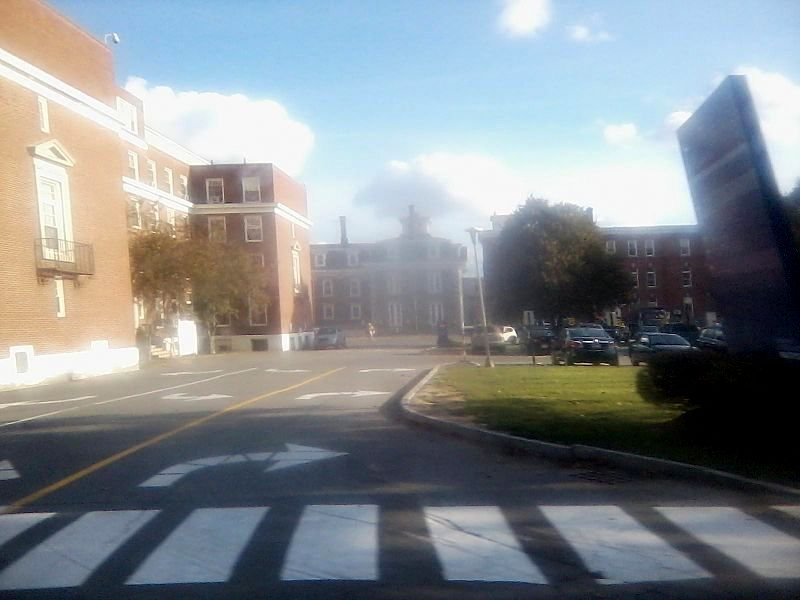
The Benjamin Mace house, the three-story gray building in the center at the end of the road, is the original building that housed NLEMMC.

The new hospital opened on schedule in a rented space in the Mace House. A Boston City Hospital graduate, Elizabeth Spratt, was hired as superintendent of the hospital and organized a school for nurses. That summer, three students enrolled into the program, and those students served as the primary nursing staff under Spratt. December saw the incorporation of the hospital, and Charles Hamlin stepping up as president of what is now the board of trustees; one hundred other citizens stepped up as well to provide funding, most notably Pricilla Blake, who provided $1,000 to the hospital.

In 1893, Ellen Paine was headhunted from Mass General to replace Spratt as superintendent. The hospital trustees made plans to approach the Maine State Legislature to request funding, as over 2/3 of the patients being admitted were from outside of Bangor, but the plans were abandoned to allow for the money to fund the construction of the Eastern Maine Insane Asylum, now the Dorothea Dix Psychiatric Center. Instead, it purchased the Mace house with the pledges paid by the trustees. However, overcrowding quickly became an issue, and to free up interior beds, the hospital pitched a tent during the summer to provide a recovery room for male outpatient surgery patients.

The hospital staff divided itself in two in October 1895; a medical staff, headed by Drs. Woodcock, McCann, Swett, and Edmunds; and a surgical staff headed by Drs. Simmons, Mason, Hunt, Robinson and Phillips. Later that same year, the board of trustees voted to allow the hospital matron to set the cost of boarding at the hospital and arrange for bill collections. They also voted to disallow nonresidents of Bangor from being admitted to the hospital, except in an emergency, without a letter from their primary care physician stating the reason for their admission and a statement as to the patient's ability to pay. Charles Hamlin explained that "while certain regulations are necessary and it is not practicable to admit a large number of patients free, the trustees believe that it is better to err on the side of liberality and they have deemed the wisest policy to be a liberal one." A dental surgeon, Dr. Langdon S. Chilcott, began work for the hospital the same year, and later the hospital was converted to electric lighting and laundry facilities were added in the basement.

In 1896, the name of the hospital was changed to Eastern Maine General Hospital, to reflect the fact that most of its financial support came from the state, not the city. An addition was constructed to the Mace House, a horse shed was added, "a very commodious bathroom" was built on the second floor, and the outside of the facilities were improved. Dr. Harry Butler, an ear, nose, and throat surgeon, was also hired on. Donations to the hospital this year were expansive, including barrels of apples, canned fruit, fresh flower, and at Christmastime, holiday cakes and gifts.

The hospital was chartered in 1897 by the Maine State Legislature, and a committee came to inspect the facilities. Mabel Hammons, a nursing student, recalls that "the always immaculate little building had an extra going over; nurses wore their best uniforms, patients were implored to smile, look comfortable and not require bedpans while the Legislature was here." A new building to ease overcrowding and provide additional surgical theaters was proposed, and $20,000 was set aside for the project. Work on the foundation for the building began soon after. The board of trustees voted to tear down the existing Hospital and use its materials to help reduce the cost of constructing the new, larger building. Another doctor, Bertram L. Bryant, specializing in "pathology and bacteriology", was hired into the medical team as well.

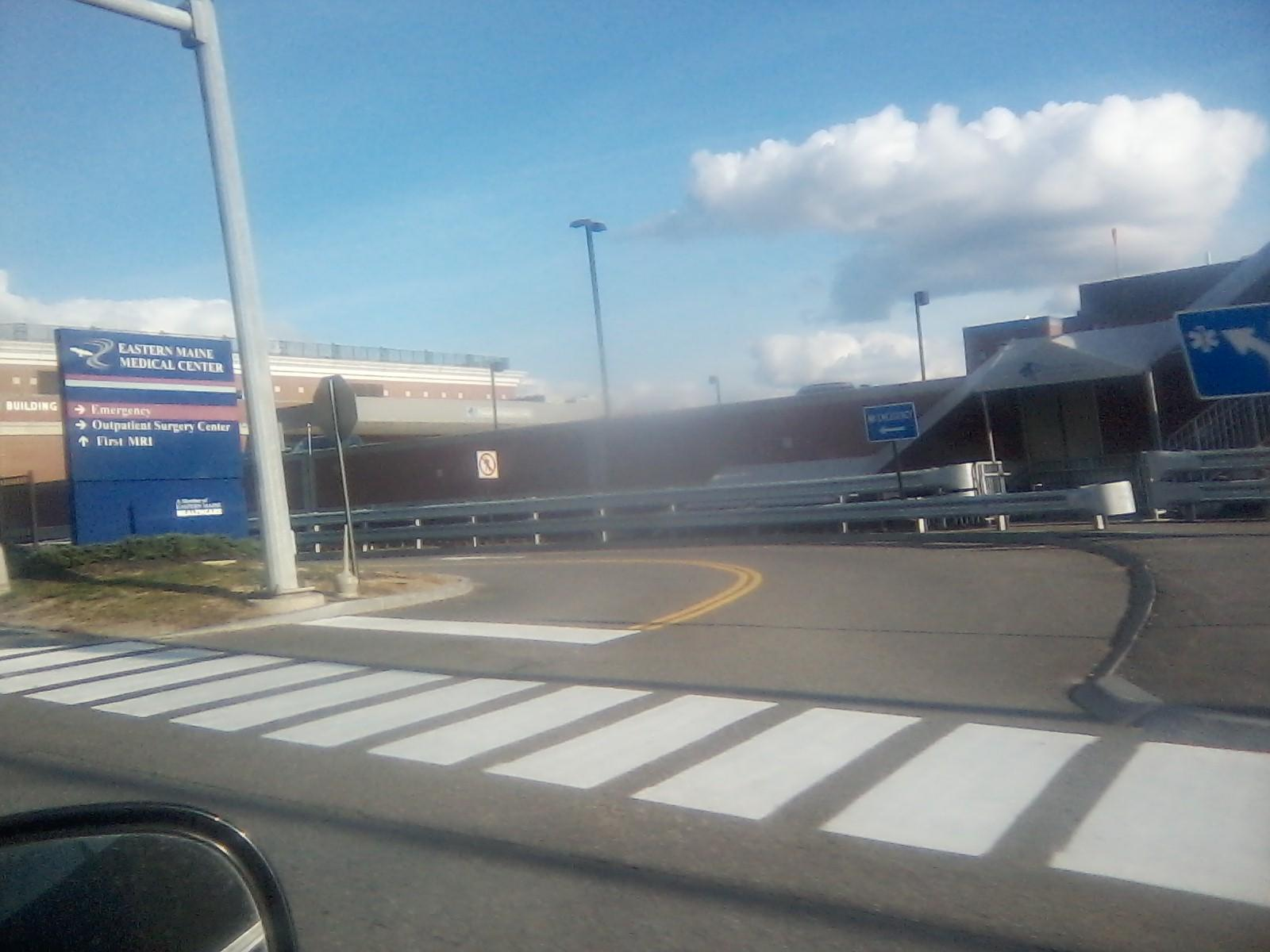
One of the three entrances to NLEMMC.

The new ward was opened in October 1899. Extra trolley cars had to be put into service in Bangor and Old Town to help transport the large crowds who came to take tours of the new facilities. The first interns were appointed soon after, in 1900. The hospital also purchased its first ambulance. There was a 50% increase in the number of admitted patients between 1900 and 1901, bringing the number of patients admitted in 1901 to 799. The same year, a separate building was constructed to house contagious disease patients. Overcrowding became a problem again.

In 1902, a children's ward was suggested, and in 1903 the hospital began to fundraise for its construction. The project was postponed in 1904 due to a typhoid fever outbreak. The 54-bed hospital housed 75 typhoid patients, who slept in linen closets and offices. Hospital physicians blame the outbreak on the city's drinking water supply, which was piped in from the Penobscot River.

Ellen Paine resigned from her position as hospital superintendent in 1906, and opened her own Paine Hospital. This hospital was later sold to the Felician Sisters and became St. Joseph's Hospital, which still exists. Ida Washburne, another Mass General employee, stepped up to take her place. Later, in 1907, the state legislature approved a grant of $15,000 to the hospital for the construction of a children's ward, provided that the hospital raise $25,000 on its own. Two private citizens donated the required $25,000 in 1908. Construction of the ward began in 1909, and the ward opened on January 1, 1910. The hospital also took the opportunity to install its first set of x-ray equipment.

=== 2012 expansion ===
In late 2012, the NLEMMC board of directors gave the final approval to a $287-million expansion project, to be taken on by Morris Switzer, a healthcare architecture firm. The expansion consists of a $247-million building-renovation-and-expansion project and a $40-million equipment upgrading project. The new building will allow the hospital to operate at its licensed capacity of 411 beds, as well as being home to expanded and upgraded neonatal care facilities, obstetrics, cardiac healthcare services, and new operating theaters.

=== Wal-Mart clinics ===
Northern Light Eastern Maine Medical Center and its parent company, Northern Light Health, collaborated with Aroostook Medical Center, Inland Hospital, Sebasticook Valley Health, and six Wal-Mart stores, to open up The Clinic at Wal-Marts inside the stores in 2009. The stores were located in Bangor, Brewer, Palmyra, Augusta, Waterville, and Presque Isle. The clinics were an attempt to improve rural access to healthcare. Healthcare at the Wal-Mart clinics was limited to simple health problems, such as colds; ear, nose, and throat issues; and minor burns. All of the clinics except the Waterville clinic were closed in 2011 due to low patient volume, and the clinic staff were reassigned to other positions within their respective health networks.

=== Post-pandemic ===
Due to lack of staff, NLEMMC's walk-in-care location reduced its hours in 2023.

== Criticism ==
=== 2002 bylaw changes ===
In June 2002, NLEMMC was criticized by its own doctors for proposing a change to its bylaws that would give the hospital the ability to discipline or fire doctors who said anything that could "undermine an individual's trust in a practitioner or the hospital." The executive director of the Maine Medical Association, Gordon Smith, stated that the bylaw was "really a gag order." The bylaw would have prevented doctors from addressing concerns they had with how the hospital is run. A similar issue had been raised a few years earlier banning criticism of HMO plans, but had been struck down.

=== 2010-2012 nursing strikes ===
In 2011, the hospital's Maine State Nurses Association member staff went on strike, complaining of issues with the hospital's nurse-to-patient ratio. The hospital has a track record of poor relationships with the nurse's union; nurses had previously threatened to strike in 2007 over the same issue, but the strike was called off two days after the strike warning had been issued to the hospital. The union threatened a strike in late 2010, again citing failed discussions regarding nurse-patient ratios and outdated health insurance coverage. The nurses took up a one-day picket near the hospital, the first nurses' strike in NLEMMC's history and creating public concern that the hospital would be understaffed during the strike. The Hospital responded by initiating a three-day lockout of its unionized nursing staff. Further controversy was generated when it was discovered that the hospital's recruiting service was seeking scabs on Craigslist.

=== Patient safety ===
In previous years, NLEMMC was "A"-rated by Leapfrog Group, indicating a low risk of patient injury from medical error. During the COVID-19 pandemic, this rating was dropped to a C. In 2022, NLEMMC was the only Maine hospital reviewed by Leapfrog Group to have not improved their score from pandemic lows.
