= Craig Hickman =

American politician (born 1967)

Member of the Maine Senate from the 14th district
- Incumbent
- Assumed office March 10, 2021
- Preceded by: Shenna Bellows

Member of the Maine House of Representatives from the 81st district
- In office December 5, 2012 – December 2, 2020
- Preceded by: Patrick Flood
- Succeeded by: Tavis Hasenfus

Personal details
- Born: December 8, 1967 (age 58) Madison, Wisconsin
- Party: Democratic
- Education: Harvard University
- Profession: Farmer; Author; Performance artist
- Website: Personal website

Craig V. Hickman (born December 8, 1967) is an American writer, farmer, and Democratic politician from Maine currently representing Maine Senate District 14. He served in the 126th Maine House of Representatives as the representative for Maine's 82nd district from 2012-2018. Hickman won his 2012 primary election by nearly 80%, and campaigned on ending hunger, eliminating regulations for small farms and businesses, and investing in sustainable energy initiatives. Hickman was elected to the Maine Senate in a 2021 special election, succeeding Shenna Bellows.

== Early life and career ==
Hickman was born in Madison, Wisconsin, on December 8, 1967. He is of African-American heritage. He attended high-school at Rufus King High School in Milwaukee, Wisconsin, where he was valedictorian. Hickman attended college at Harvard University, graduating in 1990 with a bachelor's degree in Government. He first ran for the Maine House in 2010, losing to incumbent Patrick Flood. In 2012 he won his primary election by a sizable margin, and then the general election on November 6, 2012, beating Republican Scott Davis 59%–41%. Two years later, in the midst of a Republican wave, Hickman won re-election against Republican Lee Fellman by a landslide margin, 65%-35%.

Hickman spoke about his farm and announced the delegates earned by Joe Biden and Bernie Sanders in the 2020 Maine Democratic presidential primary at the 2020 Democratic National Convention roll call.

== Personal life ==
Hickman currently lives in Winthrop, Maine, with his husband, Jop Blom. He is one of six openly gay members of the Maine Legislature, alongside Sen. Justin Chenette (D–Saco) and Reps. Matt Moonen (D–Portland), Ryan Fecteau (D–Biddeford), Lois Galgay Reckitt (D–South Portland) and Andrew McLean (D–Gorham).

He operates the 25-acre historic Annabessacook Farm Bed & Breakfast, where he regularly serves free meals to underprivileged citizens. Hickman also writes one of the top-ranked independent sports blogs on the internet, and is past President of the Winthrop Area Rotary Club.

Hickman was seriously burned on July 10, 2018 while attempting to light a brush pile on fire.

== Achievements ==
Hickman's book Fumbling Toward Divinity was a finalist in the Spirituality category at the 2006 Lambda Literary Awards. In addition, he has received a fellowship from the Massachusetts Cultural Council, a Gertrude Johnson Literary Award, the James Baldwin Award for Cultural Achievement, and a Spirit of America Foundation Award.

== Books ==
- 1993: The Language of Mirrors
- 1994: Rituals: Poetry and Prose
- 2005: Fumbling Toward Divinity
