= Carl Sheline =

Mayor of Lewiston, Maine, since 2022

Mayor of Lewiston, Maine
- Incumbent
- Assumed office January 3, 2022
- Preceded by: Mark Cayer

Personal details
- Party: Democratic
- Children: 2
- Occupation: Mayor, businessman
- Website: Official Website

Carl L. Sheline is an American politician and entrepreneur who has served as the mayor of Lewiston, Maine, since 2022. He was first elected in November 2021 and was re-elected for a second term in December 2023 following a runoff election. Sheline was the incumbent mayor during the 2023 Lewiston shootings, the deadliest mass shooting in Maine's history. In 2026, he gained attention for his vocal opposition to federal immigration enforcement operations within the city.

Though the office of Mayor of Lewiston is nonpartisan, Sheline is a member of the Democratic Party.

== Professional career ==
Sheline is an entrepreneur and businessman based in Lewiston. In 2016, he founded Munka, a coworking space located in downtown Lewiston on Lisbon Street. Prior to founding Munka, he worked as an office manager for a multi-site healthcare organization in Maine.

Sheline has served on the boards of several local and state organizations, including the Lewiston Auburn Metropolitan Chamber of Commerce, the Maine Music Society, the Central Maine Community College Foundation, and the Young Professionals of Lewiston Auburn Association.

== Political career ==
=== 2021 Election ===
Sheline ran for Mayor of Lewiston in 2021. The mayoral seat is non-partisan. He campaigned on issues including economic development, infrastructure, and addressing substance use. In the November 2021 election, he defeated opponent Donna Gillespie to succeed outgoing mayor Mark Cayer.

=== First term (2022–2024) ===
During his first term, Sheline established several ad hoc committees to address city issues, including the Ad Hoc Shelter Committee, and the Ad Hoc Committee on Substance Use & Recovery.

His tenure involved political friction with the Lewiston City Council. In 2023, the City Council voted to censure Sheline regarding a letter he wrote supporting the expansion of "Project Home," a housing initiative. The council and mayor clashed on approaches to homelessness, with Sheline advocating for a new shelter and increased services, while conservative members of the council opposed specific shelter proposals.

=== Response to 2023 mass shootings ===
Sheline was mayor on October 25, 2023, when a gunman killed 18 people and injured 13 others at a bowling alley and a bar in Lewiston. The event is the deadliest mass shooting in Maine's history, the deadliest mass shooting of 2023, and the tenth-deadliest in the history of the United States.

In the immediate aftermath, Sheline became the primary spokesperson for the city, appearing in interviews with major national outlets. He issued emergency statements urging residents to shelter in place during the two-day manhunt for the suspect. Sheline stated he was "heartbroken" and "completely broken" by the tragedy, but emphasized the city's resilience, remarking, "Lewiston is known for our strength and our grit and we will need both in the days to come."

He presided over city-wide vigils and ceremonies honoring the first responders, hospital staff, and agencies that responded to the shooting.

=== 2023 re-election ===
In the November 2023 general election, Sheline faced former Republican state representative Jon Connor. Because no candidate received a majority of the vote, a runoff election was held in December 2023. On December 12, 2023, Sheline won the runoff election with 51.3% of the vote against Connor's 48.7%, securing a second term. The final result was 2,391 votes to 2,269 votes.

=== Response to "Operation Catch of the Day" (2026) ===
In January 2026, the U.S. Department of Homeland Security (DHS) and Immigration and Customs Enforcement (ICE) launched a targeted enforcement surge in Maine dubbed "Operation Catch of the Day." The operation resulted in approximately 50 arrests across the state, with federal officials stating they were targeting "the worst of the worst" criminal offenders.

Following the onset of the operation, Sheline emerged as the city's principal spokesperson, participating in interviews with national media outlets. Sheline became a vocal critic of the operation's tactics within Lewiston, publicly condemning the federal agency's approach, describing the agents as "masked men with no regard for the rule of law" and characterizing their presence as "terror and intimidation tactics."

In statements to the press, Sheline reported that the operation had created a climate of fear that affected daily life and local businesses, noting that the city's streets were "unusually quiet." He publicly disputed the necessity of the paramilitary style of the raids, stating, "Lewiston stands for the dignity of all the people who call Maine home. We will never stop caring for our neighbors." His opposition placed him alongside other Maine officials, including Portland Mayor Mark Dion and Governor Janet Mills, who also raised concerns about the lack of communication from federal agencies regarding the operation. He participated in protests attended by over a thousand people in response.

== Personal life ==
Sheline has lived in Lewiston for over a decade. He has two children.
