= Maine AFL–CIO =

Labor union in Maine

- Founded: October 31, 1891
- Headquarters: Augusta, Maine
- Location: United States
- Members: 36,000
- Key people: Cynthia Phinney, President
- Affiliations: AFL–CIO
- Website: www.maineaflcio.org

The Maine AFL–CIO is a federation of AFL–CIO-affiliated labor unions in the state of Maine.

The federation lobbies the state legislature and executive branch on issues important to its members, assists its state and local affiliate unions in organizing new members, conducts training and educational programs, and conducts research into labor-related issues such as workplace health and safety, health care, wages and benefits and more.

The Maine AFL–CIO also sponsors the Maine Women's Labor Institute, which trains working women in how to become more effective union leaders and political activists.

== Governance ==
Membership in the Maine AFL–CIO is open to all member unions of the AFL–CIO. The membership meets in a general convention in odd-numbered years. The organization is governed by three executive officers (a president, vice-president and secretary-treasurer), and a 26-member board of directors. Four directors represent central labor councils, one represents the Retiree division, and one represents the Maine Women's Labor Institute. Delegates to the biennial convention elect the officers and directors, whose terms of office are for two years.

=== Leadership ===
The Maine AFL–CIO has had enormously stable leadership in the 20th century. From 1937 to 1979, the federation was led by president Benjamin Dorsky.

After Dorsky's death in 1979, Charles O'Leary, then director of the Bureau of Labor Education at the University of Maine at Orono, defeated Maine AFL–CIO vice-president Marvin Ewing, 75 percent to 25 percent, in the election for a new president.

In January 1999, O'Leary retired. Gwendolyn Gatcomb, the federation's vice-president since 1974, was elected his successor. Gatcomb became the first woman to lead the Maine AFL–CIO.

Gatcomb declined to seek election in the regularly scheduled election in August 1999. Edward Gorham, Maine AFL–CIO secretary-treasurer since 1977, was elected president. He retired in late 2009 after serving the Maine labor movement for over 40 years and the Maine AFL–CIO for over 35 years. The current president is Cynthia Phinney.

- 1937–1979: Benjamin Dorsky
- 1979–1999: Chick O'Leary
- 1999: Gwndolyn Gatcomb
- 1999–2009: Edward Gorham
- 2009–2015: Don Berry
- 2015–present: Cynthia Phinney

== Politics ==
The Maine AFL–CIO is heavily involved in state and federal politics. It is recognized as a potent lobby in the state legislature. It is also influential in federal politics. The federation provided a critical early endorsement to Rep. Michael Michaud (D-Maine) in his 2002 race for election to Congress. On June 22, 2010 it endorsed Libby Mitchell for governor of Maine.

== Membership losses ==
The Maine AFL–CIO has seen its membership decline significantly in recent years.

The Maine AFL–CIO is dominated by unions in blue-collar industries and state government. Since 1994, the state's largest employers—shipbuilders and paper mills—have shed nearly 4,500 workers, and job losses continue due to defense budget cuts. Due to these trends, membership in the federation dropped from 84,000 members in 1999 to 63,700 in 2005 (of which only about 50,000 were dues-paying union members).

In 2006, the Maine AFL–CIO lost another 14,000 members when unions with the Change to Win Federation disaffiliated in the wake of the formation of the rival organization. Nearly 10,000 these members belonged to the Maine State Employees Association, an affiliate of the Service Employees International Union, which represents employees in Maine's state government.
