= Maine State Nurses Association =

American organization and trade union

The Maine State Nurses Association (MSNA) is a professional organization and trade union of registered nurses in the U.S. state of Maine. It is an affiliate of National Nurses United.

== History ==
The MSNA was incorporated on December 10, 1914. Edith Soule, Superintendent of the Children's Hospital in Portland, was its first president. One of the organization's first acts was to support a bill for the registration and professionalization of nurses, which passed the Maine Legislature in 1915. It formed its first collective bargaining unit at Eastern Maine Medical Center in the 1970s.

The organization was initially affiliated with the American Nurses Association. MSNA is now affiliated with National Nurses Organizing Committee and National Nurses United, the largest union for registered nurses in the United States, representing 225,000 nurses across the country. MSNA/NNOC/NNU represents about 4,000 nurses and other caregivers from Portland to Fort Kent, including the nurses at Maine Medical Center in Portland.

== Political activity ==
In 2025, the MSNA endorsed two candidates running in contested Democratic primaries: Former state senator Troy Jackson, a 2026 gubernatorial candidate, and oyster farmer Graham Platner, a 2026 U.S. Senate candidate.
