= Maine Service Employees Association =

The Maine Service Employees Association (MSEA, formerly Maine State Employees Association) is a public-sector trade union in the U.S. state of Maine. MSEA has been part of the Service Employees International Union (SEIU Local 1989) since 1988, although it formed earlier. Its newspaper is called the Maine Stater. In 2020, MSEA SEIU 1989 voted to change their name from "Maine State Employees Association" to "Maine Service Employees Association."

As of 2025, MSEA represents about 10,000 workers in four Maine state government bargaining units: Administrative services; operations, maintenance, and support services; professional-technical services; and supervisory services. Based on total membership, it is the largest labor union for state employees.

In November 2025, MSEA filed a complaint with the Maine Labor Relations Board against Governor Janet Mills' administration, accusing the Mills administration of bad-faith bargaining in executive branch contract negotiations. The union claimed the administration's violations include prematurely declaring impasse, regressive bargaining, and otherwise engaging in behavior designed to frustrate the collective bargaining process.

== See also ==
- Locke v. Karass
