= 2025 Maine referendums =

Two referendum questions were placed on the statewide ballot for Maine on November 4, 2025. Both were citizen-initiated proposals that the Maine Legislature declined to pass itself.

- Election law changes: This proposal sought to implement changes to election laws in Maine, including requiring a photo ID to obtain a ballot, a reduction in days for absentee voting, banning prepaid postage for absentee ballots, banning requests for absentee ballots by phone, limiting municipalities to one ballot drop box per municipality, and requiring teams of partisan officials to retrieve ballots from drop boxes, among other changes. The proposal was defeated.
- Red flag law proposal: This proposal sought to implement a red flag law in Maine, allowing family members or law enforcement to ask a judge to remove firearms from an individual shown to be a threat to others. This would add to, but not replace, the "yellow flag" law already in place in Maine, which allows the seizure of firearms only at the request of law enforcement, and only after the subject is in custody and had a mental health evaluation. The proposal was passed.
