= Republican Party efforts to disrupt voting after the 2024 United States presidential election =

Following the 2024 United States presidential election, Republican Party officials took a variety of actions at the state and national level that target election infrastructure, including voting rights and election security.

== Second Trump administration ==
The second Trump administration has issued executive orders and other presidential directives instituting federal department and agency actions that have impacted election administration by state governments, federal election security and campaign finance agencies, and offices within the U.S. Justice Department for enforcing voting rights protections. The administration's actions on election law and voting rights have occurred alongside the administration's targeting of political opponents and Republican Party efforts to disrupt voting after the 2024 presidential election. Election lawyers at the Brennan Center for Justice and Democracy Docket have described the administration's actions as election subversion, while surveys of U.S. political scientists conducted after Trump returned to office have found a consensus that the United States is transitioning towards illiberal democracy and competitive authoritarianism.

== Congress ==
=== Safeguard American Voter Eligibility Act ===
On January 3, 2025, Republican representative Chip Roy reintroduced the Safeguard American Voter Eligibility Act (SAVE Act), which proposes to amend the National Voter Registration Act such that anyone who applies to register to vote in federal elections (or who updates their existing voter registration) must submit proof of citizenship. This proposal has been criticized by voting rights activists for potentially disenfranchising voters, such as approximately 69 million married women, any eligible voter who changes their name (such as for gender identity transition), and approximately 10% of voters who do not have immediate, if any, access to documents to prove their citizenship such as naturalized citizens, Native Americans and those with low income. The legislation had passed the United States House of Representatives on April 9, 220-208.

=== Proving Residency for Overseas Voter Eligibility Act ===
In August 2025, Representative Abe Hamadeh and four other Republicans proposed the Proving Residency for Overseas Voter Eligibility Act (PROVE Act), which would mandate overseas U.S. voters or their spouse, parent or guardian to have a "current residence" in the state in which they register. Otherwise, they would register in Washington, D.C. for voting in federal elections.

== State and local government actions ==
=== Alabama ===
In December 2023, the NAACP, Greater Birmingham Ministries, and Black voters in Montgomery, Alabama filed a lawsuit against Republican Alabama Secretary of State Wes Allen, arguing that five Alabama State Senate districts in Montgomery and Huntsville, Alabama unfairly split the Black voting population in those regions. The ACLU and Southern Poverty Law Center also joined the lawsuit. In August 2025, federal judge Anna M. Manasco ruled that Alabama could not use the current map could not be used for a state Senate election, stating that the Montgomery districts violated Section 2 of the Voting Rights Act, but that the Huntsville districts did not. Allen planned to file an appeal and to ask for the U.S. District Court for the Northern District of Alabama to hold further judgment until Louisiana v. Callais was decided by the Supreme Court.

=== Alaska ===
In April 2025, 11 American Samoans in Whittier, Alaska were charged by the state of Alaska with lying about U.S. citizenship and voter fraud. These charges were brought by Treg Taylor, the then-Republican Attorney General of Alaska. American Samoans do not have automatic U.S. citizenship and are instead U.S. nationals, so they do not have the right to vote in most elections or hold public office. One of the people charged said that she was told by election workers to check a box that she was a citizen, as there was no identification system for U.S. nationals. A defendant attorney says that many of those charged are citizens. Due to their status as U.S. nationals and aspects of Alaska state law, the eligibility of American Samoans to vote has been described as "confusing" and "contradictory".

=== California ===
In April 2025, Clint Curtis was appointed as the county clerk and registrar of voters in Shasta County, California. Curtis is connected to Mike Lindell, Steve Bannon, and Michael Flynn; spread false claims of fraud during the 2020 election, and is registered as a Republican. The next month, Curtis fired the assistant county registrar of voters, a decision that was criticized across the political spectrum due to her extensive election experience.

Curtis initially planned to relocate the county election services to an unused retail building and add dozens of cameras to livestream ballot counting, but the Shasta County Board of Supervisors did not vote on his plan, rejecting it in effect. The California Secretary of State office warned that recording the ballot process risked voter privacy and election security.

Curtis supported voter identification requirements; promoted a secession movement; hired secessionists and members of the election denial movement; reduced the number of ballot drop boxes; supported replacing voting machines with paper ballots and universal hand counts, which voting activists criticized as vulnerable to errors; falsely accused the previous assistant registrar of election fraud; and blocked a local news outlet.

=== Georgia ===
In September 2025, the Georgia Republican Party submitted a series of proposals to an election study committee, led by Republicans, in the Georgia state legislature. These proposals included ending early voting, absentee ballots, and automatic voter registration.

==== Voter roll purges ====
In July 2025, Georgia Secretary of State Brad Raffensperger announced plans to send cancellation notices to 477,883 registered voters who did not vote in 2022 or 2024. He later announced that his office would warn 218,951 registered voters who have not voted since 2019. He sent a letter to Congress urging them to update the National Voter Registration Act based on Georgia's election maintenance policies. He also lobbied for voter ID and forbidding ballot harvesting. Fair Fight Action accused Raffensperger's policies of being "voter suppression by administrative process" and launched a tool to help voters lookup if they are on the list to be purged.

==== Fulton County ====
In May 2025, the Democratic majority of the Fulton County, Georgia Board of Commissioners voted against approving Julie Adams and Jason Frazier, who were nominated by the Fulton County Republican Party, disqualifying them due to their past actions. Adams refused to certify the 2024 primary elections and Frazier challenged thousands of voters in the county. The county GOP party sued to pressure the board to accept their nominees. The judge in the case supported the Republican Party's stance and ordered the board to appoint the two. When the board did not, the judge held the board in contempt and ordered them to pay a fine of $10,000 per day to the state, as well as the county GOP's legal fees, until they complied. This fine was put on hold while the board appealed.

=== Illinois ===
In 2022, Mike Bost and two federal electors filed a lawsuit against the Illinois State Board of Elections, alleging that a state law, which allowed for the counting of mail-in ballots up to 14 days after an election, had violated federal law. Judicial Watch represented Bost in the case. In June 2025, the Supreme Court agreed to hear the case during their next term starting in October 2025.

=== Louisiana ===
In May 2025, Louisiana Secretary of State Nancy Landry announced that the state would use a voter maintenance database from DOGE, which also included immigration status and death records information.

=== Maine ===
During the 2025 Maine referendums, the Question 1 proposal, if implemented, would have mandated voter identification and significantly reduced absentee voting and ballot drop boxes. The initiative was supported by Dinner Table PAC, which promoted it by raising over $600,000, which was primarily donated by the Republican State Leadership Committee.

=== Missouri ===
In 2025, the Missouri General Assembly used the previous question procedure to overturn two citizen initiatives that were passed during the 2024 election: one regarding mandatory paid sick leave and the other on abortion access. Republican members of the Freedom Caucus also expressed interest in reforming the citizen's initiative process, stating that they wanted to increase the difficulty of amending the Missouri state constitution.

In October 2025, after about 100,000 signatures were gathered for a referendum to oppose redistricting in Missouri, Republican Missouri Secretary of State Denny Hoskins announced that signatures gathered before he approved the referendum were invalid, and that attempting to count them would be illegal. Republican Missouri Attorney General Catherine Hanaway also submitted a lawsuit in federal court claiming that a referendum should not apply to Missouri's redistricting proposal. St. Louis Public Radio noted that Hanaway's lawsuit could affect similar referendums in Utah and California.

=== New York ===
In the aftermath of the Republican primary in District 47 during the 2025 New York City Council election, at least seven potentially fraudulent ballots were found, three from dead voters and four who never previously voted in local primary elections. An additional 22 uncounted ballots were found from one district that, according to a lawyer for candidate Richie Barsamian, were all for Barsamian, the chairman of the Kings County GOP. The number of ballots that were possibly fraudulent was reportedly larger than the margin of victory.

In April 2025, Petros Krommidas, a Democratic candidate for the Nassau County Legislature in the 2025 Nassau County, New York legislature elections, disappeared at sea and is presumed dead by family, friends and colleagues. Nassau County Democrats attempted to replace him with a different candidate. In response, two Republican voters filed a lawsuit to prevent Krommidas from being replaced, claiming that he was only missing and not legally dead. A state judge sided with the plaintiffs and ordered for local election officials to keep Krommidas' name on the ballot. Democratic officials described these efforts as "cruel" and "heartless".

=== North Carolina ===
In April 2025, the North Carolina Court of Appeals issued an anonymous ruling that Republican North Carolina State Auditor Dave Boliek was allowed to control the North Carolina State Board of Elections, removing power from the Democratic governor Josh Stein. This decision – which had only two sentences and did not include an explanation – would result in both the state and county boards of elections having a Republican majority. Stein speculated that this ruling was part of an attempt to overturn the 2024 North Carolina Supreme Court election. This change was made possible by the state Republican Party organizing a legislative session shortly after the 2024 election with the stated purpose of passing a bill for hurricane relief. Boliek would then appoint to the board the former president of the Civitas Institute, Francis De Luca, and former Republican state Senator Bob Rucho. In May 2025, the board then fired the executive director and replaced her with Sam Hayes, the general counsel to the Republican speaker of the North Carolina House, Destin Hall. Boliek also replaced the county election boards with 3-2 Democratic majorities with 3-2 Republican majorities.

In September 2025, Dallas Woodhouse, the former executive director of the North Carolina Republican Party, was appointed by Boliek to oversee all North Carolina county election boards. The appointment was announced in private and the role, election oversight liaison, was just established. In 2016, Woodhouse told members of county election boards to "make party line changes to early voting", including reducing hours at polling locations and removing polling locations at colleges. Woodhouse previously worked for American Majority, whose goal WRAL described as "to help Republicans and hurt Democrats in elections."

Also in September 2025, Democracy Docket reported that Hayes wrote to the North Carolina Division of Motor Vehicles to ask for full Social Security numbers to match to registered voters.

In April 2025, the North Carolina Supreme Court ruled that overseas non-resident voters registered in North Carolina can only vote in federal elections, not local or state elections. Republican state representative Hugh Blackwell introduced a bill that officially stated would formalize the position of the North Carolina State Board of Elections regarding overseas voting. However, voting rights advocates expressed concern that it would remove the right to vote of overseas non-resident voters in the state.

=== Ohio ===
In February 2025, Ohio Secretary of State Frank LaRose published an online portal of daily database snapshots of Ohio voter rolls. The president of the League of Women Voters in Ohio expressed concerns about voter privacy and that these snapshots may be used by conservative voting activist groups who have previously filed challenges in what she described as an attempt at voter suppression.

In April 2025, the Ohio House of Representatives passed a budget bill that proposed replacing elections for coroners with appointments by county boards of commissioners. Several Ohio coroners expressed concern that they were not previously consulted, that there was no debate, and that appointed coroners risked losing independence and becoming politicized.

=== Oklahoma ===
In May 2025, Ryan Walters, the Oklahoma Superintendent of Public Instruction announced a new policy for academic social studies in K-12 public schools to include false claims of electoral fraud related to the 2020 United States presidential election as part of the curriculum. Walter had appointed Kevin Roberts of the Heritage Foundation and Dennis Prager to revise these new standards.

=== Texas ===
In May 2025, Texas attorney general Ken Paxton charged six people with "vote harvesting", including a county executive, a county elections worker, a school board trustee, and two City Council members. In 2021, the Texas Legislature prohibited ballot collection in a large amount or in exchange for payment, deeming such practices as "vote harvesting services". The Republican Party historically has attempted to reduce the use of intermediaries for voting in elections, but others argued that some voters may need third parties to turn in their ballots. The League of United Latin American Citizens has criticized the charges as "voter suppression 101" and accused Paxton of targeting Hispanic and Democratic voters. In July 2025, nine Latino Democratic Party political officials and operatives were indicted by Audrey Gossett Louis, a Republican district attorney who worked with Paxton, with the latter charging the nine with "ballot harvesting".

In September 2025, the Republican Party of Texas (RPT) sued the state of Texas in federal court, asking to change its primaries from being open (where residents can vote in either Democratic or Republican primary elections, but not both) to closed (where only registered Republicans can vote). The RPT claimed that open primaries "violates [its] First Amendment rights" and accused Democratic or independent voters of voting in the Republican primary elections to oppose the candidates that the RPT preferred to win.

One of the proposed amendments during the 2025 Texas constitutional amendment election asked voters whether the Texas state constitution should clarify that non-citizens are not allowed to vote. Voting by non-citizens is already prohibited by both state and federal law. Civil rights activists criticized the measure as promoting discrimination and discouraging legal voting.

==== Tarrant County ====
In April 2025, the Republican-led Tarrant County Commissioners Court voted to work with the Public Interest Legal Foundation, which would advise the county for rewriting district borders. Tim O'Hare is the leader of this process as of June 2025. A Southern Methodist University researcher used Markov chain analysis on the proposed district maps and determined that they dilute the voting power of Black voters. This effort was opposed by two Democratic commissioners, ten Tarrant County mayors, and Representative Marc Veasey. The map was approved by the commission, and the county and O'Hare were sued, claiming that the map racially discriminates and violates both the Voting Rights Act and the United States Constitution. Redistricting critics alleged that the map would increase the likelihood that the Democratic-leaning precincts would become Republican-controlled. O'Hare responded, "Tarrant County is alive and well in terms of being a red county and we intend to keep it that way." In August 2025, the county filed a motion to dismiss the lawsuit, claiming a lack of jurisdiction by the court, no protection under the Voting Rights Act, and no evidence of racial discrimination.

In August 2025, commissioners voted to reduce the number of Election Day polling sites from 331 to 216, and to close several early voting sites, claiming that such a move was intended to save money for non-presidential elections with lower turnouts. Critics of the vote alleged that voter suppression of Black, Hispanic, and college-aged voters. A Texas law passed in May 2025 reduced the minimum number of Election Day voting sites in Tarrant County from 347 to 212. Also in August 2025, the Tarrant County Commissioners Court voted to reduce meetings from twice a month to once a month, a change that was criticized by meeting attendees as "undemocratic".

=== Wyoming ===
In August 2025, Wyoming Secretary of State Chuck Gray announced his support for Trump's statements on mail-in ballots and voting machines. Gray said that he presented a draft bill to the Wyoming Legislature that mandated paper ballots, and that this bill was advanced for the 2026 Legislative Session.

=== Efforts in multiple states ===
==== Redistricting ====
As of October 2025, Republicans have implemented redistricting initiatives in Texas, Missouri, and North Carolina, (totaling seven new Republican leaning seats in the House of Representatives) and have proposed initiatives in Ohio, Florida, Indiana, Kansas, Nebraska, New Hampshire, and Utah. Trump has pressured Republican politicians across the country to participate in redistricting, with Trump associates threatening primary challenges against Republican officials who did not comply. Trump believed that redistricting (alongside ending mail-in voting) would give the Republican Party an additional 100-seat majority in the House of Representatives. Political analysts warned that this redistricting could lead to the Republican Party controlling the House for decades.

==== Proof-of-citizenship ====
Several laws attempting to require proof-of-citizenship for voting were introduced in 2025, including in Texas and Florida.

==== Appointment of election deniers to local election boards ====
Since the 2024 elections, election deniers have been working in local boards of elections and elections offices across the United States, including in Georgia and Arizona. Some of the election deniers have ties to the Election Integrity Network.

==== Voting restrictions ====
According to Voting Rights Lab, between January and August of 2025, 35 laws were passed in 19 states for restricting voting rights or disrupting the running of elections.

==== False voter fraud allegations ====
Republican Attorneys General and Secretaries of State in states such as Alaska, Idaho, Ohio and Louisiana have made announcements of dozens or hundreds of potential cases of fraudulent voting or voter registration, some of which have been recommended for prosecution. However, Democracy Docket reported that research has consistently shown that non-citizen voting is rare and has not affected the results of federal elections. Voting and policy experts expressed concern about the sensationalist nature of these announcements, that mistakes are treated as fraudulent, and that the prosecutions are meant as a chilling effect to prevent people from voting.

== Non-governmental actions ==
=== Republican National Committee ===
In March 2025, the Dhillon Law Group, on behalf of the Republican National Committee (RNC) sent public records requests to 48 states and Washington, D.C. for detailed information about voter lists, including the names of voters who were previously removed.

In June 2025, the RNC and Arizona Republican Party sued to block an Arizona law that permitted overseas ballot casting without direct proof of citizenship. An RNC spokesperson said, "RNC lawsuits are absolutely part of our strategy heading into the midterms."

=== Lawsuit against Ann Selzer ===
Shortly after the 2024 election, Trump filed a lawsuit against The Des Moines Register and pollster Ann Selzer, who had previously inaccurately predicted a Trump loss in the state of Iowa that year. He accused the newspaper of "deceptive polls" that "[poisoned] the electorate" and both defendants of "consumer fraud" and "election interference" to "deceive voters". Republican Iowa politicians Mariannette Miller-Meeks and Brad Zaun joined the lawsuit in January 2025. On January 7, 2025, the Foundation for Individual Rights and Expression (FIRE) announced that it would defend Selzer in the lawsuit, calling the lawsuit "the very definition of a 'SLAPP' suit — a Strategic Lawsuit Against Public Participation."

Zaun and Miller-Meeks were dismissed from the case in May 2025. In June 2025, Trump asked for the court case to be move back to Iowa state court, which was not granted by a federal judge. At the end of the month, Trump requested to dismiss the federal lawsuit and then refiled it in Iowa state court several hours later. By doing so, the lawsuit would not be affected by an Iowa state law against SLAPP cases. The request to dismiss the federal lawsuit was denied, with the judge ruling the request as "procedurally improper". In July, Selzer and Gannett, the parent company of The Des Moines Register who was also sued, filed to pause the state case. Selzer's lawyers asked for Trump to cover her legal fees if she won.

=== 76 Group ===
Jeff Small, a political consultant for the 76 Group who was previously the chief of staff for Lauren Boebert, contacted Republican election officials in Colorado, claiming that he was working with the White House, asked those officials if they would be willing to work with a third party to review voting machines. All 10 clerks that he contacted, who used equipment from Dominion Voting Systems, had refused his request. For one county, Small asked who was the county's project manager at Dominion between 2020 and 2021.

=== Cleta Mitchell ===
In September 2025, Cleta Mitchell expressed support for a "Super SAVE Act" that would formalize efforts by the DHS to analyze state voter rolls for finding non-citizens. Earlier that month, she expressed her belief that Trump would declare a national emergency to take over federal elections.

=== Scott Leiendecker and Liberty Vote ===
In October 2025, Scott Leiendecker, the former Republican election director of St. Louis, purchased Dominion Voting Systems through his company Liberty Vote for an unknown amount. KnowInk, his previous voting system company, and Dominion would both be rebranded to Liberty Vote. Leiendecker "is the sole owner [of Liberty Vote] and he privately financed" the purchase. Several election workers, government officials and others in the election security community have said that they received little to no prior notice of the purchase. With purchasing Dominion, Leiendecker controls election equipment in at least 29 states. 14 of these states use equipment from both Dominion and KnowInk, giving him control of the full election process.

Liberty Vote planned to comply with Trump's March 2025 executive order on election security, and expressed interest in paper ballots, third party audits, and reviewing Dominion voting equipment prior to the 2026 elections, stating that they would "rebuild or retire" voting machines as necessary. Election officials have said that paper ballots would increase wait times and not security, and over 98% of American voters (all states except Louisiana) live in areas with paper trails. Election officials have warned that there is not enough time before the 2026 elections to test and certify new election equipment.

Liberty Vote is represented by the conservative-leaning Logan Circle Group, a public relations firm run by Trump associates that represented Matt Gaetz during allegations of child sex trafficking.

=== America First Legal Foundation ===
In July 2025, the America First Legal Foundation petitioned the Election Assistance Commission to mandate proof of U.S. citizenship for voter registration in federal elections on the federal voter registration form. By October 2025, 14 attorneys general, nine Republican Senators and 12 Representatives also supported the petition. The Associated Press described the effort as "the latest attempt by conservatives to push a nationwide proof-of-citizenship requirement while raising the specter of noncitizen voting as a significant problem, when it fact it is extremely rare."

=== National Republican Senatorial Committee ===
For the United States Supreme Court case National Republican Senatorial Committee v. FEC, Solicitor General John Sauer in May 2025 refused to defend current campaign finance law limiting coordinated spending and suggested that the Supreme Court should overturn it. The FEC is currently forbidden from bringing its case at the Supreme Court.

== Reactions ==
=== Accusations of intending to cancel the 2026 elections ===
James Carville, Chris Murphy and Gavin Newsom have claimed that the 2026 elections may be cancelled. However, no bona fide evidence indicates that the 2026 elections will be canceled.

== See also ==
- Efforts to overturn the 2020 United States presidential election
- Republican efforts to restrict voting following the 2020 presidential election
- Republican Party efforts to disrupt the 2024 United States presidential election
- Project 2025
- Department of Government Efficiency
- 2024 North Carolina Supreme Court election
- 2025 Wisconsin Supreme Court election
- National Republican Senatorial Committee v. FEC
- Ranked-choice voting in the United States
- Election subversion
