= Gunshot wound =

Injury caused by a bullet

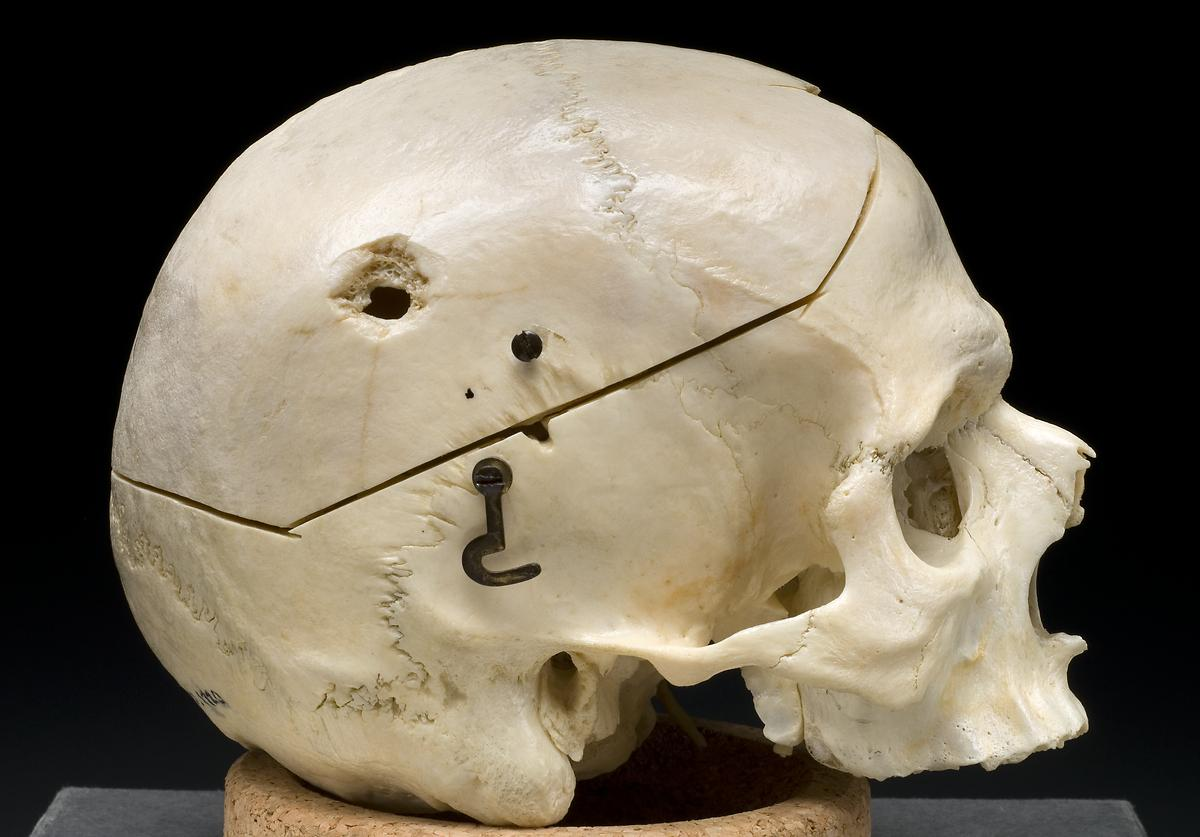
- Male skull showing bullet exit wound on parietal bone
- Specialty: Emergency medicine, trauma surgery
- Symptoms: Pain, deformity, bleeding
- Complications: PTSD, lead poisoning, hypovolemic shock, nerve injury, wound infection, sepsis, brain damage, gangrene, disability, amputation
- Causes: Guns
- Risk factors: Illegal drug trade, ignorance of firearm safety, substance misuse, alcohol abuse, poor mental health, firearm laws, social and economic differences, some occupations, suicide attempt, war
- Prevention: Firearm safety, crime prevention
- Treatment: Trauma care
- Frequency: 1 million (interpersonal violence in 2015)
- Deaths: 251,000 (2016)

A gunshot wound (GSW) is a penetrating injury caused by a projectile (e.g., a bullet) shot from a gun. Damage may include bleeding, bone fractures, organ damage, wound infection, and loss of the ability to move part of the body. Damage depends on the part of the body hit, the path the bullet follows through (or into) the body, and the type and speed of the bullet, and can be fatal. Long-term complications can include bowel obstruction, failure to thrive, neurogenic bladder and paralysis, recurrent cardiorespiratory distress and pneumothorax, hypoxic brain injury leading to early dementia, amputations, chronic pain and pain with light touch (hyperalgesia), deep venous thrombosis with pulmonary embolus, limb swelling and debility, and lead poisoning.

Factors that determine rates of gun violence vary by country. These factors may include the illegal drug trade, easy access to firearms, substance misuse including alcohol, mental health problems, firearm laws, social attitudes, economic differences, and occupations such as being a police officer. Where guns are more common, altercations more often end in death; however, firearm laws, particularly background checks and permit to purchase, can decrease this risk. Safer firearm storage may decrease the risk of firearm-related deaths in children.

Before management begins, the area must be verified as safe. This is followed by stopping major bleeding, then assessing and supporting the airway, breathing, and circulation.

In 2015, about a million gunshot wounds occurred from interpersonal violence. In 2016, firearms resulted in 251,000 deaths globally, up from 209,000 in 1990. Of these deaths, 161,000 (64%) were the result of assault, 67,500 (27%) were the result of suicide, and 23,000 (9%) were accidents. In the United States, guns resulted in about 40,000 deaths in 2017. Firearm-related deaths are most common in males between the ages of 20 and 24 years. Economic costs due to gunshot wounds have been estimated at $140 billion a year in the United States.

== Signs and symptoms ==
Trauma from a gunshot wound varies widely based on the bullet, velocity, mass, entry point, trajectory, affected anatomy, and exit point. Gunshot wounds can be particularly devastating compared to other penetrating injuries because the trajectory and fragmentation of bullets can be unpredictable after entry. Moreover, gunshot wounds typically involve a large degree of nearby tissue disruption and destruction caused by the physical effects of the projectile correlated with the bullet velocity classification.

The immediate damaging effect of a gunshot wound is typically severe bleeding with the potential for a type of shock known as hypovolemic shock, a condition characterized by inadequate delivery of oxygen to vital organs. In the case of traumatic hypovolemic shock, this failure of adequate oxygen delivery is due to blood loss, as blood is the means of delivering oxygen to the body's constituent parts. Besides blood loss, internal bleeding can lead to complications.

Devastating effects can result when a bullet strikes a vital organ such as the heart, lungs, or liver, or damages a component of the central nervous system such as the spinal cord or brain. This can commonly lead to organ failure, and subsequently death.

Common causes of death following gunshot injury include bleeding, low oxygen caused by pneumothorax, catastrophic injury to the heart and major blood vessels, and damage to the brain or central nervous system. Non-fatal gunshot wounds frequently have mild to severe long-lasting effects, typically some form of major disfigurement such as amputation because of a severe bone fracture and may cause permanent disability. A sudden blood gush may take effect immediately from a gunshot wound if a bullet directly damages larger blood vessels, especially arteries.

== Pathophysiology ==
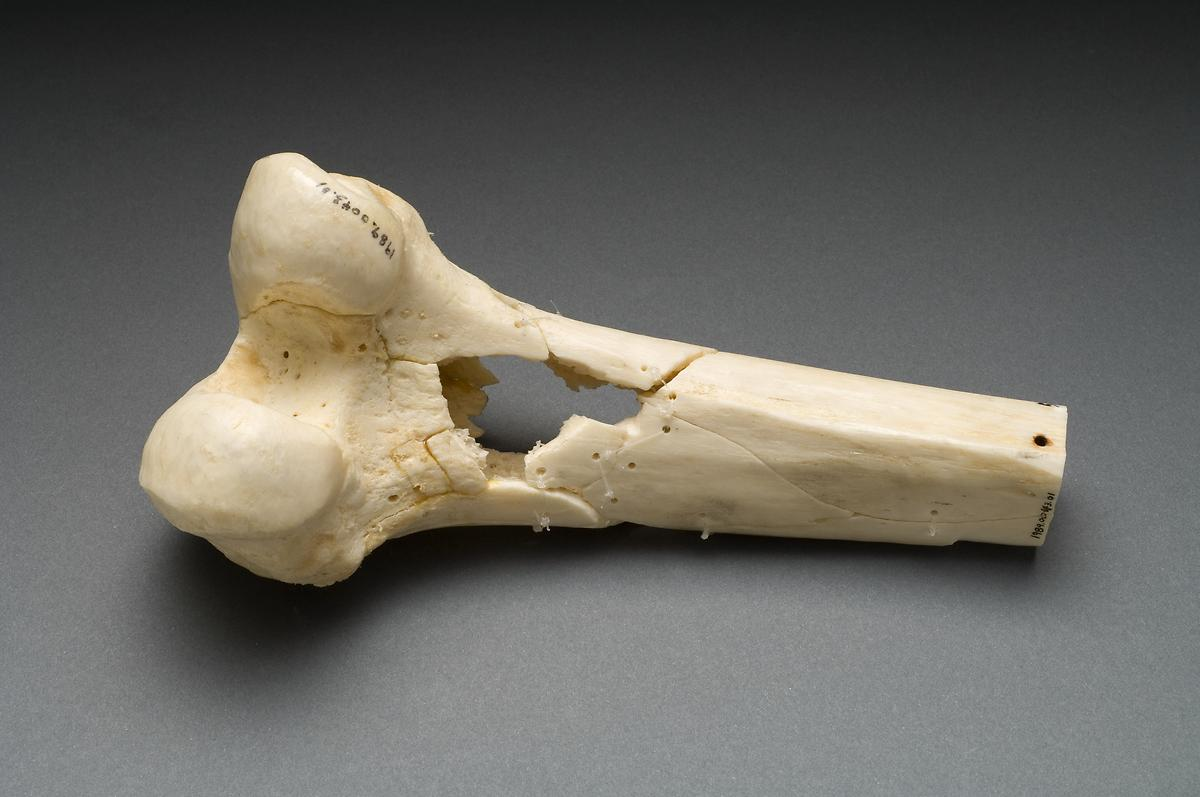
Femur shot with a .58 caliber Minié ball

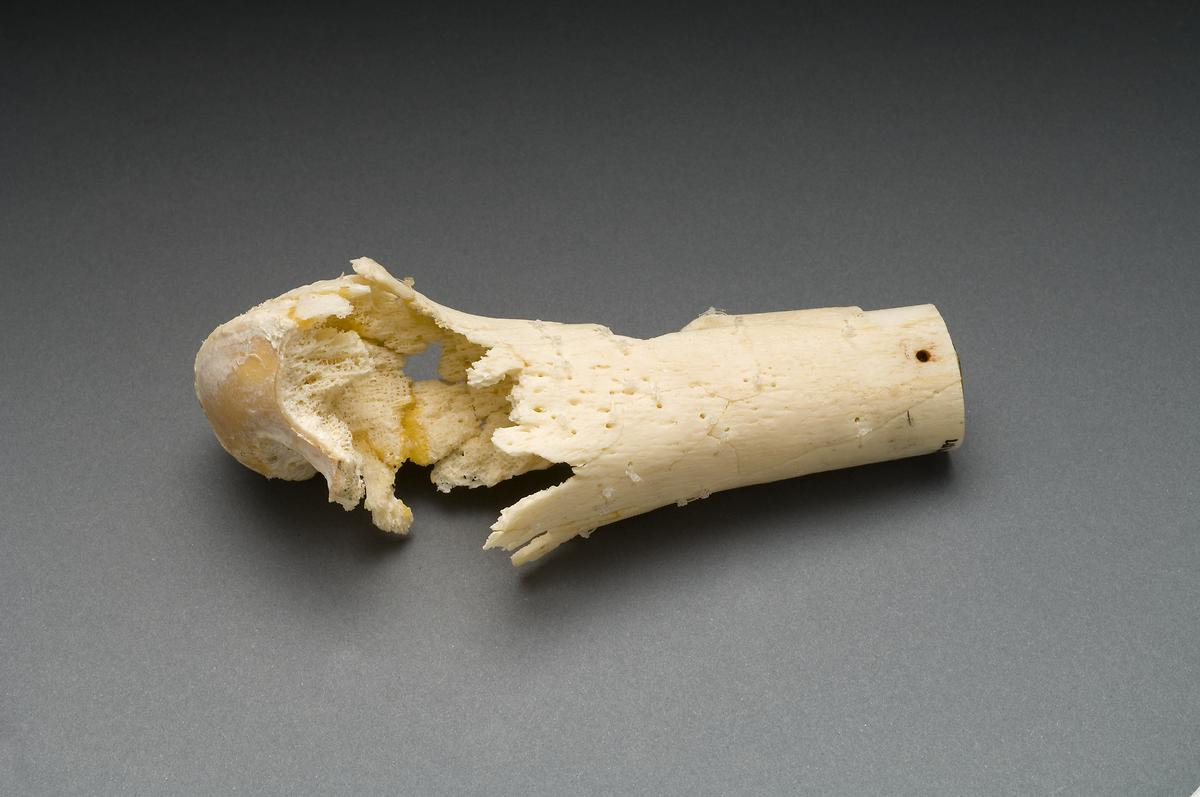
Femur shot with a 5.56 mm bullet

The degree of tissue disruption caused by a projectile is related to the cavitation the projectile creates as it passes through tissue. A bullet with sufficient energy will have a cavitation effect in addition to the penetrating track injury. As the bullet passes through the tissue, initially crushing then lacerating, the space left forms a cavity; this is called the permanent cavity. Higher-velocity bullets create a pressure wave that forces the tissues away, creating not only a permanent cavity the size of the caliber of the bullet but a temporary cavity or secondary cavity, which is often many times larger than the bullet itself. The temporary cavity is the radial stretching of tissue around the bullet's wound track, which momentarily leaves an empty space caused by high pressures surrounding the projectile that accelerate material away from its path. The extent of cavitation, in turn, is related to the following characteristics of the projectile:

- Kinetic energy: KE = 1/2mv^{2} (where m is mass and v is velocity). This helps to explain why wounds produced by projectiles of higher mass and/or higher velocity produce greater tissue disruption than projectiles of lower mass and velocity. The velocity of the bullet is a more important determinant of tissue injury. Although both mass and velocity contribute to the overall energy of the projectile, the energy is proportional to the mass while proportional to the square of its velocity. As a result, for constant velocity, if the mass is doubled, the energy is doubled; however, if the velocity of the bullet is doubled, the energy increases four times. The initial velocity of a bullet is largely dependent on the firearm. The US military commonly uses 5.56-mm bullets, which have a relatively low mass as compared with other bullets; however, the speed of these bullets is relatively fast. As a result, they produce a larger amount of kinetic energy, which is transmitted to the tissues of the target. The size of the temporary cavity is approximately proportional to the kinetic energy of the bullet and depends on the resistance of the tissue to stress. Muzzle energy, which is based on muzzle velocity, is often used for ease of comparison.
- Yaw: Handgun bullets will generally travel in a relatively straight line or make one turn if a bone is hit. Upon travel through deeper tissue, high-energy rounds may become unstable as they decelerate, and may tumble (pitch and yaw) as the energy of the projectile is absorbed, causing stretching and tearing of the surrounding tissue.
- Fragmentation: Most commonly, bullets do not fragment, and secondary damage from fragments of shattered bone is a more common complication than bullet fragments.

== Diagnosis ==
=== Classification ===
Gunshot wounds are classified according to the speed of the projectile using the Gustilo open fracture classification:

- Low-velocity: Less than 335 m/s (1,100 ft/s)

Low velocity wounds are typical of small caliber handguns. They do not usually cause extensive soft tissue damage, and in the Gustilo open fracture classification are classified as Type 1 or 2 wounds.

- Medium-velocity: Between 360 m/s (1,200 ft/s) and 600 m/s (2,000 ft/s)

These are more typical of shotgun blasts or higher caliber handguns like magnums. The risk of infection from these types of wounds can vary depending on the type and pattern of bullets fired as well as the distance from the firearm.

- High-velocity: Between 600 m/s (2,000 ft/s) and 1,000 m/s (3,500 ft/s)

Usually caused by powerful assault or hunting rifles and usually cause Gustilo Type 3 wounds. The risk of infection is especially high due to the large area of injury and destroyed tissue.

Bullets from handguns are sometimes less than 300 m/s (980 ft/s) but with modern pistol loads, they usually are slightly above 300 m/s (980 ft/s), while bullets from most modern rifles exceed 750 m/s (2,500 ft/s). One recently developed class of firearm projectiles is the hyper-velocity bullet, such cartridges are usually made for achieving such high speed, purpose-built in factories or made by amateurs. Examples of hyper velocity cartridges include the .220 Swift, .17 Remington and .17 Mach IV cartridges. The US military commonly uses 5.56mm bullets, which have a relatively low mass as compared with other bullets (2,6-4,0 grams); however, the speed of these bullets is relatively fast (approximately 850 m/s (2,800 ft/s), placing them in the high velocity category). As a result, they produce a larger amount of kinetic energy, which is transmitted to the tissues of the target. High energy transfer results in more tissue disruption, which plays a role in incapacitation, but other factors such as wound size and shot placement are also important.

=== Kronlein shot ===
The "Kronlein shot" (German: Krönleinschuss) is a distinctive type of headshot wound that can only be created by a high velocity rifle bullet or shotgun slug. In a Kronlein shot, the intact brain is ejected from the skull and deposited some distance from the victim's body. This type of wound is believed to be caused by a hydrodynamic effect. Hydraulic pressure generated within the skull by a high velocity bullet leads to the explosive ejection of the brain from the fractured skull.

== Prevention ==
Interventions have been recommended to reduce the risk of firearm related injury or death. Various medical organizations in the United States have recommended criminal background checks be required before a person can purchase a gun, and that those convicted for violent crimes be precluded from purchase. They also support safe-storage laws, as well as better mental health care and removal of guns from those at risk of suicide. Physicians are encouraged to counsel patients regarding safe storage and other injury prevention strategies during routine medical care. Keeping guns locked and unloaded is associated with a lower risk of gun related injury or death (including a lower risk of suicide) for all household members.

Temporarily removing guns from the home, either voluntarily or by court order (such as with extreme risk protection orders [so called "red flag laws"] in the United States) is recommended for those who are at risk of suicide or violence towards others. Such laws have been associated with a lower risk of suicide using guns in population based studies.

== Management ==
Initial assessment for a gunshot wound is approached in the same way as other acute trauma using the advanced trauma life support (ATLS) protocol. These include:

- A) Airway - Assess and protect airway and potentially the cervical spine
- B) Breathing - Maintain adequate ventilation and oxygenation
- C) Circulation - Assess for and control bleeding to maintain organ perfusion including focused assessment with sonography for trauma (FAST)
- D) Disability - Perform basic neurological exam including Glasgow Coma Scale (GCS)
- E) Exposure - Expose entire body and search for any missed injuries, entry points, and exit points while maintaining body temperature

Depending on the extent of injury, management can range from urgent surgical intervention to observation. As such, any history from the scene such as gun type, shots fired, shot direction and distance, blood loss on scene, and pre-hospital vitals signs can be very helpful in directing management. Unstable people with signs of bleeding that cannot be controlled during the initial evaluation require immediate surgical exploration in the operating room. Otherwise, management protocols are generally dictated by anatomic entry point and anticipated trajectory.

=== Neck ===
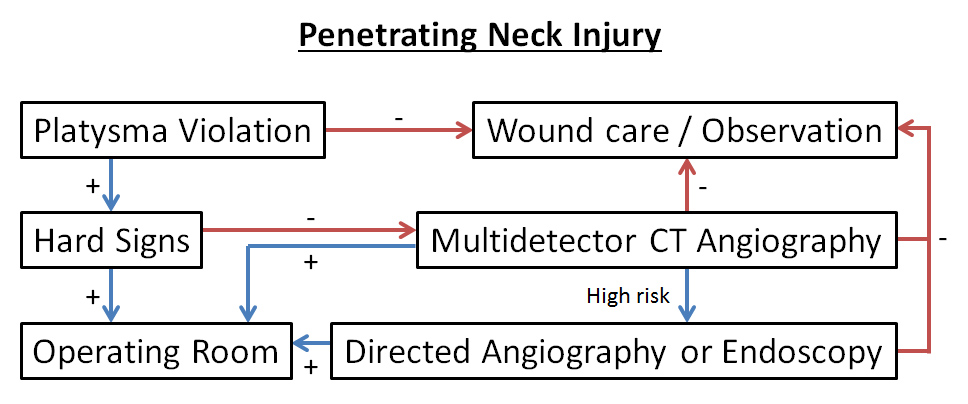
Penetrating neck injury protocol

A gunshot wound to the neck can be particularly dangerous because of the high number of vital anatomical structures contained within a small space. The neck contains the larynx, trachea, pharynx, esophagus, vasculature (carotid, subclavian, and vertebral arteries; jugular, brachiocephalic, and vertebral veins; thyroid vessels), and nervous system anatomy (spinal cord, cranial nerves, peripheral nerves, sympathetic chain, brachial plexus). Gunshots to the neck can thus cause severe bleeding, airway compromise, and nervous system injury.

Initial assessment of a gunshot wound to the neck involves non-probing inspection of whether the injury is a penetrating neck injury (PNI), classified by violation of the platysma muscle. If the platysma is intact, the wound is considered superficial and only requires local wound care. If the injury is a PNI, surgery should be consulted immediately while the case is being managed. Of note, wounds should not be explored on the field or in the emergency department given the risk of exacerbating the wound.

Due to the advances in diagnostic imaging, management of PNI has been shifting from a "zone-based" approach, which uses anatomical site of injury to guide decisions, to a "no-zone" approach which uses a symptom-based algorithm. The no-zone approach uses a hard signs and imaging system to guide next steps. Hard signs include airway compromise, unresponsive shock, diminished pulses, uncontrolled bleeding, expanding hematoma, bruits/thrill, air bubbling from wound or extensive subcutaneous air, stridor/hoarseness, neurological deficits. If any hard signs are present, immediate surgical exploration and repair is pursued alongside airway and bleeding control. If there are no hard signs, the person receives a multi-detector CT angiography for better diagnosis. A directed angiography or endoscopy may be warranted in a high-risk trajectory for the gunshot. A positive finding on CT leads to operative exploration. If negative, the person may be observed with local wound care.

=== Chest ===
Important anatomy in the chest includes the chest wall, ribs, spine, spinal cord, intercostal neurovascular bundles, lungs, bronchi, heart, aorta, major vessels, esophagus, thoracic duct, and diaphragm. Gunshots to the chest can thus cause severe bleeding (hemothorax), respiratory compromise (pneumothorax, hemothorax, pulmonary contusion, tracheobronchial injury), cardiac injury (pericardial tamponade), esophageal injury, and nervous system injury.

Initial workup as outlined in the Workup section is particularly important with gunshot wounds to the chest because of the high risk for direct injury to the lungs, heart, and major vessels. Important notes for the initial workup specific for chest injuries are as follows. In people with pericardial tamponade or tension pneumothorax, the chest should be evacuated or decompressed if possible prior to attempting tracheal intubation because the positive pressure ventilation can cause hypotention or cardiovascular collapse. Those with signs of a tension pneumothorax (asymmetric breathing, unstable blood flow, respiratory distress) should immediately receive a chest tube (> French 36) or needle decompression if chest tube placement is delayed. FAST exam should include extended views into the chest to evaluate for hemopericardium, pneumothorax, hemothorax, and peritoneal fluid.

Those with cardiac tamponade, uncontrolled bleeding, or a persistent air leak from a chest tube all require surgery. Cardiac tamponade can be identified on FAST exam. Blood loss warranting surgery is 1–1.5 L of immediate chest tube drainage or ongoing bleeding of 200-300 mL/hr. Persistent air leak is suggestive of tracheobronchial injury which will not heal without surgical intervention. Depending on the severity of the person's condition and if cardiac arrest is recent or imminent, the person may require surgical intervention in the emergency department, otherwise known as an emergency department thoracotomy (EDT).

However, not all gunshot to the chest require surgery. Asymptomatic people with a normal chest X-ray can be observed with a repeat exam and imaging after 6 hours to ensure no delayed development of pneumothorax or hemothorax. If a person only has a pneumothorax or hemothorax, a chest tube is usually sufficient for management unless there is large volume bleeding or persistent air leak as noted above. Additional imaging after initial chest X-ray and ultrasound can be useful in guiding next steps for stable people. Common imaging modalities include chest CT, formal echocardiography, angiography, esophagoscopy, esophagography, and bronchoscopy depending on the signs and symptoms.

=== Abdomen ===
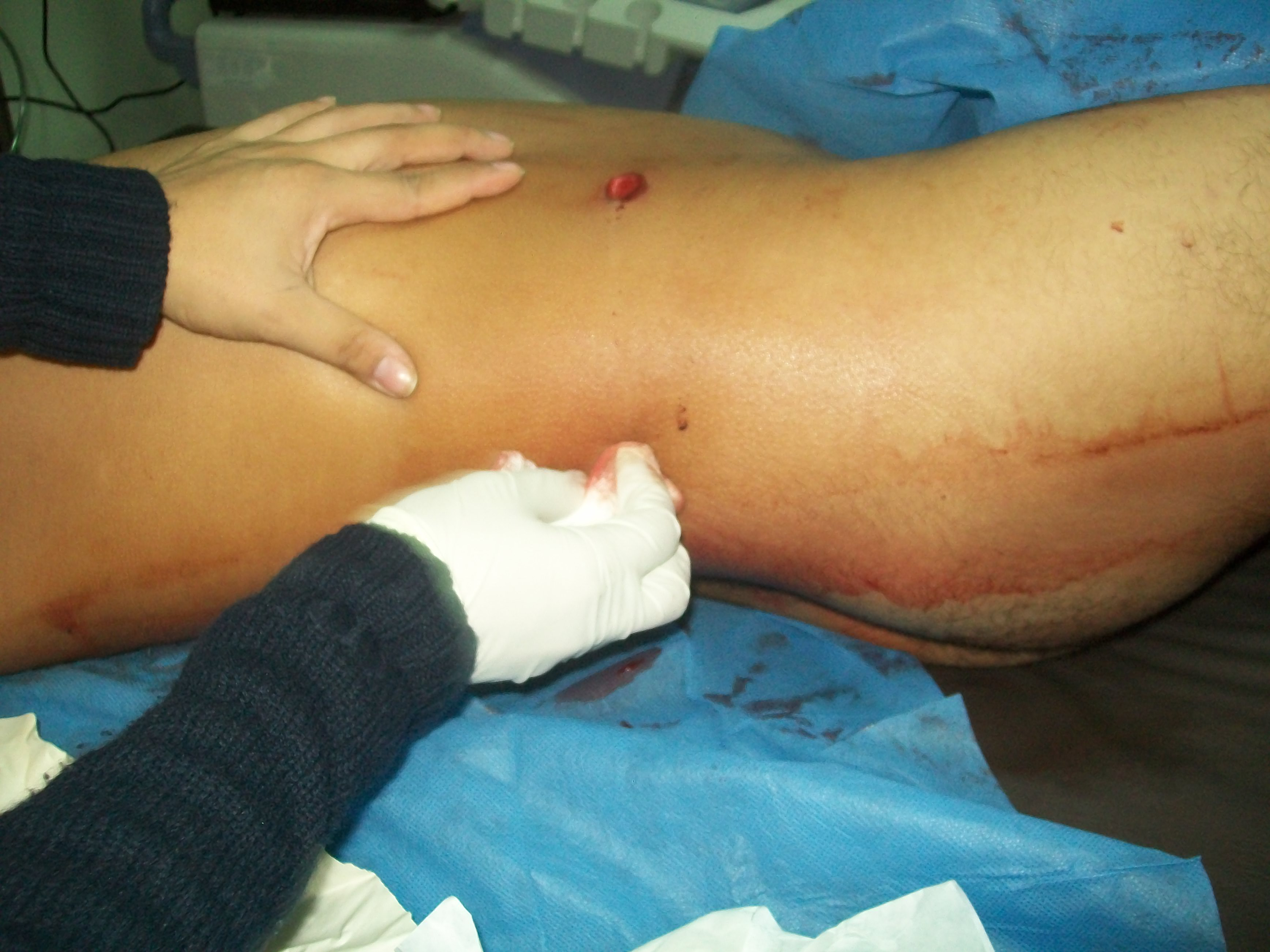
Abdominal gunshot wound

Important anatomy in the abdomen includes the stomach, small bowel, colon, liver, spleen, pancreas, kidneys, spine, diaphragm, descending aorta, and other abdominal vessels and nerves. Gunshots to the abdomen can thus cause severe bleeding, release of bowel contents, peritonitis, organ rupture, respiratory compromise, and neurological deficits.

The most important initial evaluation of a gunshot wound to the abdomen is whether there is uncontrolled bleeding, inflammation of the peritoneum, or spillage of bowel contents. If any of these are present, the person should be transferred immediately to the operating room for laparotomy. If it is difficult to evaluate for those indications because the person is unresponsive or incomprehensible, it is up to the surgeon's discretion whether to pursue laparotomy, exploratory laparoscopy, or alternative investigative tools.

Although all people with abdominal gunshot wounds were taken to the operating room in the past, practice has shifted in recent years with the advances in imaging to non-operative approaches in more stable people. If the person's vital signs are stable without indication for immediate surgery, imaging is done to determine the extent of injury. Ultrasound (FAST) and help identify intra-abdominal bleeding and X-rays can help determine bullet trajectory and fragmentation. However, the best and preferred mode of imaging is high-resolution multi-detector CT (MDCT) with IV, oral, and sometimes rectal contrast. Severity of injury found on imaging will determine whether the surgeon takes an operative or close observational approach.

Diagnostic peritoneal lavage (DPL) has become largely obsolete with the advances in MDCT, with use limited to centers without access to CT to guide requirement for urgent transfer for operation.

=== Extremities ===
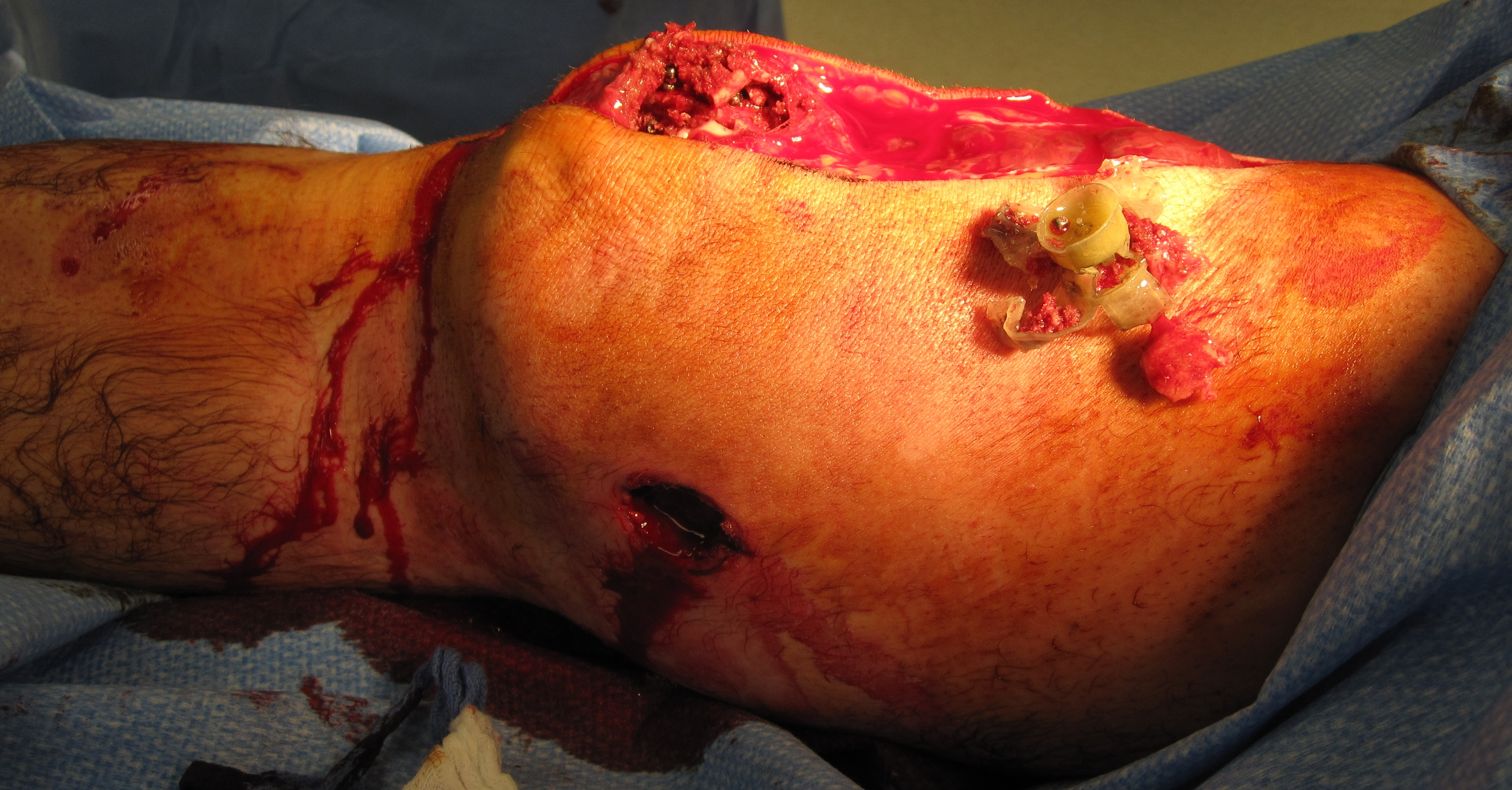
Acute penetrating trauma from a close-range shotgun blast injury to knee. Birdshot pellets are visible in the wound, within the shattered patella. The powder wad from the shotgun shell has been extracted from the wound, and is visible at the upper right of the image.

The four main components of extremities are bones, vessels, nerves, and soft tissues. Gunshot wounds can thus cause severe bleeding, fractures, nerve deficits, and soft tissue damage. The Mangled Extremity Severity Score (MESS) is used to classify the severity of injury and evaluates for severity of skeletal and/or soft tissue injury, limb ischemia, shock, and age. Depending on the extent of injury, management can range from superficial wound care to limb amputation.

Vital sign stability and vascular assessment are the most important determinants of management in extremity injuries. As with other traumatic cases, those with uncontrolled bleeding require immediate surgical intervention. If surgical intervention is not readily available and direct pressure is insufficient to control bleeding, tourniquets or direct clamping of visible vessels may be used temporarily to slow active bleeding. People with hard signs of vascular injury also require immediate surgical intervention. Hard signs include active bleeding, expanding or pulsatile hematoma, bruit/thrill, absent distal pulses and signs of extremity ischemia.

For stable people without hard signs of vascular injury, an injured extremity index (IEI) should be calculated by comparing the blood pressure in the injured limb compared to an uninjured limb in order to further evaluate for potential vascular injury. If the IEI or clinical signs are suggestive of vascular injury, the person may undergo surgery or receive further imaging including CT angiography or conventional arteriography.

In addition to vascular management, people must be evaluated for bone, soft tissue, and nerve injury. Plain films can be used for fractures alongside CTs for soft tissue assessment. Fractures must be debrided and stabilized, nerves repaired when possible, and soft tissue debrided and covered. This process can often require multiple procedures over time depending on the severity of injury.

== Epidemiology ==
In 2015, about a million gunshot wounds occurred from interpersonal violence. Firearms, globally in 2016, resulted in 251,000 deaths up from 209,000 in 1990. Of these deaths 161,000 (64%) were the result of assault, 67,500 (27%) were the result of suicide, and 23,000 were accidents. Firearm related deaths are most common in males between the ages of 20 and 24 years.

In 2016, the countries with the largest number of deaths from firearms are Brazil, United States, Mexico, Colombia, Venezuela, Guatemala, Bahamas and South Africa which make up just over half the total. In the United States in 2015, about half of the 44,000 people who died by suicide did so with a gun.

As of 2016, the countries with the highest rates of gun violence per capita were El Salvador, Venezuela, and Guatemala with 40.3, 34.8, and 26.8 violent gun deaths per 100,000 people respectively. The countries with the lowest rates of were Singapore, Japan, and South Korea with 0.03, 0.04, and 0.05 violent gun deaths per 100,000 people respectively.

=== Canada ===
In 2016, about 893 people died due to gunshot wounds in Canada (2.1 per 100,000). About 80% were suicides, 12% were assaults, and 4% were accidents.

=== United States ===
In 2017, there were 39,773 deaths in the United States as a result of gunshot wounds. Of these 60% were suicides, 37% were homicides, 1.4% were by law enforcement, 1.2% were accidents, and 0.9% were from an unknown cause. This is up from 37,200 deaths in 2016 due to a gunshot wound (10.6 per 100,000). With respect to those that pertain to interpersonal violence, it had the 31st highest rate in the world with 3.85 deaths per 100,000 people in 2016. The majority of all homicides and suicides are firearm-related, and the majority of firearm-related deaths are the result of murder and suicide. When sorted by GDP, however, the United States has a much higher violent gun death rate compared to other developed countries, with over 10 times the number of firearms assault deaths than the next four highest GDP countries combined. Gunshot violence is the third most costly cause of injury and the fourth most expensive form of hospitalization in the United States.

== History ==
Until the 1880s, the standard practice for treating a gunshot wound called for physicians to insert their unsterilized fingers into the wound to probe and locate the path of the bullet. Standard surgical theory such as opening abdominal cavities to repair gunshot wounds, germ theory, and Joseph Lister's technique for antiseptic surgery using diluted carbolic acid, had not yet been accepted as standard practice. For example, sixteen doctors attended to President James A. Garfield after he was shot in 1881, and most probed the wound with their fingers or dirty instruments. Historians agree that massive infection was a significant factor in Garfield's death.

At almost the same time, in Tombstone, Arizona Territory, on 13 July 1881, George E. Goodfellow performed the first laparotomy to treat an abdominal gunshot wound. Goodfellow pioneered the use of sterile techniques in treating gunshot wounds, washing the person's wound and his hands with lye soap or whisky, and his patient, unlike the President, recovered. He became America's leading authority on gunshot wounds and is credited as the United States' first civilian trauma surgeon.

Mid-nineteenth-century handguns such as the Colt revolvers used during the American Civil War had muzzle velocities of just 230 m/s and their powder and ball predecessors had velocities of 167 m/s or less. Unlike today's high-velocity bullets, nineteenth-century balls produced almost little or no cavitation and, being slower moving, they were liable to lodge in unusual locations at odds with their trajectory.

Wilhelm Röntgen's discovery of X-rays in 1895 led to the use of radiographs to locate bullets in wounded soldiers.

Survival rates for gunshot wounds improved among US military personnel during the Korean and Vietnam Wars, due in part to helicopter evacuation, along with improvements in resuscitation and battlefield medicine. Similar improvements were seen in US trauma practices during the Iraq War. Military health care providers who return to civilian practice sometimes disseminate military trauma care practices. One such practice is to transfer major trauma cases to an operating theater as soon as possible, to stop internal bleeding. Within the United States, the survival rate for gunshot wounds has increased, leading to declines in the gun death rate in states that have stable rates of gunshot hospitalizations.

== See also ==
- Blast injury, an injury that may present similar dangers to a gunshot wound.
- Bullet hit squib, a special effect used in the film industry to portray a gunshot wound.
- Stab wound, an equivalent penetrating injury caused by a bladed weapon or any other sharp objects.
