= 2025 Maine Question 1 =

- November 4, 2025
- Require Voter Photo ID and Change Absentee Ballot and Dropbox Rules Initiative Do you want to change Maine election laws to eliminate two days of absentee voting, prohibit requests for absentee ballots by phone or family members, end ongoing absentee voter status for seniors and people with disabilities, ban prepaid postage on absentee ballot return envelopes, limit the number of drop boxes, require voters to show certain photo ID before voting, and make other changes to our elections?

Results
Choice	Votes	%
Yes	175,751	35.81%
No	315,008	64.19%
Total votes	490,759	100.00%

Yes
90–100%
80–90%
70–80%
60–70%
50–60%
No
90–100%
80–90%
70–80%
60–70%
50–60%
No Vote

Maine Question 1, officially the Require Voter Photo ID and Change Absentee Ballot and Dropbox Rules Initiative, was an indirect initiated state statute that appeared on the ballot in the U.S. state of Maine on November 4, 2025, concurrent with the 2025 United States elections. The measure was rejected by a wide margin.

== Background ==
A petition drive was launched by a conservative political action committee (PAC) to gather signatures for the initiative, as the Democratic-controlled Maine Legislature has for years refused to pass similar bills. The signatures were submitted in January 2025, where the initiative then went to the Legislature for consideration. As the legislature chose not to pass the initiative, it was placed on the 2025 election ballot.

The conservative PAC that organized the petition drive challenged the wording of the initiative, decided by Secretary of State Shenna Bellows, claiming that it was misleading due to the words "photo ID" only being mentioned in the final sentence. The Maine Supreme Judicial Court upheld the original wording in July.

== Text ==
Do you want to change Maine election laws to eliminate two days of absentee voting, prohibit requests for absentee ballots by phone or family members, end ongoing absentee voter status for seniors and people with disabilities, ban prepaid postage on absentee ballot return envelopes, limit the number of drop boxes, require voters to show certain photo ID before voting, and make other changes to our elections?

== Impact ==
If passed, the state of Maine would have required photo identification for all forms of voting. Photo ID cards would have been provided to registered voters who do not have a driver's license. Partisan officials would have been inserted into certain parts of elections that are now conducted by nonpartisan municipal clerks, among other changes described in the question. It would also make it more difficult for voters to request a mail-in ballot, eliminating the ability to request one by phone.

== Endorsements ==
Yes

Executive branch officials

- Bobby Charles, former assistant Secretary of State for International Narcotics and Law Enforcement Affairs (2003–2005) and candidate for governor in 2026 (Republican)

State legislators

- Laurel Libby, state representative from the 90th district (2022–present) and 68th district (2020–2022) (Republican)

Organizations

- Republican State Leadership Committee

Political parties

- Maine Republican Party
No

U.S. representatives

- Jared Golden, ME-2 (2019–present) (Democratic)
- Chellie Pingree, ME-1 (2009–present) (Democratic)

Statewide officials

- Shenna Bellows, Secretary of State of Maine (2021–present) (Democratic)
- Janet Mills, Governor of Maine (2019–present) and candidate for U.S. Senate in 2026 (Democratic)

State legislators

- Mattie Daughtry, President of the Maine Senate (2024–present) from the 23rd district (2022–present) and 24th district (2020–2022) (Democratic)
- Justin Alfond, former President of the Maine Senate (2012-2014); state senator from the 17th district (2008–2016) (Democratic)
- Ethan Strimling, former state senator from the 8th district (2003–2009) and former mayor of Portland (2015–2019) (Democratic)

Individuals

- Graham Platner, candidate for U.S. Senate in 2026 (Democratic)

Labor unions

- Maine AFL–CIO

Organizations

- American Civil Liberties Union of Maine
- League of Women Voters
- Democratic Congressional Campaign Committee
- Democratic Governors Association Maine
- Maine Women's Lobby
- Maine Conservation Voters
- Natural Resources Council of Maine
- VoteRiders

Tribes and tribal leaders

- Wabanaki Alliance

Political parties

- Maine Democratic Party

Newspapers

- Portland Press Herald
- Bangor Daily News
- Kennebec Journal

== Polling ==
Poll source	Date(s) administered	Sample size (Note: Key: A – all adults RV – registered voters LV – likely voters V – unclear)	Margin of error	Yes	No	Undecided
University of New Hampshire	October 16–21, 2025	1,015 (LV)	± 3.1%	48%	49%	3%

== Results ==
2025 Maine Question 1
Choice	Votes	%
For	175,751	35.81
Against	315,008	64.19
Total	490,759	100.00
Source: Associated Press

== Analysis ==
Supporters of the proposal conceded that had it been limited to simply requiring a photo ID to vote, it likely would have passed, with some like Republican state senator Brad Farrin stating that opponents successfully framed the question around absentee voting instead of the ID requirement, and that it "scared people". He added that the broad proposal gave opponents "a playbook to beat it". The editor-in-chief of The Maine Wire, a conservative news outlet, said the broad proposal was "a tactical blunder" that led to fewer donors giving resources, which also may have impacted the ultimately unsuccessful fight against Question 2 on the same ballot, which was passed, implementing a red flag gun law in Maine.

Some blamed the wording of the question (which had been unsuccessfully challenged in court) for its defeat, with state representative Laurel Libby claiming Secretary of State Shenna Bellows successfully "weaponized" the question. Libby also cited a nationwide "blue wave" with Democrats winning races in New Jersey and Virginia, as well as the passage of Democratic-backed California Proposition 50.
