= Safeguard American Voter Eligibility Act =

Proposed U.S. election law

- Long title: To amend the National Voter Registration Act of 1993 to require proof of United States citizenship to register an individual to vote in elections for Federal office, and for other purposes.
- Acronyms (colloquial): SAVE Act; SAVE America Act
- Number of co-sponsors: 110

Codification
- Acts amended: National Voter Registration Act of 1993

Legislative history
- Introduced in the 119th United States Congress as H.R. 22 by Chip Roy (R–TX) on January 3, 2025; Passed the House on April 10, 2025 (220–208)

The Safeguard American Voter Eligibility Act, also known as the SAVE Act or SAVE America Act, is a proposed United States federal law that requires documentary proof of U.S. citizenship in order to register to vote in U.S. federal elections. The bill was introduced amid unsubstantiated claims that there was significant election fraud in previous elections, including voting by undocumented immigrants, as part of the immigration policies of the second Donald Trump administration. Opponents have claimed that the bill would disenfranchise eligible voters.

== Background ==
In the 2020 United States presidential election, Republican president Donald Trump lost reelection to Democrat Joe Biden. Trump and the Republican Party began making numerous claims of voter fraud and filed multiple lawsuits challenging the elections; Trump's challenge also led to the events of the January 6 United States Capitol attack when Congress was to certify the election results. Nearly all these claims were disproven over the following years, even by experts hired by Trump to discover voter fraud.

Trump continued to assert there was fraud in the 2020 election after launching his bid for presidency in the 2024 election, in 2022. In contrast to the haphazard approach he and the Republicans took with the 2020 election results, the Republicans set out to discover any avenue they could use to impact voting and prevent perceived fraud. In addition to eliminating election fraud, another facet of Trump's 2024 campaign was combatting undocumented immigrants, leading to a new disproven claim pushed in the months before the election that nearly 2.7 million undocumented immigrants had voted in 2024; this figure originated from a 2014 study based on extrapolation of data from the Cooperative Election Study, and not based on any actual voter data. Despite this, Trump insisted that voting must be strictly controlled to prevent undocumented immigrants from voting in the 2024 and future elections.

On March 26, 2025, Trump signed Executive Order 14248,^{[ws]} which called for significant changes to vote registration, ballot casting, and vote counting. As of June 2026, a federal district judge has placed a permanent injunction blocking use of EO 14248, citing the lack of constitutionally-granted powers for the president to oversee elections, denying the claims of voting fraud.

== Provisions ==
The bill defines "documentary proof of United States citizenship". Valid documents for verifying citizenship, as stated by the bill, are one of the following:

1. A form of identification issued consistent with the requirements of the REAL ID law that indicates citizenship; (Note: As of 2026, enhanced driver's licenses are only available in five states: Michigan, Minnesota, New York, Vermont, and Washington.)
2. A valid U.S. passport; (Note: According to the Bipartisan Policy Center, "52% of registered voters do not have an unexpired passport with their current legal name.")
3. An official US military identification card together with a service record indicating a place of birth in the United States;
4. A valid government-issued photo ID card that lists a place of birth in the United States;
5. Any other valid government-issued photo ID card together with evidence of birth as a US citizen or naturalization, such as a US-issued birth certificate, a naturalization certificate, or a Consular Report of Birth Abroad (CRBA).

Non-enhanced driver's licenses or state ID cards, U.S. military ID cards, and tribal identification documents would not be sufficient alone since they do not indicate citizenship status and can be issued to non-citizen legal residents of the United States. Birth or naturalization certificates with names that do not match current identification could also not be used. The bill states that those who register to vote by mail "shall not be registered to vote in an election for Federal office unless ... documentary proof of United States citizenship" is presented in person. It would likely also curtail the use of automatic voter registration ("motor voter" laws), and online voter registration.

For those who cannot provide the documentary evidence required by the bill listed above, the bill would mandate each state to establish a process by which an applicant can sign an attestation that they are a US citizen, and a state or local official would then make a determination. Where there are discrepancies between documents presented, each state would have to provide a process wherein the applicant could submit additional documentation to establish their citizenship.

The bill does not authorize federal funding for the new state responsibilities it creates, and it includes no phase-in period. The bill requires the removal of suspected non-citizens from existing voter rolls, though it does not require prior notification of erroneous removals. The 2026 version of the bill also adds the requirement for states to share unredacted voting rolls with the Department of Homeland Security as another means to validate citizenship.

== Opposition ==
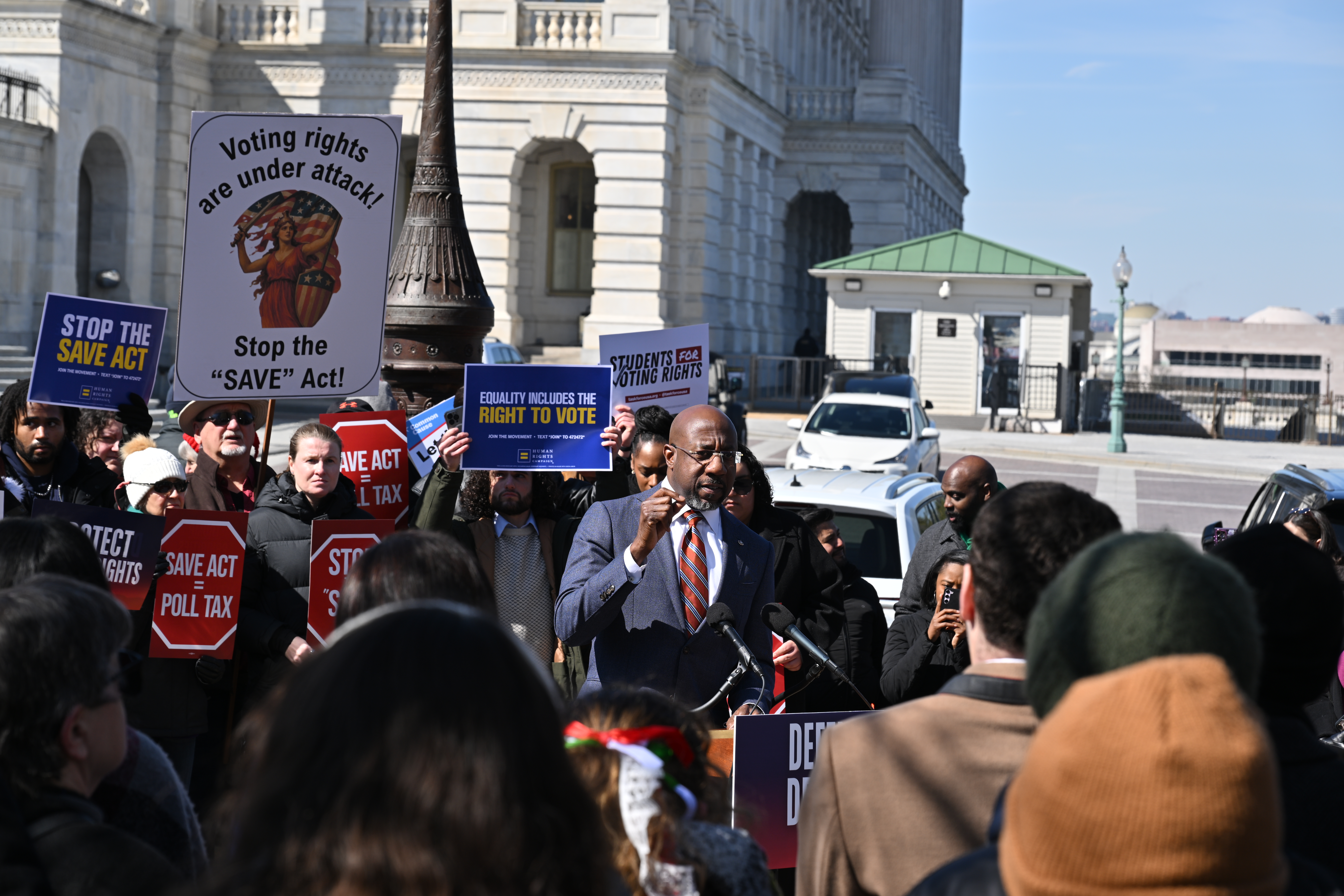
Senator Raphael Warnock (D-GA) at the "Stop the SAVE Act" rally outside the U.S. Capitol building

Non-citizens voting in federal elections has been proven to be extremely rare and is already illegal under Section 216 of the Illegal Immigration Reform and Immigrant Responsibility Act of 1996.

Opponents of the bill argue that it is intended to suppress voter turnout, as voter registration forms already require driver's license numbers or the last four digits of the applicant's Social Security number in compliance with the Help America Vote Act (HAVA), which registrars are required to use under HAVA to confirm eligibility through databases maintained by the U.S. Department of Homeland Security, the Social Security Administration, and the U.S. Postal Service. An analysis by the Center for American Progress found some voters in Alaska and Hawaii would need to fly to reach their election office in accordance with the in-person requirement to vote by mail. The analysis also found that an estimated 69 million women and 4 million men have a last name that does not match their birth certificate. This provision would similarly impact transgender people whose legal names do not match their birth certificates.

Research from the Brennan Center, "indicates that more than 9 percent of American citizens of voting age, or 21.3 million people, don't have proof of citizenship readily available". The center said the act "would compel voter roll purges that are bound to sweep in eligible American voters" and "when Arizona and Kansas implemented similar policies at the state level, tens of thousands of eligible citizens were blocked from registering," concluding, "the SAVE Act's proof-of-citizenship requirement is a solution in search of a problem." According to the U.S. Vote Foundation, the SAVE Act would jeopardize voting registration access for US military service members serving abroad and other US citizens resident overseas.

== Legislative history ==
The original version of the bill was one of the first introduced at the start of Trump's second term in January 2025, aligning with policy proposals put forth by Cleta Mitchell. The bill passed the U.S. House of Representatives in April 2025 on a 220-208 vote, but stalled in the Senate.

A new version of the bill, alternatively referred to as the SAVE America Act (Safeguard American Voter Eligibility America Act), was introduced to the House of Representatives in January 2026. The bill was introduced by Republican Senator Mike Lee of Utah, and cosponsored by late Republican South Carolina Senator Lindsey Graham. The bill passed the House by a vote of 218–213 on February 11, 2026. Only one Democrat, Henry Cuellar, voted with Republicans. The bill is expected to be challenged in the Senate, where it would require 60 votes to pass unless rules against the chamber's filibuster rules are changed.

Regarding the effect of the new version of the text if it were to pass, CNBC commented, "low-income and minority voters are more likely to lack the types of documents that would be required by a national voter ID law, leading to less voting participation by those groups." In the broader political context, Politico identified the bill as a "rare rallying point for a divided GOP".

At the onset of the 2026 Iran War in March 2026, President Trump insisted that the Senate drop the filibuster rule and pass the SAVE Act, as he claimed it was essential for Republicans to win the 2026 midterm elections. Trump vowed to not sign any bill into law until SAVE Act was passed, and also insisted that the bill must also contain amendments banning mail-in voting outside certain exemptions such as overseas military and for illnesses, and separate prohibitions on transgender rights, including federal bans on trans women in women's sports, and on gender-affirming care for minors—language that would require a new vote in the House and Senate. However in response, Senate majority leader John Thune said that it was unlikely for the bill to pass the Senate as there were not enough votes to override the filibuster or support a talking filibuster.

The Senate began deliberations on the bill on March 17, 2026, with Republicans desiring to extend the debate as long as possible and challenge the Democrats' criticism of the bill. Republicans in the Senate introduced amendments to the bill to address Trump's demands to ban trans women from women's sports and to criminalize the act of providing gender-affirming care to minors. An amendment to strictly relegate mail-in voting outside of limited cases was also introduced during this period.

As the Senate's debate on the bill continued past the week, Trump insisted that Republicans in the Senate not only override the filibuster but also to combine the SAVE Act bill with the appropriations bill to fund the Department of Homeland Security (DHS), which had not been funded since February 2026 and was in a partial shutdown. Democrats had refused to pass DHS's funding without additional measures in place to install oversight and prevent future controversial incidents, (Note: Examples of past controversial incidents include the list of immigration raids and arrests in the second Trump presidency and deportation in the second Trump administration) such as during the immigration enforcement action of Operation Metro Surge in Minneapolis, including the deaths of two citizens. While parts of the DHS, such as United States Customs and Border Protection and Immigration and Customs Enforcement were funded by the One Big Beautiful Bill Act in 2025, other agencies like the Transportation Security Administration (TSA), which handles airport security, were not. TSA had been working without pay since late February, causing many to call in sick or quit, and leading to extended delays for travelers at larger airports by March 22, 2026.

Trump signed an EO to temporarily fund the DHS on March 27, 2026. The Senate returned to deliberations on the SAVE Act, through early April until the Easter break. On return, the Senate refocused on the longer-term appropriations bill for DHS, with the Republicans opting to use the reconciliation approach to allow it to pass with a simple majority, though requiring oversight of all amendments. Senator John Kennedy submitted the SAVE Act as an amendment to this process, but the amendment was rejected in a 48-50 vote, with Republican senators Lisa Murkowski, Mitch McConnell, Susan Collins, and Thom Tillis joining the Democrats. Thune said he would not likely bring the SAVE Act to the floor debate during the remainder of the session, given the unlikely chance the bill would pass. The Senate officially failed the SAVE Act as an amendment to the DHS funding bill upon its passage in the Senate in June 2026, with four Republicans joining Democrats to block its inclusion.

Later that June, both houses passed the 21st Century Road to Housing Act, a bill to support the lowering of housing costs, with large bipartisan support. While Trump had said he would initially sign the bill on June 24, he refused to sign it until the SAVE America Act was passed, calling the need for it a national emergency. House speaker Mike Johnson proposed attaching the bill to the National Defense Authorization Act for Fiscal Year 2027 (NDAA) using a mechanism called MIRVing, based on the military concept of multiple independently targetable reentry vehicles, as to force the Senate to pass the SAVE America Act with the NDAA. The measure was defeated on June 30, 2026, due to a number of Republicans objecting to the measure, including Representative Anna Paulina Luna, who said that MIRVing could easily be undone by the Senate, and the Act had to be included as a proper amendment to the NDAA to pass that chamber. By July 14, Johnson was able to sway Luna and the other Republican holdouts by attaching it to the NDAA and other must-pass bills, putting pressure on Thune to retain the act when the appropriations bills reached the Senate. The House approved attaching the SAVE America Act to the NDAA on a 217-209 vote on July 15, 2026, though Senator Chuck Schumer, the leading Democrat in the Senate, asserted that that bill would not pass the Senate with the SAVE America Act included. The NDAA, with this bill, fully passed the House on July 22 on a 216-212 vote. As of November 2026, the Senate had yet to pass the NDAA.

Additionally, in July 2026, the House passed the Stop Insider Trading Act by a vote of 232-198, aimed to ban stock trading by members of Congress. Republicans had included the requirement that voters must show photo identification when they vote within this bill. The bill failed to be advanced in the Senate in September 2026 on a 53-47 vote.

== See also ==
- Republican Party efforts to disrupt voting after the 2024 United States presidential election
- Voter identification laws in the United States
- 2026 United States federal budget
- Voter suppression in the United States
- Democratic backsliding in the United States
- Nineteenth Amendment to the United States Constitution
