= 2025 Maine Question 2 =

- November 4, 2025
- Extreme Risk Protection Orders to Restrict Firearms and Weapons Access Initiative Do you want to allow courts to temporarily prohibit a person from having dangerous weapons if law enforcement, family, or household members show that the person poses a significant danger of causing physical injury to themselves or others?

Results
Choice	Votes	%
Yes	307,911	62.90%
No	181,601	37.10%
Valid votes	489,512	99.49%
Invalid or blank votes	2,496	0.51%
Total votes	492,008	100.00%

Yes
70–80%
60–70%
50–60%
No
50–60%

Maine Question 2, officially the Extreme Risk Protection Orders to Restrict Firearms and Weapons Access Initiative, was an indirect initiated state statute that appeared on the ballot in the U.S. state of Maine on November 4, 2025, concurrent with the 2025 United States elections. The measure passed.

== Background ==
The Maine Gun Safety Coalition announced in January 2025 that they had gathered over 80,000 signatures from Maine citizens in support of the initiative. The signatures were validated in March 2025, and the initiative was certified as having qualified for the ballot in the November 2025 election.

In June, gun owners' rights groups threatened to file a lawsuit against the Maine Legislature if it did not schedule a public hearing on the citizens' proposed ERPO Act, as required by state law. Opposition within the Legislature to holding the hearing was dropped soon after. As the Legislature did not vote to enact the citizens' initiated Act, it will now go to the voters on the November 2025 ballot as Question 2.

Unlike Maine's yellow flag law, Question 2 does not require the homicidal or suicidal individual to be taken into custody first and subjected to mental health evaluation before obtaining the temporary gun removal order. Thus, if Question 2 passes, law enforcement will have the ability to obtain a court order to remove the individual's guns when they are away from their home or car, without having to find and detain them.

Maine currently has yellow flag laws, a lesser version of red flag laws. In Maine, only law enforcement officers can confiscate firearms, while a judge requires a mental health evaluation to do the same.

== Text ==
Do you want to allow courts to temporarily prohibit a person from having dangerous weapons if law enforcement, family, or household members show that the person poses a significant danger of causing physical injury to themselves or others?

== Impact ==
The initiative would allow judges to more easily issue extreme risk protection orders, permitting them to authorize confiscation of firearms if an individual is deemed a threat by a judge based on evidence presented by law enforcement or family members. It would also prohibit the individual from purchasing a firearm for one year, unless the respondent files a successful motion to terminate the extreme risk protection order early.

The confiscation/prohibition process begins with a family member or a law enforcement officer filing an affidavit attesting to the alleged threat the individual poses. A judge may hold a hearing, at which the individual may argue in their defense, within fourteen days of the affidavit's filing, or a judge may choose to use an "emergency clause" to forcibly confiscate the individual's firearms immediately, before any due process, with a hearing scheduled within fourteen days. A confiscation may last for up to a year.

== Endorsements ==
Yes

State legislators

- Troy Jackson, former president of the Maine Senate (2018–2024) from the 1st district (2016–2024) (Note: Previously, the 25th district from 2018 to 2014.) (Democratic)

Individuals

- Graham Platner, Sullivan Harbor Master, candidate for U.S. Senate in 2026 (Democratic)

Organizations

- Maine Association of Psychiatric Physicians
- Maine Medical Association
- Episcopal Diocese of Maine
- Global Impact Social Welfare Fund

Media

- Portland Press Herald
- Bangor Daily News
No

Statewide officials

- Janet Mills, Governor of Maine (2019–present) (Democratic)

State legislators

- Jennifer Poirier, state representative from the 70th district (2020–present) (Republican)
- David Trahan, former state senator from the 20th district (2008–2012) (Republican)

Organizations

- Maine State Police
- Sportsmen's Alliance of Maine

Political parties

- Maine Republican Party

== Polling ==
Poll source	Date(s) administered	Sample size (Note: Key: A – all adults RV – registered voters LV – likely voters V – unclear)	Margin of error	Yes	No	Undecided
University of New Hampshire	October 16–21, 2025	1,015 (LV)	± 3.1%	38%	40%	22%

== Results ==
2025 Maine Question 2
Choice	Votes	%
For	307,911	62.90
Against	181,601	37.10
Total	489,512	100.00
Valid votes	489,512	100.00
Invalid/blank votes	0	0.00
Total votes	489,512	100.00
Source: Associated Press

=== By county ===
County	Yes		No		Invalid	Total	Turnout
County	#	%	#	%	Invalid	Total	Turnout
Androscoggin	19,060	57.56%	14,051	42.44%	183	33,294	
Aroostook	8,267	46.98%	9,391	53.02%	84	17,742	
Cumberland	94,471	77.27%	27,784	22.73%	600	122,855	
Franklin	5,307	51.57%	4,983	48.43%	42	10,332	
Hancock	14,587	63.01%	8,563	36.99%	96	23,246	
Kennebec	23,436	55.49%	18,798	44.51%	152	42,386	
Knox	11,394	66.86%	5,647	33.14%	63	17,104	
Lincoln	10,582	63.04%	6,203	36.96%	70	16,855	
Oxford	10,358	52.39%	9,412	47.61%	102	19,872	
Penobscot	24,693	52.54%	22,305	47.46%	177	47,175	
Piscataquis	2,399	41.26%	3,415	58.74%	22	5,836	
Sagadahoc	10,681	64.08%	5,987	35.92%	75	16,743	
Somerset	6,287	42.74%	8,357	57.26%	330	14,974	
Waldo	9,315	58.67%	6,563	41.33%	61	15,939	
Washington	5,064	44.68%	6,269	55.32%	104	11,437	
York	49,929	64.32%	23,702	35.68%	325	73,956	
Totals	307,911	62.26%	181,601	37.74%	2,496	492,008	

== See also ==
- Red flag law
