= Extreme Risk Protection Order Act =

The Extreme Risk Protection Order Act is federal gun control legislation to support State, Tribal, and local efforts under "red flag laws" to remove access to firearms from individuals who are considered a danger to themselves or others. Sen. Richard Blumenthal introduced such legislation in March 2018, in the 115th U.S. Congress; and Dianne Feinstein introduced such legislation in February 2019, in the 116th U.S. Congress. The House version of her legislation was introduced by Rep. Salud Carbajal and re-introduced on 14 February 2019, one year after the Stoneman Douglas High School shooting.

Sen. Marco Rubio also introduced a similar bill, the Extreme Risk Protection Order and Violence Prevention Act, and Rep. Lucy McBath introduced a Federal Extreme Risk Protection Order Act which is identical to a bill introduced in the Senate by Blumenthal and Graham. The provisions of McBath's bill, creating a process for petitioning to U.S. District Courts, were incorporated as amendments to the bill that was reported out of the House committee.

== Provisions ==
The Feinstein legislation states, "If the court finds by a preponderance of the evidence that the respondent poses a danger of causing harm to himself, herself, or others by having access to a firearm, the court may issue an extreme risk protection order." Also, an ex parte extreme risk protection order can be issued if "the court finds there is reasonable cause to believe that the respondent poses a danger of causing harm to himself, herself, or others in the near future by having access to a firearm."

The legislation also amends 18 U.S. Code § 922(g) to make violation of such orders a federal felony. In order for a state to get grants under the Act, it has to enact a red flag law meeting certain requirements, such as allowing family members, rather than only police, to petition the courts. Rhode Island, for example, would be unable to get grants under the Act without strengthening its red flag law.

A provision by Rep. Ken Buck (R) proposed "allow the issuance of a red flag order against anyone whose name appears in a gang database if there was probable cause to include that individual in the database". Rep. Eric Swalwell (D) requested to add "individuals affiliated with white nationalism" to the amendment as a Red Flag Indicator in exchange for her support. Rep. Ken Buck agreed, with the stipulation that "any type of supremacy" should be included, and revised the provision accordingly. The amendment failed 11–21 on September 14, 2019.

== Congressional action ==
Feinstein and Blumenthal argued that federal legislation is needed because "there is still no nationwide tool that would allow law enforcement and the courts to prevent tragedies like Isla Vista."

Shortly after the 2019 El Paso shooting and 2019 Dayton shooting, Senate Judiciary Committee Chairman Lindsey Graham announced his support for such legislation, stating that "grants will be given to law enforcement so they can hire and consult with mental health professionals to better determine which cases need to be acted upon." Feinstein and Rubio urged Graham to take up their bills. Blumenthal welcomed Republicans' openness to the plan as a "bipartisan breakthrough" and "major promising development."

Such legislation is also supported by Democratic presidential candidate Pete Buttigieg.

According to Senate Minority Leader Charles Schumer, Democrats will try to require any red flag measure that comes to the Senate floor be paired with a vote on legislation establishing universal background checks. He noted that Republican bills being proposed do not require states to adopt red flag legislation. Schumer said that Democrats would not accept a half-measure, arguing, "The notion that passing a tepid version of an Extreme Risk Protection Order (E.R.P.O.) bill — alone — is close to getting the job done in addressing rampant gun violence in the U.S. is wrong and would be an ineffective cop-out."

Senate Majority Leader Mitch McConnell said he expects background checks, assault weapons and red flag laws to be part of September's Senate debate about measures aimed at addressing gun violence. He remarked, "What we can't do is fail to pass something." Sen. John Barrasso, the third-ranking Senate Republican, said he had "a lot of concerns" about red flag laws.

On June 9, 2022, the House passed (Federal Extreme Risk Protection Order), a bill to nationalize red flag laws, which seek to keep guns away from individuals deemed a threat to themselves and others.
