= Global Impact =

US-based non-profit organization

- Established: 1956
- President and Chief Executive Officer: Scott Jackson
- Staff: Executive Vice President: Nathaniel Heller; Managing Director, Finance & Accounting: Christina Hadden; Vice President, Human Resources: Stephanie Scholz; Managing Director, Campaign Engagement: Brittany Mattfeld Craig; Vice President of Finance and Business Services and Controller: Sabrina Romero
- Budget: US$335.9 million (annually, FY2025)
- Address: 2300 N St. NW, Suite 501A, Washington, DC 20037
- Location: HQ: Washington, DC
- Website: charity.org

Global Impact is a non-profit organization offering advisory and infrastructure services that drive strategic philanthropy for nonprofit, public, and private sector clients. Global Impact has raised more than $3 billion for global charities since its inception in 1956. Global Impact employs over 150 staff and is part of Global Impact Ventures, alongside Geneva Global, Capital for Good, and the Global Impact Social Welfare Fund. Global Impact has operations around the world, including Global Impact UK, Global Impact Australia, and GI Canada.

The organization reports that it serves over 500 clients. In FY2025, Global Impact raised more than $330 million for global causes, generating over $10.5 million in employee giving pledges for Charity Alliance partners including CARE, Heifer International, Save the Children, the U.S. Fund for UNICEF, and World Vision.

Global Impact serves as a fiscal sponsor to over 200 clients with over $300 million in assets, including the VaxSocial Initiative. It also administers employee assistance funds and creates and implements fundraising strategies for nonprofit clients. Clients of these services include MOAS, Islamic Relief USA, and Action Against Hunger.

Global Impact led management, fundraising, and marketing for the Combined Federal Campaign, the federal government's workplace giving campaign. In FY2025, it raised more than $68 million in monetary and volunteer pledges for CFC charities.

== Programs ==
Global Impact divides its work into five areas of expertise: financial management and operations, which includes fiscal sponsorship; grantmaking and governance; fundraising and visibility; philanthropy advising and management; and program design and implementation, which includes employee assistance funds.

== Research ==
In 2025, Global Impact released two white papers based on a survey of 2,500 employed Americans conducted in partnership with Embold Research. Driving Employee Engagement: Key Insights for Corporate Giving Programs offers insights to help companies create more effective workplace giving programs, and Inspiring Greater Giving in the Workplace: Key Insights on Donor Trends for Nonprofits shares details on how nonprofits can forge effective partnerships with corporations and their workplace donors.
