= Red flag law =

American gun control law

In the United States, a red flag law (named after the idiom red flag meaning "warning sign"), also known as a risk-based gun removal law, is a gun law that permits a state court to order the temporary seizure of firearms (and other items regarded as dangerous weapons, in some states) from a person whom they believe may present a danger. A judge makes the determination to issue the order based on statements and actions made by the gun owner in question. Refusal to comply with the order is punishable as a criminal offense. After a set time, the guns are returned to the person from whom they were seized unless another court hearing extends the period of confiscation.

As of May 2023, 21 states and the District of Columbia have enacted some form of red-flag law. The specifics of the laws, and the degree to which they are utilized, vary from state to state. Names vary by state, and include Extreme Risk Protection Orders (ERPOs, in Colorado, Maryland, Massachusetts, Michigan, Minnesota, Nevada, New Jersey, New York, Oregon, Rhode Island, Vermont, Washington, and the District of Columbia); Extreme Risk Firearm Protection Orders (ERFPOs, in New Mexico); Emergency Substantial Risk Orders (ESROs, in Virginia); Firearm Restraining Orders (FROs, in Illinois); Gun Violence Protective Orders (GVPOs, in Hawaii); Gun Violence Restraining Orders (GVROs, in California); Lethal Violence Protective Orders (LVPOs, in Delaware), Risk Protection Orders (RPOs, in Florida); Risk Warrants (in Connecticut); and Proceedings for the Seizure and Retention of a Firearm (in Indiana).

== History and adoption ==
In 1999, Connecticut became the first state to enact a red flag law, after a rampage shooting at the Connecticut Lottery. It was followed by Indiana, which adopted its legislation in 2005; called Jake Laird's Law, it was named after an Indianapolis police officer was fatally shot by a mentally disturbed man. Subsequent red-flag laws were adopted by California (2014), Washington (2016), and Oregon (2017). The California State Legislature was the first to enact a red flag law allowing family members to petition state courts to remove weapons from persons deemed a threat after Elliot Rodger committed a mass shooting in Isla Vista, California; the California law also permits law enforcement officials to petition the court for an order for the removal of guns from an individual for up to twelve months.

Before 2018, only the above-mentioned five states had some version of red flag laws. After the Stoneman Douglas High School shooting in Parkland, Florida, in 2018, that number more than doubled, as more states enacted such laws: Florida, Vermont, Maryland, Rhode Island, New Jersey, Delaware, Massachusetts, Illinois, and the District of Columbia. A content analysis study published in 2022 examined newspaper articles published in 2018 in three states that passed ERPOs after the 2018 Stoneman Douglas High School shooting in Parkland, Florida (Florida, Rhode Island, and Vermont) and three states that did not (Pennsylvania, Colorado, and Ohio). The study found that the passage of ERPOs was associated with media coverage that used official policy names/acronyms (as opposed to simply "red flag"); accurately portrayed gun violence as a preventable problem, and that referred to ERPO policies in other states. The survey found that "although only one in four articles cited scientific evidence related to gun violence generally, articles about passing states were significantly more likely to cite the small but growing body of research about ERPO implementation and effectiveness. These findings point to the value of relevant data, likely in combination with the lived experience and advocacy efforts of those most impacted, for building policy momentum through the media."

In 2019, New York enacted a red-flag law as part of a broader package of gun-control legislation that overwhelmingly passed the state legislature. In addition to allowing police and family members to petition for entry of an extreme risk protection order, the law also allows teachers and school administrations to file such petitions, making New York the first state to include such a provision. Three other states enacted red-flag laws in 2019: Colorado, Nevada and Hawaii. The Colorado, Nevada, and Hawaii laws all went into effect on January 1, 2020.

In 2020, New Mexico became the 18th state to adopt a red-flag law, after Governor Michelle Lujan Grisham signed legislation on February 25, 2020. New Mexico's law went into effect on July 1, 2020.

In Virginia, the state's General Assembly, then controlled by Republicans, voted down red-flag legislation in its January 2019 session. After the Virginia Beach shooting later that year, Governor Ralph Northam, a Democrat, called the Republican-controlled General Assembly into special session to consider gun-control legislation. The legislature did not vote on any gun legislation. After the Democrats won control of both chambers of the General Assembly in the fall 2019 elections, for the first time in more than two decades, Northam vowed to reintroduce gun control proposals, including a red flag bill. The General Assembly subsequently passed an emergency substantial risk order (ESRO) law, on a party-line vote in the Senate and a nearly party-line vote in the House of Delegates. Northam signed the legislation into law in April 2020, alongside four separate gun measures. Fairfax County, Virginia and the Alexandria-based gun-violence prevention nonprofit group Safer Country have become leaders in awareness campaigns to inform the public and law enforcement about the use of Virginia's ESRO law.

Some local sheriffs in rural Colorado counties refused to use the state's risk-based gun violence prevention, with some declaring their counties "sanctuaries" from gun laws they opposed; many of the sheriffs reversed course after gun violence incidents in their communities. A 2022 analysis of court records by KHN found that, two and a half years after the passage of Colorado's risk-based gun violence prevention law, petitions for protection orders had been filed in 20 of the 37 counties with sheriffs who previously said that they would refuse to use or enforce such laws, and that such petitions were often filed "by the very sheriffs who had previously denounced the law." In El Paso County, Colorado, however, Sheriff Bill Elder followed a policy of barring the Sheriff's Office from filing petitions under Colorado's law based on Elder's belief that the laws are unconstitutional. (although Elder said that it would enforce orders granted by the courts on the petition of non-law enforcement). El Paso County was the location of a 2022 Colorado Springs shooting massacre in which a gunman killed five people and wounded many more. Despite a history of alarming behavior (such as bomb threats) that would have made him a candidate for a gun removal order under Colorado's law, the arrested man was never subject to a petition for an order and was thus legally permitted to obtain the guns used in the attack, raising new scrutiny of the sheriff's refusal to use the Colorado law.

In May 2023, Minnesota and Michigan became the 20th and 21st states to enact red flag laws. Minnesota's law went into effect on July 1, 2023. Michigan's law went into effect in February 2024.

On November 4, 2025, Maine voted to pass a Red Flag Law.

=== Proposed or pending state legislation ===
Other state legislatures considered similar legislation. In the recent past, red-flag bills were being considered but did not pass in the following states:

- Arizona: A red-flag bill previously died in the Arizona Legislature, but in 2019, Governor Doug Ducey renewed pressure on legislative Republicans to pass the law in the wake of the shootings in El Paso, Texas and Dayton, Ohio. In 2020, Gov. Ducey reversed his position and stated, “As long as I am governor, there will be no red flag law in the State of Arizona."
- North Carolina: Since 2018, red flag bills introduced by North Carolina Democratic legislators have been defeated or stalled in committee the Republican-controlled state House. North Carolina's governor, Democrat Josh Stein, supports the legislation. Democratic State Representative Marcia Morey has filed several such bills up to 2022 without hearings.
- Ohio: After the Dayton shooting, Ohio's Republican governor, Mike DeWine, announced that he wanted Ohio's Republican-controlled legislature to pass a red flag law. Two months later, however, DeWine retreated from this proposal. Republican State Senator Matt Dolan introduced Senate Bill 357 to the legislature in August 2022. The bill focuses on mental health and red-flag provisions.
- Tennessee: A red-flag bill had been introduced in the Tennessee Legislature, but in 2019 the Republican-controlled legislature declined to take up the bill, and Governor Bill Lee did not commit to support it. In 2020, Democratic State Senator Sara Kyle proposed Senate Bill 1807. Following the Covenant School shooting on March 27, 2023, after sustained public protest from parents, students, residents and legislators, Governor Lee asked the TN state legislature to work on a red flag law on April 11, 2023.
- New Hampshire: The Democratic-majority New Hampshire Legislature passed a red-flag bill, but it was vetoed by Republican Governor Chris Sununu.
- Nebraska: In 2019, Legislative Bill 58 was introduced which includes red-flag provisions.
- Kentucky: In 2022, House Resolution 74 was introduced which includes language opposing the adoption of a red-flag law, following previous attempts in 2019.
- Pennsylvania: Similar legislation was proposed, but did not pass.

=== Federal grant program ===
On June 25, 2022, President Joe Biden signed the Bipartisan Safer Communities Act that included several changes to U.S. gun laws, one of which authorizes governments of individual states to receive grants from the federal government if they enact and enforce red flag laws.

== Provisions ==
A 2018 American Psychiatric Association resource document on risk-based gun removal laws notes that all such laws are "designed to address crisis situations in which there is an acute concern about an individual's access to firearms" but the specific provisions of such laws differ from state-to-state, varying on matters such as "who can initiate the gun removal process, whether a warrant is required, what factors the court must consider before ordering firearm removal, what must be proven in court, how long the firearms are restricted, and what process is used to restore the individual's firearm access."

For example, in Indiana and New Mexico, only law enforcement may petition for an order. This aspect of the state law came under scrutiny following a mass shooting committed by a 19-year-old man who had previously been detained in a mental health hold and had a shotgun seized from him, only to go on to purchase the weapons used in the shooting following a failure by authorities to petition for an order. In contrast, in Oregon, any person living with the person of concern may file a petition. In New York, an order may be sought by a family member, a prosecutor or police official, a teacher, or a school administrator.

The California Legislature passed a measure in 2016 to allow high school and college employees, co-workers and mental health professionals to file such petitions, but this legislation was vetoed by Governor Jerry Brown. Similar legislation, however, was signed into law by Governor Gavin Newsom in 2019; the legislation, which went into effect January 1, 2020, expands the list of people who may request GVROs to include "an employer of the subject of the petition"; "a coworker of the subject of the petition, if they have had 'substantial and regular interactions with the subject for at least one year' and have obtained the approval of the employer"; and "an employee or teacher of a school that the subject has attended for the last six months, if the employee or teacher has obtained the approval of administrators."

In California, it is a misdemeanor offense for a person to file a GVRO petition "knowing the information in the petition to be false or with the intent to harass." Making false statements on petitions is also a criminal offense in other states; for example, in Colorado, a woman who lied on a petition was found guilty of "attempting to influence a public servant" and of perjury.

== Effects ==
A 2016 study published in the journal Law and Contemporary Problems analyzed data from the 762 gun removals under Connecticut's "risk warrant" law from October 1999 through June 2013 and determined that there was "one averted suicide for every ten to eleven gun seizure cases." The researchers concluded that "enacting and implementing laws like Connecticut’s civil risk warrant statute in other states could significantly mitigate the risk posed by that small proportion of legal gun owners who, at times, may pose a significant danger to themselves or others."

A 2018 study published in the journal Psychiatric Services utilized CDC data from all suicides in all 50 states from 1981–2015 to "examine the effects of Connecticut and Indiana's risk-based firearm seizure law on state-level firearm suicide rates." The researchers concluded that "Indiana’s firearm seizure law was associated with a 7.5% reduction in firearm suicides in the ten years following its enactment, an effect specific to suicides with firearms and larger than that seen in any comparison state by chance alone. Enactment of Connecticut's law was associated with a 1.6% reduction in firearm suicides immediately after its passage and a 13.7% reduction in firearm suicides in the post–Virginia Tech period, when enforcement of the law substantially increased." The study also found that "Whereas Indiana demonstrated an aggregate decrease in suicides, Connecticut's estimated reduction in firearm suicides was offset by increased non-firearm suicides."

A preliminary case series published in the Annals of Internal Medicine in 2019 analyzed the use of ERPOs in California, and found that the cases studied suggest that California's red-flag law, as a form of "urgent, individualized intervention ... can play a role in efforts to prevent mass shootings."

A 2023 review by the RAND Corporation concluded there was inconclusive evidence of the effect of red flag laws on firearm suicides.

In light of the fact that 62% of U.S. gun deaths from 2008 to 2017 were suicides, the potential for red flag laws to prevent suicide has been cited as a benefit that may be more valuable than their ability to prevent mass shootings.

== Usage ==
States with red-flag laws differ substantially in the rate that such laws were used. Nationwide in 2020, red-flag laws were used to remove guns about 5,000 times. The states that used red-flags most often in 2020 were Florida (2,355 uses), California (984), Maryland (476), New Jersey (311), and New York (255). A 2020 analysis found that, adjusted on a per-capita basis and on a per-day-in-effect basis, Florida used its red-flag law the most (9.4 orders per year per 100,000 residents), followed by Maryland (8.2 orders per year per 100,000 residents). One factor in different use rates is whether a state has courts that allow petitioners to seek an order after business hours and on weekends.

In some states, petitions for removal of guns are not filed, even where the facts would support issuance of an orders. For example, in Oregon, the state legislature enacted a red-flag law, but did not allocate funds for public education efforts. Local prosecutors led trainings and outreach for law enforcement, judges, and others.

=== California ===
In California in 2016 and 2017, 189 petitions for gun violence restraining orders were granted. Of these, 12 petitions were filed by family members, while the rest were filed by law enforcement.

=== Colorado ===
In 2020 (the first year that Colorado's red-flag law was in effect), Colorado courts issued 115 orders and denied 46 petitions. Most petitions were filed by law enforcement agencies. Colorado has two forms of court orders under the law: a temporary ERPO (TERPO), which has a duration of up to two weeks; and (if the TERPO is granted) a 364-day ERPO (which may be granted by the court after a hearing). In Colorado, petitions filed by law enforcement agencies are far likelier to be granted than petitions filed by family or household members: In the first year that Colorado's law was in effect, 82% of petitions for TERPOs and 85% of petitions for yearlong ERPOs filed by law enforcement were granted by courts; by contrast, 18% of petitions for TERPOs and 15% of petitions for yearlong ERPOs filed by family or household members were granted by courts. In 2023, the Governor of Colorado signed a bill into law that passed the Legislature - to reform and strengthen the red flag law of Colorado and other related firearms bills.

=== Connecticut ===
In Connecticut, a law prohibiting people under 21 from buying firearms has been enforced and the purchasing of assault rifles is disallowed. Connecticut also has some 764 "imminent risk" gun seizures were served between October 1999 and July 2013, according to a 2014 study in the Connecticut Law Review. Of gun seizure orders served, 91.5% were directed to men and 8.5% were directed to women, and the average age of the individuals was 47.4 years old. Police reports associated with the Connecticut gun seizures in 1999 to 2013 indicated that at the time of confiscation, about 30% of the subject gun owners "showed evidence of alcohol consumption" and about 10% "indicated using prescribed pain medications." At the time the warrants were served, the majority of gun owners (60% of men and 80% of women) were sent to a local hospital emergency department for an emergency evaluation; a minority (20%) were arrested. The study noted that "In over 70% of the cases, the outcome of the hearings was unknown. For the cases with outcomes reported, the judges ruled that the weapons needed to be held by the state 68% of the time. Weapons were returned in only twenty of the reported cases. In fifteen other cases, guns were given to a family member; in thirty cases, the guns were destroyed."

=== Florida ===
In Florida, red-flag orders were granted 21,091 times between March 2018 (when the law took effect) and January 2025. State judges granted petitions for temporary orders about 97% of the time and granted petitions for final orders 99% of the time. In many cases (up to 90% in Broward County) the respondent agrees to the order. The volume of petitions varies from county to county. Enforcement varies extremely haphazardly county to county.

=== Indiana ===
In Marion County, Indiana (which contains Indianapolis, and most of the uses of Indiana's ERPO law), a 2015 study published in the journal Behavioral Sciences & the Law found that seizure petitions were filed in court 404 times between 2006 and 2013, from persons identified as being a risk of suicide (68%), violence (21%), or psychosis (16%). The study found that 28% of firearm-seizure cases involved a domestic dispute and 26% involved intoxication. The study found that "The seized firearms were retained by the court at the initial hearing in 63% of cases; this retention was closely linked to the defendant's failure to appear at the hearing. The court dismissed 29% of cases at the initial hearing, closely linked to the defendant's presence at the hearing. In subsequent hearings of cases not dismissed, the court ordered the destruction of the firearms in 72% of cases, all when the individual did not appear in court, and dismissed 24% of the cases, all when the individual was present at the hearing."

=== Maine ===
Maine passed a law in effect from July 1, 2020, which allows police and prosecutors to seek permission from a court to confiscate dangerous weapons from people who pose a danger to themselves and others. This law is different from red flag laws in other states because it requires law enforcement to take someone into protective custody and facilitate a mental health assessment. This limitation is why the law in Maine is often called a "yellow flag law" and not considered a red flag law by groups such as Everytown for Gun Safety or organizations such as the Johns Hopkins Bloomberg School of Public Health National ERPO Resource Center.

=== Maryland ===
In Maryland, from October 1, 2018 (the date the law took effect) until late October 2020, the state courts granted 989 petitions for gun removal orders. Maryland courts grant slightly over half of the petitions filed. In the first three months of the state's law, about 60% of petitions were filed by family or household members, one petition was filed by a healthcare worker, and the rest were filed by police. In November 2018, a Maryland man was killed by Anne Arundel County police officers serving a removal order after refusing to surrender his firearms; police said that there was a struggle over the gun and a shot was fired before officers fatally shot the man.

=== New York ===
In New York, a total of 589 extreme risk protection orders were issued from 2019 (when the law took effect) through May 2022, a rate of about 18 orders per month. The New York state courts do not track the number of petitions for orders that are denied. After a gun massacre at a Buffalo supermarket in May 2022, in which ten people were killed, New York Governor Kathy Hochul issued an executive order requiring state police to file a petition when they believe, based on set criteria, that an individual presents a threat to themselves or others.

=== Oregon ===
In the first 22 months that Oregon's law was in effect (January 1, 2018 – October 31, 2019), 166 petitions were filed in Oregon for an extreme risk protection order. Of the 166 petitions, 112 were for people at risk of suicide and 39 related to domestic violence; 26 petitions involved both suicide risk and domestic violence. An Oregon Public Broadcasting review found that the petitions concerned individuals in crisis, with the majority of petitions citing "multiple factors such as threats of violence, use of physical force, owning or attempting to purchase deadly weapons, prior convictions and use of controlled substances." The Oregon courts granted 122 petitions (73% of those filed). The remaining 44 petitions (27% of those filed) did not result in the issuance of an order, either because a judge denied the petition (in 32 cases) or the request was withdrawn (in 12 cases). Counties varied widely in the level of usage of the process: most petitions were filed in Washington and Multnomah counties, respectively, while 11 counties did not issue any ERPOs and 7 counties issued a single ERPO.

=== Vermont ===
In the first 16 months that Vermont's law was in effect, the state courts issued about 30 extreme risk orders.

== Anti-red flag laws ==
=== Montana ===
On May 8, 2025 Montana Governor Greg Gianforte signed an Anti-Red Flag bill into law banning red flag laws in cities and/or municipalities throughout the state.

=== Oklahoma ===
In May 2020, Oklahoma became the first state to enact an anti-red flag law. The law specifically "prohibits the state or any city, county or political subdivision from enacting red flag laws."

=== Tennessee ===
On May 28, 2024 Tennessee Governor Bill Lee signed legislation preempting local municipalities from enforcing extreme risk protection orders (ERPOs).

=== Texas ===
On June 22, 2025 Texas Governor Greg Abbott signed an anti-red flag bill into law.

=== West Virginia ===
In 2021, West Virginia Governor Jim Justice signed the "West Virginia 2nd Amendment Preservation and Anti-Federal Commandeering Act" to say federal gun policy could not encroach on the state's policies. West Virginia's law describes red flag policies as "an anathema to law-abiding West Virginians who cherish their natural rights and liberties."

The law says no court in the state has the authority to issue an order taking away the guns or ammunition under a red flag law. The state law also forbids police from enforcing a red flag law "when the person against whom the order is directed has the lawful right under the laws of this state to possess firearms."

=== Wyoming ===
On March 22, 2024 Wyoming enacted an anti-red flag law.

== Federal legislative proposals ==
Senator Dianne Feinstein, Democrat of California, introduced a bill, the Extreme Risk Protection Order Act (S. 506), which would allow states to use grants to develop red flag laws. The legislation is supported by 25 Democratic senators and two Democratic-aligned independent senators. The legislation did not advance. Other bills were introduced by other members. (Note: Senator Marco Rubio, Republican of Florida, introduced a separate bipartisan bill that would use grants to encourage the passage of state red-flag laws. Senator Lindsey Graham, Republican of South Carolina, said in 2019 that he also planned to introduce legislation to encourage states to pass red flag laws. Another proposed federal red flag law is Representative John Katko's Protecting our Communities and Rights Act, which places on the State or petitioner "the burden of establishing by clear and convincing evidence that the respondent poses an imminent, particularized, and substantial risk of unlawfully using a firearm to cause death or serious physical injury to himself or herself or to another person." While campaigning for the Democratic nomination for president in 2019, Senator Kamala Harris of California called for legislation to create "domestic terrorism prevention orders," which would "give law enforcement and family members of suspected white nationalists or domestic terrorists the ability to petition a federal court to temporarily restrict a person's access to guns if the person exhibits clear evidence of being a danger." In states with red-flag laws, individuals making credible threats of violence can already be subject to gun-removal orders. Matt Olsen, former director of the National Counterterrorism Center during the Obama administration, has said that should Harris's proposal move forward, it would be important for the legislation to specify that a person cannot be deemed a domestic terrorist solely based on First Amendment-protected activity (such as openly stating white nationalist beliefs).)

S. 506 and other proposed bills would add persons subject to extreme risk protection orders to the list of "prohibited persons" in 18 U.S.C. § 922(g) (those persons who are prohibited from possessing a firearm). The legislation would thus make "it a federal crime for persons subject to the orders to possess firearms and for anyone else who has reasonable cause to know about the orders to sell or give firearms to them." In September 2019, following mass shootings in El Paso and Dayton, Ohio, the House Judiciary Committee approved amendments to the federal red flag bill to create a national red flag process.

In June 2022, the House passed the Federal Extreme Risk Protection Order Act of 2021 on a 224–202 vote, mostly along party lines. The bill would establish a national red-flag process for the federal district courts. In the House vote, 219 Democrats and 5 Republicans voted yes, 201 Republicans and 1 Democrat voted no, and 2 Republicans did not vote. (Note: The five Republicans who supported the bill were Representatives Brian Fitzpatrick of Pennsylvania, Anthony Gonzalez of Ohio, Chris Jacobs of New York, Adam Kinzinger of Illinois and Fred Upton of Michigan. Four of the five Republicans who voted "yes" had previously announced that they would not seek reelection in 2022. The one Democrat who voted against the bill was Representative Jared Golden of Maine.) The legislation was sponsored by Representative Lucy McBath, and passed the House in the aftermath of shooting massacres in Buffalo, New York and Uvalde, Texas.

The House-passed bill, as well as a package of other gun-control bills passed by the House (including a safe storage law, an increase in the minimum age to buy semi-automatic rifles to 21, a large-capacity magazine ban, and universal background checks), were blocked in the divided Senate, which is evenly split between the parties. However, a bipartisan group of Senators negotiated a significantly narrower bill that passed the Senate on June 23, 2022 The legislation, the Bipartisan Safer Communities Act of 2021, passed the Senate on a 65–33 vote was signed into law by President Joe Biden two days later on June 25, 2022. Among other provisions, the act allocates $750 million in federal funds to states to support the creation and maintenance of crisis intervention programs for state courts, including red-flag law programs (as well as mental health court, drug court, or veterans' court programs).

== Judicial review ==
Courts that have reviewed red flag laws prior to the United States Supreme Court's 2022 decision in New York State Rifle & Pistol Association, Inc. v. Bruen have rejected Second Amendment and Due Process challenges. In Hope v. State (2016), the Connecticut Appellate Court concluded that the state's firearm removal law does not violate the Second Amendment because "it does not restrict the right of law-abiding, responsible citizens to use arms in defense of their homes." The court considered the Connecticut statute to be "an example of the longstanding 'presumptively lawful regulatory measures'" permissible under the U.S. Supreme Court's decision in Heller v. District of Columbia. Similarly, in Redington v. State (2013), the Court of Appeals of Indiana concluded that Indiana's red-flag statute did not violate the right to keep and bear arms, was not an unconstitutional taking, and was not unconstitutionally vague. In Davis v. Gilchrist County Sheriff's Office (2019), the Florida First District Court of Appeal also rejected a challenge to Florida's red-flag law, holding that the law is constitutional and does not violate the right to due process. A lawsuit is pending challenging Nevada's red flag law.

However, in a post-Bruen case, a New York Supreme Court applying the Bruen decision ruled on December 22, 2022, that a New York red flag law was unconstitutional. A second judge on April 4, 2023, ruled it unconstitutional too.

In United States v. Rahimi (2024) the U.S. Supreme Court upheld a longstanding federal ban on firearms for people under domestic violence restraining orders, which are required to be reported to the national background check system.

== Support and opposition ==
=== Public opinion ===
An April 2018 poll found that 85% of registered voters support legislation that would "allow the police to take guns away from people who have been found by a judge to be a danger to themselves or others" (71% "strongly supported" while 14% "somewhat supported" such laws). State-level polling in Colorado and Michigan has shown similar levels of support. A PBS NewsHour/NPR/Marist Poll released in September 2019 showed that 72% of Americans supported the enactment of a federal red-flag law, while 23% were opposed.

=== Advocacy groups and elected officials ===
Democrats and some Republicans are receptive to these laws. Such laws are supported by groups that support gun control, such as Brady Campaign to Prevent Gun Violence and Everytown for Gun Safety. The latter group conducted a nationwide study showing that the perpetrators of mass shootings showed warning signs before the event 42% of the time.

Opponents of red flag laws argue that such legislation infringes on constitutional rights such as the right to bear arms and the right to be secure against unreasonable searches and seizures, and object to ex parte hearings. There has been debate about how soon after the ex parte hearing the adversarial hearing should be held. For example, in Virginia, state senator Glen Sturtevant argued that the legislature should consider requiring an adversarial hearing on the order within 48 hours, rather than within 14 days. Jacob Sullum, a columnist for Reason magazine, questioned "the very concept of 'red flags'" and whether "experts can reliably distinguish between harmless oddballs and future murderers," and, citing a 2012 Department of Defense study, stated that "even if certain 'red flags' are common among mass shooters, almost none of the people who display those signs are bent on murderous violence."

The National Rifle Association (NRA) had previously argued that red flag laws unnecessarily hamper the right to due process of individuals who are restrained by them, and worked to defeat such legislation in Utah and Maryland. In a March 2018 policy reversal, the NRA suggested that it might support such laws, but conditioned any openness to such laws on an extensive list of conditions, including a judicial finding by "clear and convincing evidence" that the person poses a significant risk of danger. The NRA did not identify any federal or state red flag laws that it supported, and even after its March 2018 announcement continued to work to defeat or weaken red flag bills introduced in state legislatures. In summer 2018, the NRA mobilized to defeat red-flag legislation proposed in Pennsylvania because it objected to allowing initial hearings ex parte. In Arizona in 2019, the NRA ghostwrote an opinion piece for sheriffs to submit to the local press stating their opposition to the legislation. A 2019 study by gun rights advocate John Lott found red flag laws have no significant effect on murder, suicide, the number of people killed in mass public shootings, robbery, aggravated assault, or burglary.

The ACLU of Rhode Island argued against such a law, stating that "People who are not alleged to have committed a crime should not be subject to severe deprivations of liberty interests... in the absence of a clear, compelling and immediate showing of need. As well-intentioned as this legislation is, its breadth and its lenient standards for both applying for and granting an ERPO are cause for great concern."

Some counties and cities have adopted "Second Amendment sanctuary" resolutions in opposition to red flag laws. As of 2019, some 75 jurisdictions have declared themselves sanctuaries that oppose emergency protection orders and enforcement of gun background checks, at times with assistance from the NRA.

In the wake of the El Paso, Texas shooting and Dayton, Ohio shooting of August 3 and 4, 2019, President Donald Trump called on states to implement red flag laws to help remove guns from "those judged to pose a grave risk to public safety." However, Trump did not endorse any particular piece of legislation, and Republican Senate Majority Leader Mitch McConnell has said he would allow gun legislation to be brought to the Senate floor only if it gained Trump's support. Gun rights groups mounted a campaign to discourage Trump from supporting red-flag laws or other gun-control measures, saying that pushing for red flag laws could cost Trump the 2020 presidential election. In November 2019, Trump abandoned the idea of putting forth red-flag law proposals or other legislation to curtail gun violence.

== See also ==
- Gun laws in the United States by state
- Gun politics in the United States
- Public opinion on gun control in the United States
