= 2024 Maine Question 5 =

Maine Question 5
- November 5, 2024
- Do you favor making the former state flag, replaced as the official flag of the State in 1909 and commonly known as the Pine Tree Flag, the official flag of the State?
- Proposed flag design

Results
| Choice | Votes | % |
|---|---|---|
| Yes | 358,912 | 44.29% |
| No | 451,366 | 55.71% |

No
90–100%
80–90%
70–80%
60–70%
50–60%
Yes
60–70%
50–60%

The 2024 Maine flag referendum (formally known as Question 5) was a legislatively referred state statute held on November 5, 2024, that sought to change the official state flag from the current version, first enacted in 1909, to a variation of the 1901 flag. (Note: Itself, a variation of the Pine Tree Flag, and occasionally referred to by that name.)

The referendum was held concurrently with four other referendum questions, as well as the presidential election, a U.S. Senate election, U.S. House elections for Maine's two congressional districts, and various other state, county and local elections.

The referendum saw the new flag rejected by 56% to 44%.

== Background ==
Official flag (1909–present)

The referendum had initially been scheduled for 2023, but the Maine Legislature delayed it until 2024. The Legislature then attempted a further delay until 2026, which was vetoed by Governor Janet Mills. On August 5, 2024, the winner of the flag redesign contest was announced, with honors going to Adam Lemire of Gardiner, Maine. His design, chosen out of more than 400 entries, features a pine tree modeled after one he saw in Viles Arboretum in Augusta, Maine. It has sixteen branches, one for each of Maine's counties.

== Supporters ==
Supporters of this referendum, such as former representative Sean Paulhus argue that "We are the pine tree state, and I think it is a good representative, all-inclusive design, our state flag currently with a blue background in our state seal looks very similar to many other state flags, as do New Hampshire's, Vermont's, Pennsylvania's, and New York's."

Supporters

State legislators

- Eric Brakey, state senator (2014–2018, 2022–present)
- Sean Paulhus, former state representative (2019–2023)

Media

- Bangor Daily News

== Opponents ==
Opponents of the referendum, such as representative Billy Bob Faulkingham, argue that "it goes back to Civil War significance to have that blue flag. The sailor and the farmer have historical significance back to the roots of the state of Maine, and that's what they represent."

Opponents

State legislators

- Billy Bob Faulkingham, House minority leader (2022–present)
- Shelley Rudnicki, state representative

== Result ==
The referendum, held as part of the 2024 United States elections, saw the proposed flag rejected by 56% to 44%.
