= Flag of Massachusetts =

U.S. state flag

Commonwealth of Massachusetts
- Use: Civil and state flag
- Proportion: Not specified
- Adopted: March 18, 1908; 118 years ago (initial version) 1971; 55 years ago (current design)
- Design: A state coat of arms on a white field.
- Flag of the governor of Massachusetts
- Use: State flag
- Design: State flag in the form of a pennant.
- Massachusetts ensign
- Use: Naval ensign
- Adopted: 1971; 55 years ago
- Design: A green tree on a white field.

The flag of the Commonwealth of Massachusetts was adopted on March 18, 1908, and has only been changed once in 1971 with the removal of the reverse side. The flag features the coat of arms of the Commonwealth on a white field. The state currently has three official flags: a state flag, a governor's flag, and a "naval and maritime flag" (despite it no longer having its own naval militia).

With Florida, it is one of only two state flags to prominently feature a Native American. The flag of Minnesota also featured a Native American until 2024.

== Statute ==
The 2023 Massachusetts General Laws, Part I, Title I, Chapter 2, § 3 defines that the flag of the Commonwealth shall consist of:

...a white rectangular field, bearing on either side a representation of the arms of the Commonwealth, except that the star shall be white

Chapter 2, section 5, further designates the Secretary of the Commonwealth as custodian of the Commonwealth's arms, seal, and flags, and requires all representations to conform to specifications adopted in 1971.

=== Design of the coat of arms ===
The law defining the coat of arms of the commonwealth (MA Gen L ch 2 § 1) states that it shall consist of:

...a blue shield with an Indian thereon, dressed in a shirt, leggings, and moccasins, holding in his right hand a bow, and in his left hand an arrow, point downward, all of gold; and, in the upper right-hand corner of the field a silver star of five points. The crest shall be, on a wreath of gold and blue, a right arm, bent at the elbow, clothed and ruffled, and grasping a broad-sword, all of gold. The motto Ense petit placidam sub libertate quietem shall appear in gold on a blue ribbon.

== Design and symbolism ==
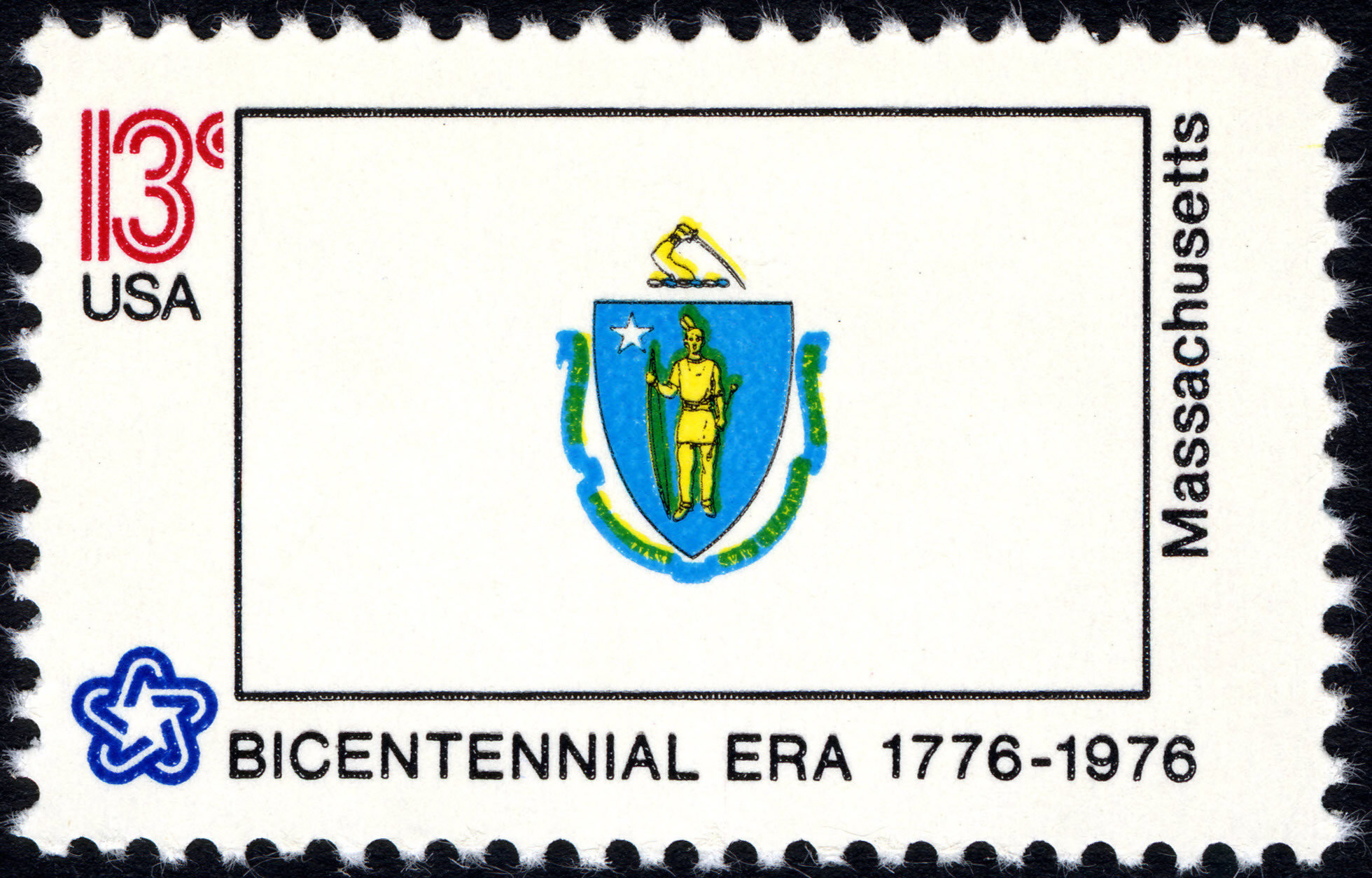
The Massachusetts state flag as depicted in the 1976 bicentennial postage stamp series.

The shield is meant to depict an Algonquian Native American with bow and arrow; the arrow is pointed downward, signifying peace. A white star with five points appears next to the figure's head, signifying Massachusetts as a U.S. state, or as one of the 13 original states. A blue ribbon surrounds the shield, bearing the state motto Ense Petit Placidam, Sub Libertate Quietem ("By the Sword We Seek Peace, But Peace Only Under Liberty").

The current graphic form, based on earlier colonial and Revolutionary imagery, was drawn by artist Edmund H. Garrett and adopted in 1900. The figure on the shield, as standardized in 1890, is a composite whose head was modeled after the Ojibwe leader Thomas Little Shell.

Above the shield is the state military crest: the bent arm holding a broadsword aloft. The sword has its blade up, to remind that it was through the American Revolution that liberty was won. The sword itself is a copy of one belonging to Myles Standish and signifies the philosophy that one would rather lose their right arm than live under tyranny.

== History ==
=== Pre-statutory usage ===
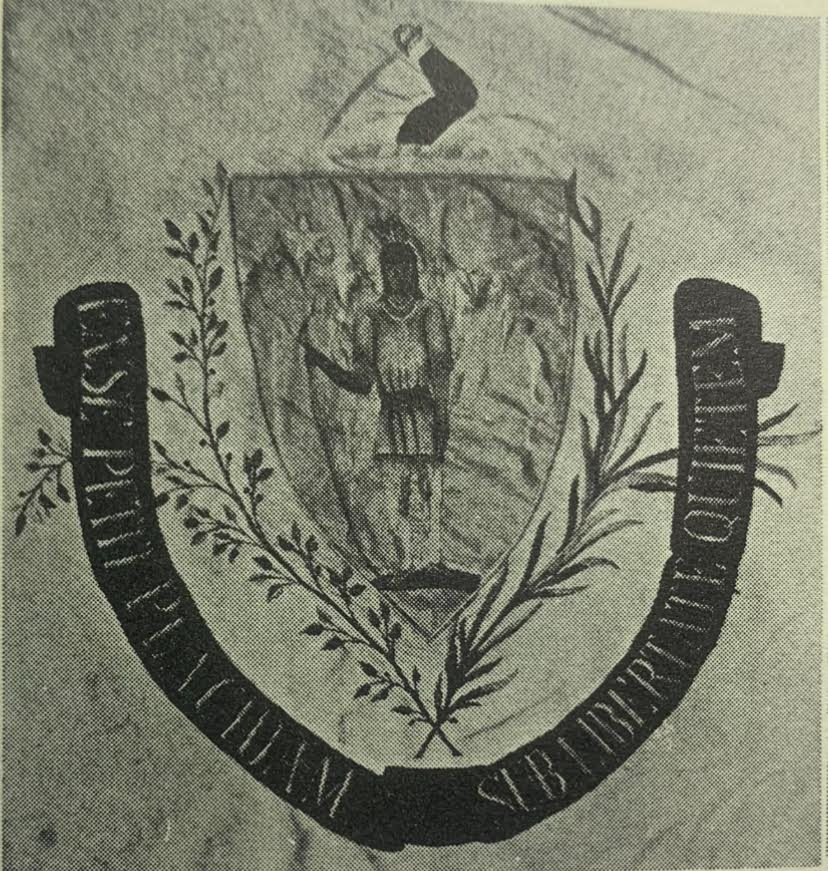
State flag used by a Veterans group during the Nineteenth century (Obverse). It was made by a group of women from Salem.

Sources indicate that a flag representing Massachusetts was in official use decades before the adoption of a statutory design. It appears to have been a loosely standardized white flag displaying the Commonwealth's arms or seal, used primarily by the state government for official and ceremonial purposes.

References to a "State flag" appear as early as January 1860, when a flag bearing the state coat of arms was flown over the Massachusetts State House in place of the United States flag, prompting criticism from some citizens who believed the national flag had been improperly displaced. The same report was reprinted in a North Carolina newspaper in 1863.

During the American Civil War, each Massachusetts volunteer regiment carried a white flag bearing the state seal alongside the national flag. The 9th and 28th Massachusetts Volunteer Infantry, the state's "Irish regiments," instead carried green flags bearing a gold harp.

Throughout the late nineteenth century, the flag appeared at gubernatorial appearances, political conventions and at the Chicago World's Fair. The flag was consistently described as having a white field charged with the Massachusetts coat of arms or state seal. Despite its official use, the flag appears to have been uncommon. In 1892, officials were unable to locate a state flag for Governor William E. Russell's visit aboard Commodore Elbridge T. Gerry's yacht until one was borrowed from Fort Warren.

In 1906, Governor Curtis Guild Jr. stated that most state flags then in use were incorrect, explaining that the proper design displayed the regular state arms on the obverse, while the reverse featured a shield with a pine tree instead, with the surrounding scrollwork remaining identical. Flags commonly in use displayed the same image on both sides. Both the obverse and reverse were, per the Governor's description, further decorated with intertwined sprays of laurel and palm.

=== Current flag (1908–present) ===
The reverse side of the flag from 1908 to 1971

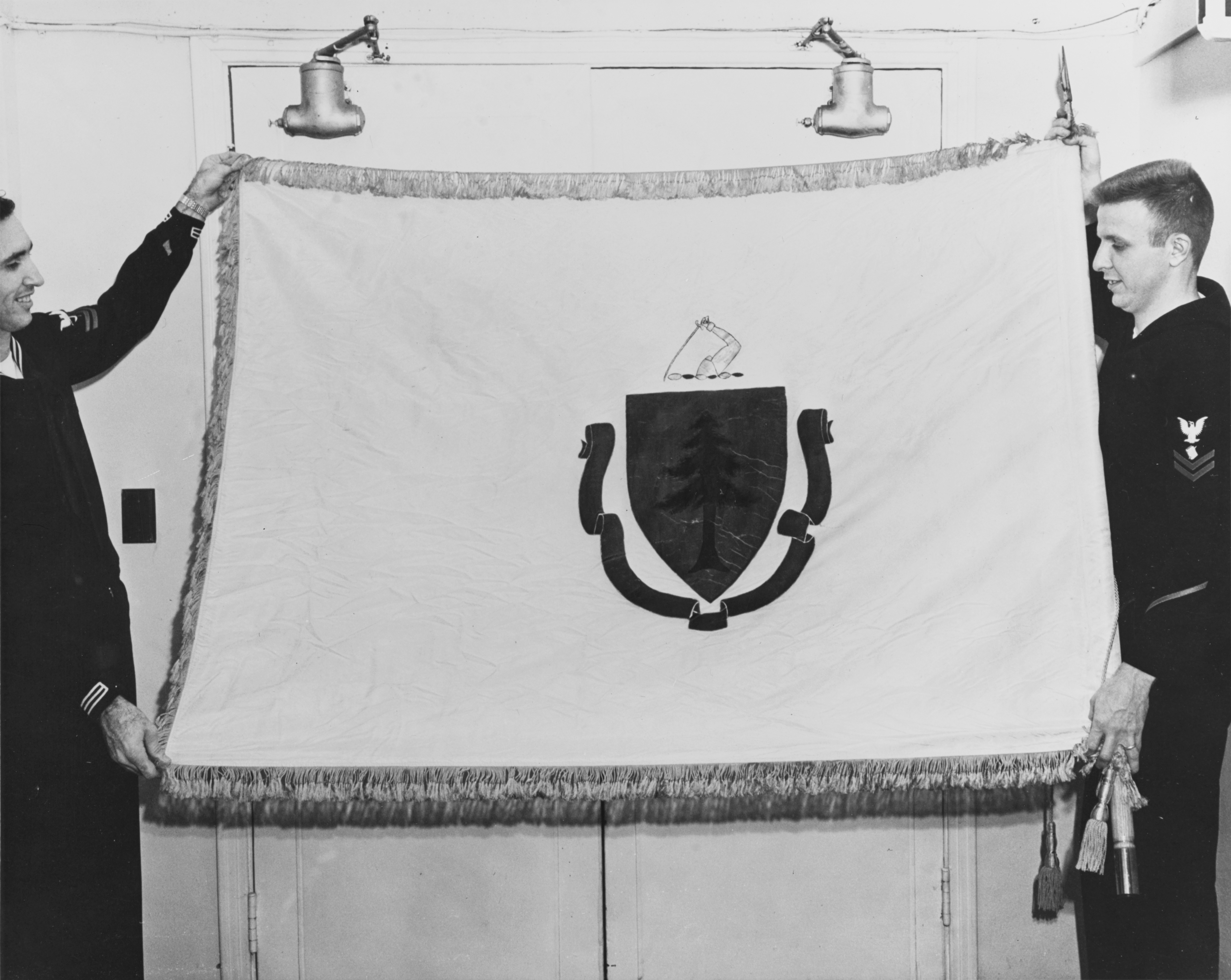
Two sailors inspect a state flag after its removal from USS Massachusetts in July 1962

The state flag of Massachusetts was adopted by statute in 1908, approved March 18, 1908. The measure fulfilled a long-standing effort by Governor Curtis Guild Jr., who had advocated to place the flag on a statutory basis and raised the issue in his January 1908 address to the Legislature.

In that address, Guild described the flag of Massachusetts as already existing in practice, noting its use above the State House and alongside the national flag. He noted that the flag could be altered at any time by a governor, and therefore urged that it be permanently preserved by statute so that any future changes would require legislative approval.

The resulting legislation, introduced as Senate Bill No. 269 as part of the Governor's address, moved quickly through both chambers during early March 1908, appearing on the Orders of the Day on March 6 and March 9, and being enacted in the House on March 11.

Following its adoption, Governor Guild ordered the flag to be flown above all public state buildings and institutions.

Originally, the flag had a reverse side that featured a green pine on a blue shield, which Governor Guild had recommended. In 1971, the reverse side was removed.

In 1917, a flag of this design, per description, was referred to as the personal flag of the governor. Modern law (Massachusetts General Laws, chapter 2, section 4) states that the governor's flag shall conform to the design of the state flag, except that it is to be triangular in shape.

== Naval and maritime flag ==
In April 1776, the Massachusetts State Navy adopted, as its flag (naval ensign), a white field charged with a green pine tree and the motto "An Appeal to Heaven." In 1971 the motto was removed, and the flag was designated "the naval and maritime flag of the Commonwealth".

Massachusetts is one of only three states with its own maritime ensign. The second is Maine, which was part of Massachusetts until 1820. Third and last is South Carolina, which activated her navy twice: first during the American Revolutionary War and again during the American Civil War.

The Massachusetts naval ensign from 1776 to 1971

The current ensign from 1971 onwards

== Flags associated with Massachusetts ==
The English Red Ensign, the first flag flown by the Massachusetts Bay Colony. In use from 1620–1708.

A variant red ensign commonly used in the Massachusetts Bay Colony. Saint George's Cross was removed for religious reasons. In use primarily from 1634–1686.

The personal standard of Edmund Andros, used as flag of the Dominion of New England. Flown over Boston from 1686–1689 until the Boston Revolt.

A flag (and ensign) of New England, used by merchant ships sailing out of New England ports. In use 1686–1775.

Flown by the Province of Massachusetts Bay after the 1707 Acts of Union. The Flag of Great Britain replaces the English flag in the canton. In use 1708–1775.

Variant of the New England variant of the red ensign, redesigned to incorporate the Union Flag. In use 1708–1775.

Flag of New England with the British symbols removed from the canton. In use as a flag of New England 1775–present.

== Attempts to change the flag ==
=== Special Commission (2021–2023) ===
On January 11, 2021, Governor Charlie Baker signed a bill establishing a commission to change the state flag and seal by October 1, 2021, that will "faithfully reflect and embody the historic and contemporary commitments of the Commonwealth to peace, justice, liberty and equality and to spreading the opportunities and advantages of education." The bill was previously approved by the Massachusetts Senate on July 28, 2020. The Special Commission on Massachusetts Flag and Seal (Special Commission to Investigate the Features of the Official Seal and Motto of the Commonwealth) first met in July 2021. In April 2022 the Commission voted to ask the state legislature to extend the deadline for completion of the commission's work to March 31, 2023 In May 2022, the Commission recommended changing the seal, motto, and flag; however the Commission failed to agree upon a proposal. With lawmakers not having extended the deadline past December 31, 2022, and the commission's own deadline having expired at the end of March 2023, as well as UMass Amherst polling showing lukewarm support for a change, the issue appeared to be closed for the time. In 2023, the commission concluded without recommending specific replacements for either flag or seal, although the commission’s co-chair, Brian Boyles, emphasized that he and his colleagues had made significant progress regarding this issue.

=== Seal, Flag, and Motto Advisory Commission (2024–present) ===
On July 29, 2024, Governor Maura Healey signed a budget amendment to change the state flag, seal, and motto. Public proposals were invited during May and June 2025, resulting in 1,165 submissions, with the Commission narrowing down the submissions to 48 semi-finalists. Of the 48 semi-finalist designs, background fields were most commonly white (21), blue (16), and cranberry (9). Overall, blue appeared in 39 designs and white in 35. Common motifs included five-point stars (30), pine trees (18; eight of which appeared on blue shields), mayflowers (6), lighthouses (4), waves (6), and whale tails (5). Thirteen designs featured exactly six five-point stars. Gold and green were primarily used as accents in stars, suns, or trees, with green mainly for pine trees.

The Commission publicized three flag proposals on August 28, 2025: one banner depicting Great Blue Hill, with six waves and an eight-pointed star; a mayflower bearing petals shaped as the current flag's shield, with its bud formed from a six-pointed gold star; and six turkey feathers arranged in a circle on a crimson background.

On June 25, 2026, three additional entries were presented, selected from the semi-finalist designs.

== See also ==
- Symbols of the Commonwealth of Massachusetts
- Flags of governors of the U.S. states
- Flag of New England
- Pine Tree Flag
