= Flag of New England =

New England
- Use: Regional, Cultural flag and ensign
- Adopted: Seventeenth century, de facto
- Design: Red Ensign with a pine tree on a white field in the canton.
- Use: Regional, Cultural flag and ensign
- Design: Red Ensign with St. George's Cross with a pine tree in the top left corner in the Canton.
- Bunker Hill Flag
- Use: Regional, Cultural flag and ensign
- Design: Blue Ensign with St. George's Cross with a pine tree in the top left corner in the Canton.

New England has no official flag. However, there have been many historical or modern banners used to represent the region in its history. While there are some variations, common designs include a plain colored field (usually red) with a pine tree in the canton. The eastern white pine (Pinus strobus) is the most common and prominent symbol of New England and is featured on many of the region's flags.

== Design ==
The flag of New England has two prominent symbols: a pine tree and red color. Other features, like the St. George's Cross, are not always displayed on the flag, but the pine almost always is. There is a blue ensign and a red ensign variant. In each, Saint George's Cross is in the canton, whose top left corner is defaced with an image of a pine. Sometimes the blue ensign is defaced with six stars in a circle symbolizing the six states of New England. Another variant has a red ensign with an image of a pine tree over a white field in the canton, and contains no cross; which is commonly used by the New England Revolution Major League Soccer team. The red ensign was a common banner for other American colonies as well, but the addition of a pine tree distinguished the New England colonies from their neighbors.

== History ==
=== Background and early designs ===
English Red Ensign

The origin of the New England flag lay with the Red Ensign of the Royal Navy. The red ensign was first used in 1625, with merchant vessels being granted its usage by 1663. Although it was an official flag of Great Britain there was no official or standardized design of the banner. What was consistent was all the flags featured the Cross of St. George. These designs sometimes greatly varied by location, the type of vessel flying the flag, the rank of the commanding officer of the vessel, or the position of the vessel within the royal fleet.

The lack of uniformity of the red ensign existed with land forces of the British Empire as well. In North America, the colonists relied for a large part on their own militias for security and defense. The same issues with naval flags were also found here. The designs of the flags changed by location. This included style, color of the ensigns' field, and any defacements. As with the military on the British Isles, the colonists' military banners corresponded more to an individual commander rather than an emblem of a national force. Colonial militias were relatively limited in size compared to the larger forces in Britain and so these changes never exceeded the defacements found on company sized regiments. Defacements could include circles, flames, or any distinguishing mark. Each regiment also had a particular color associated with it. A company with a green ensign could be referred to as the "green regiment", a blue ensign referred to as the "blue regiment", and so on. These differences are evident in colonial flags in the New England Colonies. Greens ensigns are associated with Newburyport and red ensigns were flown in the Massachusetts Bay Colony and Saybrook Colony for some units.

=== Puritan religious influence ===
Bedford Flag

Puritan influence can be seen on some company and settlement banners as well. Influenced by the Commonwealth of England and the parliamentary forces of the English Civil War, some flags in New England bore similar motifs and symbols. One of the Newburyport green ensigns depicted mailed hands arranged in a circle, which is a symbol of the divine in Puritan iconography. As Puritan militias grew in size, more units necessitated additional banners. Around 1652 new cavalry regiments were created. Examples of such flags are the "Three County Troop" flag or the militia flag, known today as the Bedford Flag. These banners depicted an armored arm reaching from the heavens holding a sword. This was a symbol also seen in the English Civil War and was supposed to symbolize divine justice being carried out in defense of true believers. Other Puritan and religious symbols such as anchors, grapevines, oak trees were also flown. Grapevines were prominent in the Connecticut and Saybrook colonies, and remain on the current state of Connecticut's flag and state seal. The anchor, a symbol of hope and providence, was common in Rhode Island and is still a symbol of the state today. Other symbols that can be seen as derived from Oliver Cromwell's New Model Army are hearts (Worcester, Massachusetts), and the motif of an armored divine arm still exists in Massachusetts today as a component of the state's official seal as the crest, and well as the symbol of the Massachusetts National Guard (the Massachusetts National Guard contains the oldest units in the United States Army and is a direct successor/continuation of these early militias).

The use of the red ensign with the flag of England in the canton was controversial in the region. The cross of St. George was seen by many Puritans as a symbol of the Papacy and hence a symbol of heresy. Reverend William Hubbard was an early opponent of the use of the cross on New England banners. Roger Williams, a prominent religious leader then based in Salem declared the symbol counter to the Reformation and a vestige of papal authority over the king. John Endicott who was inspired by Williams and then a member of the Council of Assistants ordered that the cross be cut out from flags in the colony. Richard Davenport of Watertown, the bearer of the flag was to be the one to remove it. A freeman of the colony named Richard Browne was disturbed by this and feared it could signal to authorities in England that the colonists were rebelling. Browne brought the matter before the Great and General Court of Massachusetts Bay. The Council of Assistants reviewed the matter and the case was dismissed against Endicott and Davenport. The General Court did rule however that the defaced flag was not to be used in any official capacity. The controversy remained, and some units refused to train for militia duty under a flag bearing St George's Cross.

Red Ensign stripped of the Cross of St. George

In 1636 the General Court made another ruling concerning banners in the colony. It ordered that commissioners be made to standardize military banners. The commissioners ordered that the cross-less banners be used. An exception to the cross-less flags would be on Castle Island. The fort, which was Boston's main defense naval fort, would be seen by all ships entering Boston harbor and therefore it was considered necessary for an English flag to be flown there. For a time, a version of the red ensign with the Royal Standard of Charles I in place of the cross of St. George was used, but this practice ended following the outbreak of the Civil War in 1642 and the eventual abolition of the monarchy in 1649. In 1651, the Commonwealth of England's Puritan parliament officially revived the standard red ensign, emphasizing the need for the flag to be used in Boston. To not fly the colors in such a manner could be seen as rebellious. Governor John Winthrop therefore ordered that the red ensign containing the cross be kept on Castle Island for this reason.

The issue of the cross-less flag remained unresolved in 1665. Royal Commissioners arrived in the colony and delivered a royal edict demanding the standard ensign be flown. Their demands were not met and the red ensign with the blank canton continued to be used in the colony. Some leading moderates in the colony sought to restore the use of the standard ensign. According to the moderates, the symbol was not a religious one but a political one. Though the cross had idolatrous origins, the Reformation, they claimed, stripped these issues away. By the 1680s the moderates won out and the standard ensign containing the cross was restored. Some New Englanders were still not wholly comfortable with its presence. Judge Samuel Sewall, who ordered the royal ensign be restored wrote in his diary, "I was and am in great exercise about the Cross to be put into the Colours, and afraid if I should have a hand in 't whether it may not hinder my Entrance into the Holy Land."

=== Pine tree flags ===
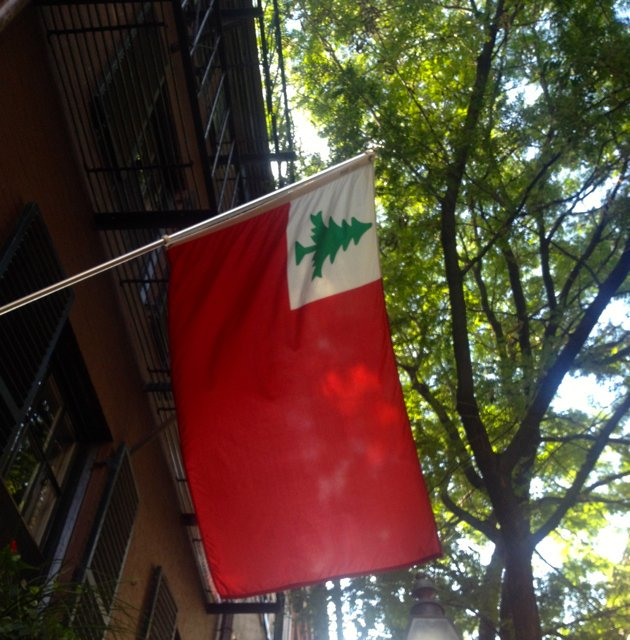
New England Red Ensign hanging

The most enduring symbol of New England iconography is the Pine tree. New Englanders wished to further distinguish themselves from other parts of the Empire and so made an addition to the flag. This new design would use the cross of St George but would also contain the image of a tree in the top left corner of the flag. The first recorded sighting of the flag came from Jack Graydon in 1686 and was featured in his book Insignia Navalia by Lt. Graydon, 1686, where the ensign is referred to as "The Red Flag of New England". Other sources such as John Beaumont's The Present State of the Universe from 1701 also portrays an English flag defaced with a tree. Along with some French and Dutch sources, it appears towards the end of the 17th century this design was growing more popular for New England ships. Some accounts say there is an Oak rather than a pine (Oak trees were seen on other New England flags such as the "Moulton Flag"), and others describe a globe or armillary sphere. It is not clear what exactly is the case however since some of these accounts may have been from poor sourcing or a misinterpretation of an illustration.

Queen Anne in 1708 ordered that all British vessels use the British Ensign. This new version would have the flag of the Kingdom of Great Britain in its canton rather than the English one. Despite this, many New England vessels continued to fly the older version with the pine tree defacement. A version of the New England flag that aims to fit these new specifications seems to have also existed. In 1768 an illustration featuring a colonist holding a banner showed this design. The colonist, dressed in hunting clothes and wearing a phrygian cap, holds a flag which is an ensign of the Kingdom of Great Britain with a pine tree on a white background in the top left corner. This period in New England's history also marked a shift in political feeling. With the Massachusetts Bay Colony and the Plymouth Colony, the distinction New Englanders felt from Great Britain was chiefly a religious one. They saw themselves as a separate nation founded on Puritan religious teaching that was attempting to establish a pure society. As the New England settlements grew, Puritan based separatism waned with a want for greater political and commercial autonomy taking its place. One chief reason for the reorganization of the Plymouth and Massachusetts Bay colonies into the Dominion of New England and the province of Massachusetts Bay was the inhabitants of New England were not abiding by the crown's trade policy and political mandates. The New England colonies were largely autonomous with an emphasis on direct democracy and localized authority. These attitudes can be seen as a driving force for New Englanders to create a flag of their own and as a symbol of their independent attitudes. Despite the attempts by Great Britain to further standardize the usage of the ensign of Great Britain, New England pine flags were still flown at the time. One such example is a New England pine flag with a gold or a buff field which was flown in the Connecticut Colony.

Massachusetts navy flag

The Red Flag of New England

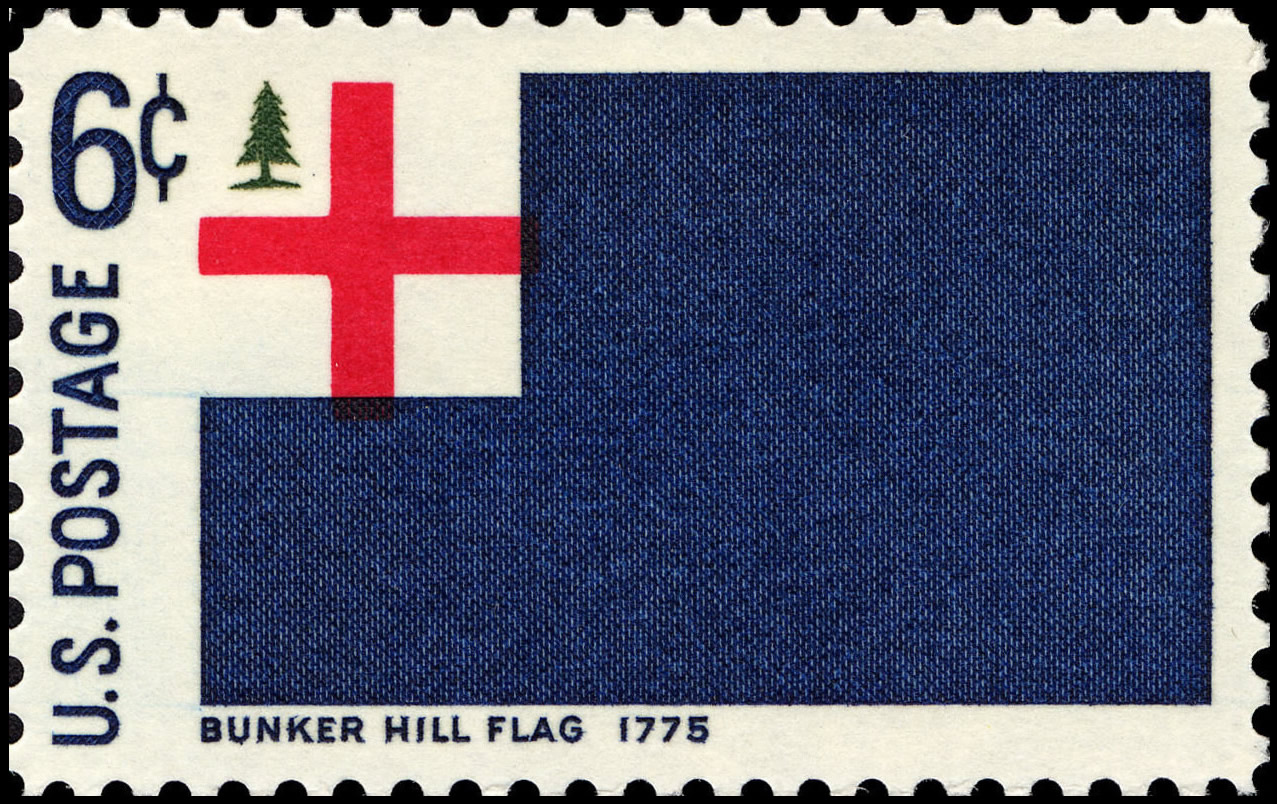
1968 US stamp featuring the Bunker Hill Flag

The pine tree had initially represented the forests of New England, but by the early 1700s it also symbolized home rule; in 1691, 1711, 1722, and 1729, Parliament had passed laws with increasingly harsh punishments on those who would cut down pine trees in New England, but the colonists stubbornly resisted their enforcement. By the time of the American Revolution the pine flags gained more prominence. Pine flags were seen on Patriot New Englander naval vessels off the coast of Nova Scotia and on the Charles River. There are varying designs for these flags. These flags were red ensigns and featured an image of a pine, sometimes having the Cross of St. George and sometimes without it. The banners without the cross were reminiscent of the blank ensign of the Massachusetts Bay Colony however the blank field was now defaced with a green pine.

Some controversy exists concerning which flag flew at the Battle of Bunker Hill in 1775 at the onset of the American Revolutionary War. An officer of the Royal Marines reported that no flags were used by the Americans, but John Trumbull placed a red flag with a pine tree in his 1786 painting The Death of General Warren at the Battle of Bunker's Hill, June 17, 1775. However, he later painted another version of this painting for the family of the fallen general which depicts a blue flag. Another variation commonly used to represent the battle has a blue field with a white canton, the canton quartered with St. George's Cross and a tree.

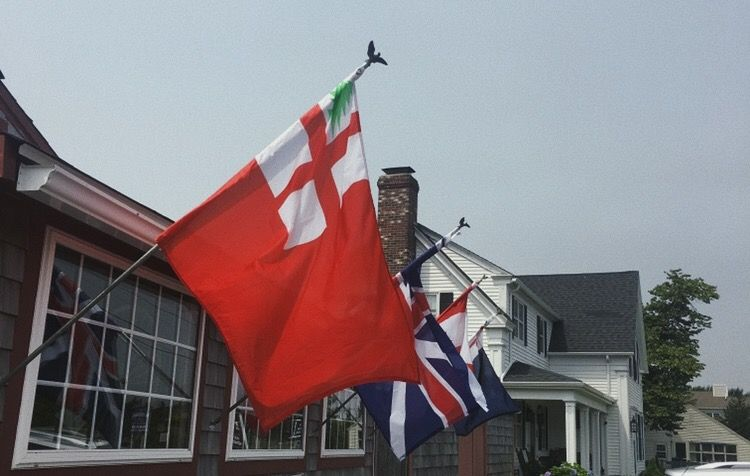
The flag of New England in Massachusetts

According to author Boleslaw Mastai, a specialist in American antiquities, the blue field was due to an error in a wood engraving which caused confusion among painters. The printing error might have been caused by incorrect "hatching", whereby parallel lines represent heraldic tinctures or colors; horizontal lines represent blue and vertical ones represent red. However, Benson John Lossing writes in Field Book of the Revolution that he interviewed the daughter of a Bunker Hill veteran who told her that he hoisted a blue flag on Breed's Hill prior to the battle. Regardless of its authenticity, the blue variation has become a symbol of the Battle of Bunker Hill and also of Charlestown, Boston, the neighborhood encompassing Bunker and Breed's hills. It was also featured on a 1968 US Postage Stamp.

There were other pine flags flown in the region as well. One of the most well known examples is the Pine Tree Flag, sometimes known as the "Appeal to Heaven" flag. This flag was the ensign of the Massachusetts Bay Navy and the early colonial patriot naval force. This flag was not used outside of New England as it was not deemed suitable to represent the entire United Colonies, with the pine being so strongly associated with New England and Massachusetts Bay in particular.

== Other flags ==
A flag designed by William Cork was presented to Le Congres Mondial Acadien in Nova Scotia in 2004. Cork's flag was presented on behalf of the Acadian New Englanders who were attending the congress. The New England Acadian flag features a redesigned Flag of Acadia tricolor with blue and white vertical stripes becoming sideways triangles. The flag features the traditional "Star of the Sea" in the blue stripe, and in the white stripe a traditional New England pine.

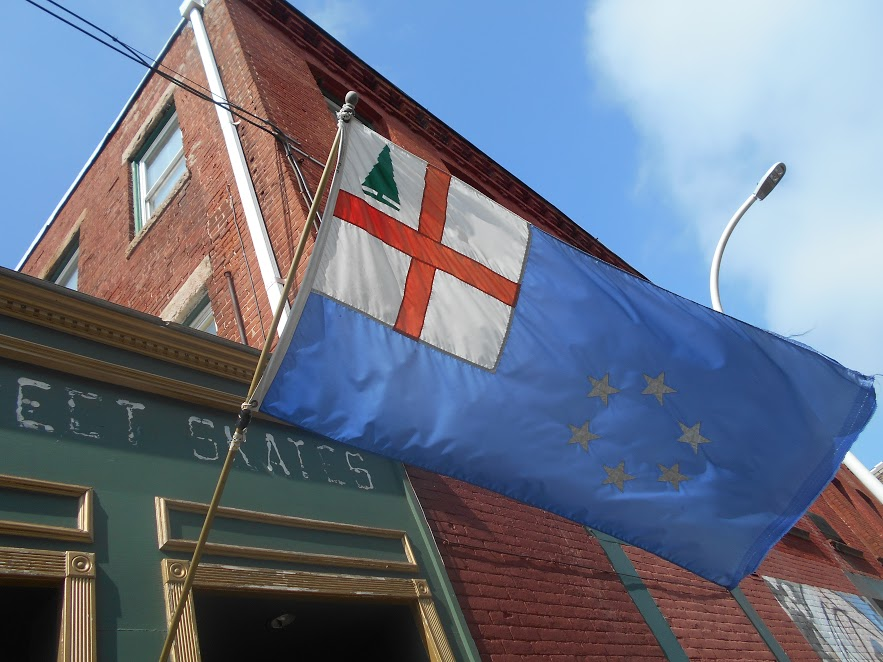
Flag adopted by the New England Governors' Conference

On June 8, 1998, K. Albert Ebinger of Ipswich, Massachusetts made a presentation to the New England Governor's Conference (NEGC) promoting a new design as the official flag of the NEGC. It is the blue "Bunker Hill Flag" defaced with six five-pointed stars in a circle in the fly to represent the six New England states. Ebinger had copyrighted this design in 1965, which the NEGC was unaware of when they adopted it. The New England Vexillological Association sent a letter of concern to the NEGC, which responded:

In 1998, Mr. Ebinger appeared before the New England Governors' Conference, in Fredericton, New Brunswick, Canada during the annual Conference of New England Governors and Eastern Canadian Premiers and suggested [that] the promotion of New England tourism would benefit from the use of a common symbol, such as his "New England Flag". At that meeting, the governors approved a motion to adopt the flag as the "official emblem of the New England Conference". They did not make any claims as to its legitimacy as an official or authentic flag of the six-state region, nor did they adopt it as the official flag of the region.

== Gallery ==
Flags with modern usage

Flag of New England with the pine tree in the canton

Red Ensign with Saint George's Cross in the canton

Blue Ensign of New England, also known as the Bunker Hill flag

Blue ensign, field defaced with six stars. Flag of the New England Governor's Conference

New England Acadians

Flag of the New England Vexillological Association

Historical flags

Red Ensign of the Kingdom of England

Blue Ensign of the Kingdom of England

Red ensign with cross removed

Naval jack drawn by John Graydon in 1686, consisting of Saint George's Cross with a pine tree in the canton.

Endecott Flag of early New England

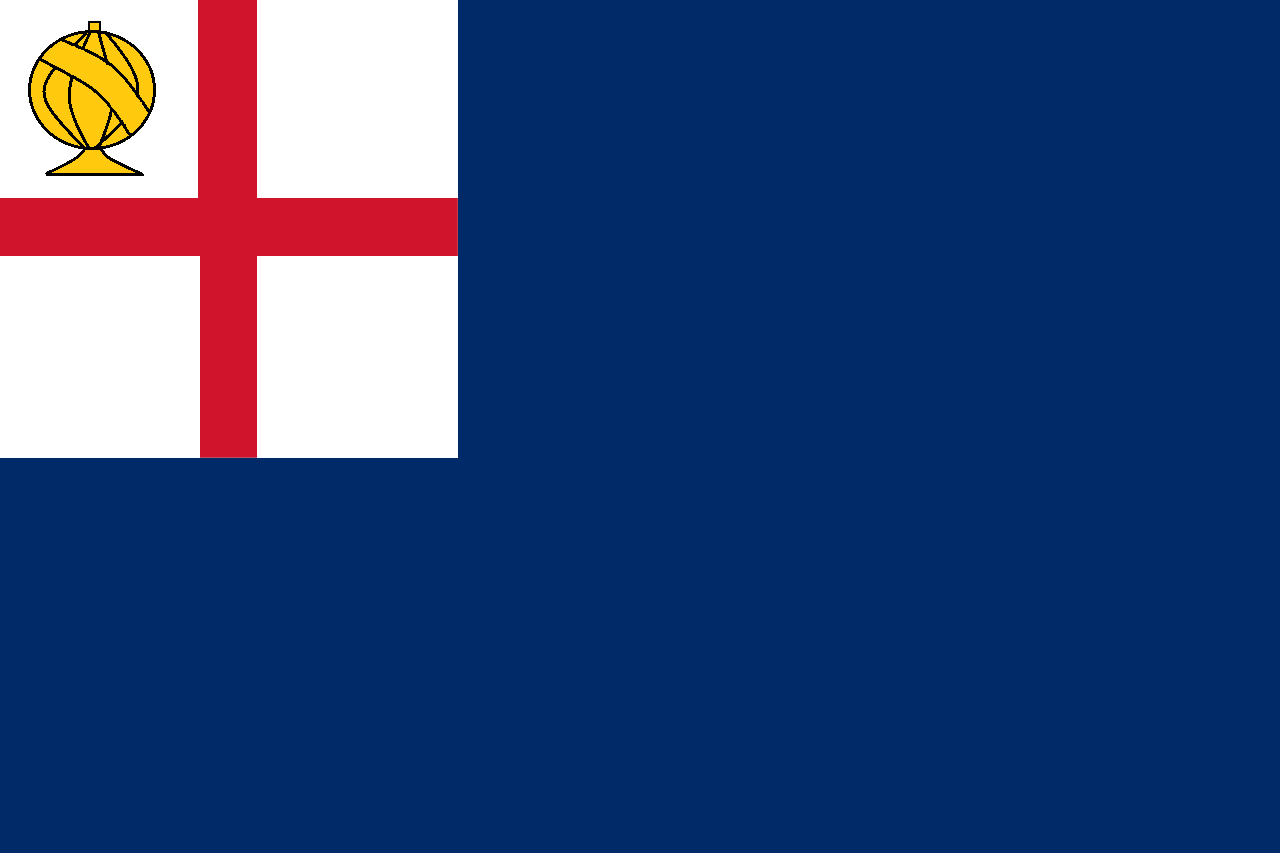
Blue ensign variant with armillary sphere in canton instead of the Pine

New England variant of the Union Flag

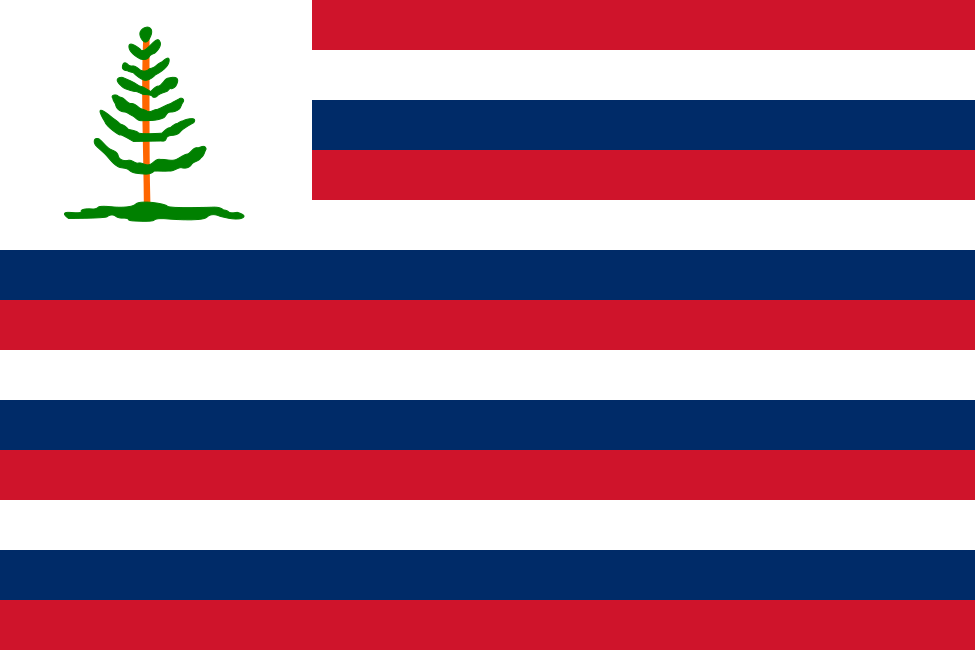
Revolutionary War variant flag of New England

Revolutionary War variant flag of New England

Dominion of New England banner, also known as the Andros Flag

New England Green Ensign

New England green ensign after defacement

Military

Pine Tree Flag of the Massachusetts Bay Navy

An Appeal to Heaven variant flag from the American Revolution

New England Buff banner. Flown by Connecticut militia

Bedford Flag

Saybrook militia

Suffolk militia Major's regiment

Suffolk militia Lieutenant colonel's regiment

Suffolk militia Colonel's regiment

Territorial

Lincoln County, Maine

Haverhill, Massachusetts, green ensign defaced with town seal

Newbury, Massachusetts

Others

An incorrect Colonial Flag never used by the Colonies of New England before the Revolutionary War

Related flags

1901 Maine Flag

Maine ensign

Ensign of Massachusetts

Flag of the Iroquois, showing use of the pine

Flag of Massachusetts reverse (1908–1971)

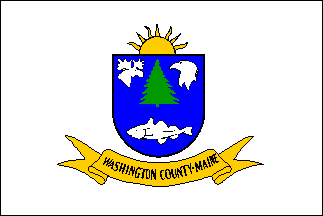
Flag of Washington County, Maine

Flag of York County, Maine

Green Mountain Boys flag

Flag of Vermont, featuring the New England pine tree

Flag of Maine, featuring the New England pine

=== Composition flags ===
Flag of Connecticut

Flag of Maine

Flag of Massachusetts

Flag of New Hampshire

Flag of Rhode Island

Flag of Rhode Island (fringed)

Flag of Vermont

Composition ensigns

Maine ensign

Ensign of Massachusetts

== See also ==
- Pine Tree Flag
- 1901 Maine Flag

== Works cited ==
- Barnes, Viola Florence (1923). The Dominion of New England: A Study in British Colonial Policy. F. Ungar Publishing Company. ISBN 978-0-8044-1065-6. OCLC 395292.
- Crouthers, David (1962). Flags of American History. Maplewood, New Jersey: Hammond and Company. ISBN 9780843730807.
- Hulme, F. Edward (1896). THE Flags of The World:THEIR HISTORY, BLAZONRY, AND ASSOCIATIONS. FROM THE BANNER OF THE CRUSADER TO THE BURGEE OF THE YACHTSMAN; FLAGS NATIONAL, COLONIAL, PERSONAL; THE ENSIGNS OF MIGHTY EMPIRES; THE SYMBOLS OF LOST CAUSES. London: Frederick Warne and Co. ISBN 9781176617360.
- Fischer, David Hackett (2004). Liberty and Freedom: A Visual History of America's Founding Ideas. Oxford and New York: Oxford University Press. ISBN 9780195162530.
- Furlong, William Rea; McCandless, Byron (1981). So Proudly We Hail : The History of the United States Flag. Washington, D.C.: Smithsonian Institution Press. ISBN 978-0-87474-448-4.
- Lossing, Benson J. (1850). Pictorial Field Book of the Revolution. New York.
- Mastai, Boleslaw; Mastai, Marie-Louise D'Otrange (1973). The Stars and the Stripes. The American Flag as Art and as History from the Birth of the Republic to the Present. New York: Alfred A. Knopf. ISBN 978-0-394-47217-1.
- Martucci, David (2005). Flag and Symbol Usage in Early New England (PDF). North American Vexillological Association. p. 33.
- McCandless, Byron; Grosvenor, Gilbert Hovery (1917). Flags of the World. Washington D.C.: The National Geographic Society.
