= Flag of Maine (1901–1909) =

Official flag of the U.S. state of Maine from 1901 to 1909

State of Maine
- Use: Civil and state flag
- Proportion: 2:3
- Adopted: March 21, 1901; 125 years ago
- Relinquished: Circa 1909
- Design: Green pine tree on a buff field with a blue star in the canton.

The flag of the U.S. state of Maine from 1901 to 1909 was the first official flag to be used to represent the state other than its militia; it was replaced by Maine’s current flag, featuring the state’s coat of arms, in 1909.

The flag has seen a revival of interest due to local Maine vexillologists advocating for its re-adoption and businesses selling reproductions of it. There has been a movement for Maine to readopt a version of this flag design since at least 1991, with an unsuccessful referendum on the issue having been held in November 2024.

== Design ==
Although the official pattern for "Embroidered or Painted Bunting" was published by the Legislature, the 1901 legislative document simply states “buff charged with the emblem of the State, a pine tree proper in the center and the polar star (a mullet of five points), in blue in the upper corner.” As long as this criterion is met, the flag should be considered a Maine state flag. Some flags today might have stylized pine trees or various shades of “buff” (beige). The pine tree is a traditional symbol of New England and has been featured on New England flags since at least 1686, notably the Pine Tree Flag.

A modern popular version of the flag uses a tree design from the Maine merchant and marine flag.

== History ==
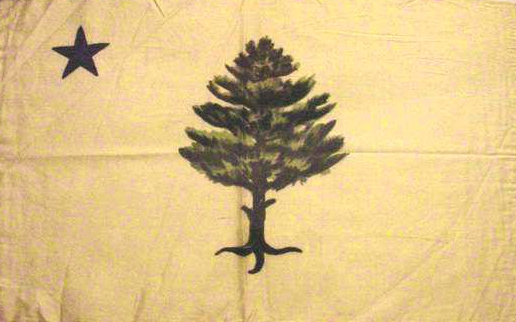
Photograph of a surviving period-correct flag in a private collection

Although Maine had a semi-official militia flag from the 1820s to at least the 1860s, an official design was first proposed at the time the State House was being enlarged.

=== Adoption ===
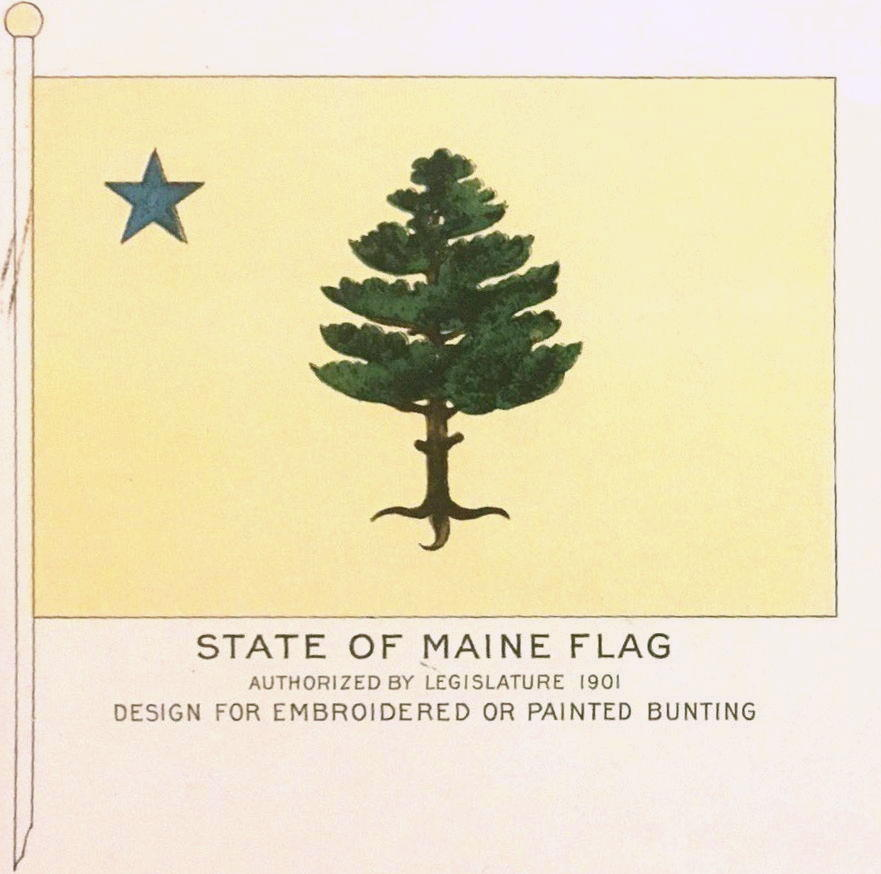
The flag as depicted by the Maine Legislature, April 15, 1901.

On March 6, 1901, An act to establish a State Flag was read in the State House of Representatives and referred to the Military Affairs Committee. It was read the next day in the State Senate and also referred to Military Affairs. The first draft of this act reads as follows:

The State Flag is hereby declared to be blue, charged with the Arms of the State in the colors and as described in the Resolves of the State of Maine from 1820 to 1828, Volume I, Chapter IV. Resolve for providing a Seal, June 9th, 1820, Description of the Device, &c., of the Seal and Arms of the State of Maine.

The Military Affairs Committee read their report on this act in the House on March 15 and in the Senate on March 19; this report contained a new draft and was read by Frederick Walls of Vinalhaven (born North Searsmont, Me., 1844; died Vinalhaven, March 15, 1921, son of Jacob Walls and Eliza Thompson) with the recommendation, ought to pass. The New Draft Reads As Follows

The State Flag is hereby declared to be buff charged with the emblem of the State, a pine tree proper in the center and the polar star (a mullet of five points), in blue in the upper corner. The star to be equidistant from the hoist and upper border of the flag, the distance from the two borders to the center of the star equal to about one quarter the hoist. This distance and the size of the star being proportionate to the size of the flag.

This act passed both houses and on March 21, 1901 was Engrossed – Chapter 233 – State Law.

The flag, a simple combination of a buff ground bearing a Pine Tree in the center and a blue star in the canton, was the creation of Adjutant General John T. Richards. In its 26 March 1901 edition, on page 5, The Kennebec Journal reported that “He did not word the description according to the terms used in heraldry because they might be blind to many who are not familiar with them, but the bill in simple comprehensive language set forth General Richards’ design.”

The paper went on to explain “The design as adopted is preferable in many aspects to the State coat-of-arms ... Maine is everywhere known as ‘The Pine Tree State’ and what could be more appropriate than ... the tree should be one of the features of the flag? ... Were a flag bearing the pine tree carried through any city the people would say ‘There is Maine’.”

=== Usage ===
The design was also used by the militia both as a military flag and as the design for the buttons of the new uniforms. The Maine Railroad Company, known as “The Pine Tree Line”, also used a variant on its conductors' uniform buttons. The design was also used by the people of Maine in various capacities, such as at the "Old Home Week" celebrations in 1901 and later and in various cities such as Boston and New York that had active Maine State Clubs. The State of Maine launch "Sea Gull" reportedly used it as a jack in 1904. Even as the Maine Legislature decided to change the flag in 1909, it was proudly displayed by the Hon. F.E. Timberlake at his Rangeley "camp", Marsquamosy Lodge.

Only one existing contemporary example of the 1901 flag is known to exist today. It is a small silk flag made about 1908 by the A. Kimball Co. of New York, likely for the Alaska Yukon Pacific Exposition, which was held in 1909. There are three known copies of this flag, one each in California, Maryland, and Maine.

=== Replacement ===
A new law was later enacted on February 23, 1909, modeled on the first draft and supposedly after flags used in the Civil War, which revised the original:

§206. State flag. The flag to be known as the official flag of the State shall be of blue, of the same color as the blue field in the flag of the United States, and of the following dimensions and designs; to wit, the length or height of the staff to be 9 feet, including brass spearhead and ferrule; the fly of said flag to be 5 feet 6 inches, and to be 4 feet 4 inches on the staff; in the center of the flag there shall be embroidered in silk on both sides of the flag the coat of arms of the State, in proportionate size; the edges to be trimmed with knotted fringe of yellow silk, 2 1/2 inches wide; a cord, with tassels, to be attached to the staff at the spearhead, to be 8 feet 6 inches long and composed of white and blue silk strands. A flag made in accordance with the description given in this section shall be kept in the office of the Adjutant General as a model.

The 1909 flag is described in minute detail, including specific size, embroidery in silk, pole, spearhead, fringe, cord and tassel; there are no flags known to exist that meet these legal descriptions. The supposed model flag in the Adjutant General's office is made of printed synthetic materials and is mounted on a pole shorter than nine feet and includes purple trees in the forest behind the white pine and moose.

To be clear, the suggestion that this flag was the same as flags used during the Civil War, an argument used to support the change, is not entirely true. Like all other Union States, Maine regiments used different flags 1861-1865. When the War started in 1861, existing Maine Militia units were mobilized and engaged using the 1822 pattern State Militia Colors. The report of Colonel J.B. Kershaw, commanding the 2nd South Carolina Infantry, dated 27 July 1861, reads:

"Among the trophies taken by my regiment was the flag of the First Regiment, Second Brigade, Fourth Division, of the State of Maine, with its proud motto, "Dirigo", and a small Federal ensign." (O.R., Series I, Vol. 2, p. 527).

The "Register of Captured Flags, 1861-65", compiled by the War Department during and immediately after the Civil War included a list of 263 Union recaptured flags that were found among the C.S. War Department archives, with dispositions provided for most. Of the Union recapture list, No. 219 of the register was described as such:

"No. 219 Regimental flag of the 1st Regiment Maine Infantry, 2nd Brigade, 4th Division. no history."

It was returned to Maine 31 March 1905 but its present whereabouts is unknown. This flag is certainly one of the 1822 pattern colors.

The flags that were issued by the State of Maine 1861-1863 mostly were blue with the State Arms either on both sides or on one side. As each was individually painted by different painters, there was considerable variation. The 5th Maine Volunteer Infantry Color, for example, bore the Maine Arms on the obverse and the U.S. Eagle on the reverse, a not uncommon design of the day.

By 1863, however, regiments were drawing their arms and equipment from the Federal Government rather than the State and those flags were blue with the U.S. Eagle on both sides. The famous flag of the 20th Maine Volunteer Infantry used at Gettysburg was of this design.

=== Resurgence ===
A modern version of the flag using the pine from the merchant and marine flag

In both 1991 and 1997, David B. Martucci of Washington, advocated for proposed legislation, brought forward by his representatives in the Maine Legislature, to revert to the 1901 flag, arguing that it was a simpler, more representative design of Maine as the "Pine Tree State" and was unlike any other current U.S. state flag. In both 1991 and 1997 the proposal failed, receiving 0 and 1 votes respectively.

Local Maine businesses have also begun advocating for the return of the 1901 Maine flag. In 2008, CRW Flags in Glen Burnie, Maryland, began offering an exact copy of the only known existing flag from the 1900s. In 2017, the Maine Flag Company began producing an appliqué version of the original Maine flag in their studio in Portland. In place of the original tree, Maine Flag Company used the simplified pine tree from Maine's official ensign. As this simplified flag began to gain more visibility, other manufacturers throughout the state and country began commercially producing the flag. Some of these and other firms sell clothing, hats, stickers, patches, beverage coolers, and other items bearing the flag or its elements. Due to these manufacturers, the 1901 Maine flag has gained a surge in popularity.

A legislative bill was submitted in 2019 to change the state's official flag to one more resembling the original. After an initial wave of support, the bill died in committee due to a larger outcry over changing the flag.

Version put to referendum in 2024.

On 3 February 2021, the State and Local Government Committee of the Maine Legislature considered LD 115, An Act To Restore the Former State of Maine Flag sponsored by Representative Sean Paulhus, and took testimony from 13 individuals, including Rep. Paulhus. All but one supported the bill; Secretary of State Shenna Bellows testified neither in favor nor in opposition to the bill. On 10 February 2021, the committee voted out a Divided Report. Subsequently, the Maine Legislature defeated the proposal.

On 6 June 2023, the Maine House of Representatives narrowly advanced a bill, proposing to change the state flag to the original 1901 version, by 66 to 64. This established a public vote, and a statewide contest was held to establish a specific design, with the winning entry created by Adam Lemire of Gardiner.

On 5 November 2024 the Maine State Flag Referendum, also known as Question 5, was rejected by state voters; if enacted, it would have changed the official state flag to Lemire's update of the 1901 flag. The campaign was marked by intense discussion of whether the readoption of the 1901 flag was motivated by ideological concerns (including contrasting allegations that the 1901 flag was similar to the "Appeal to Heaven" flag associated with Christian nationalism in the USA, and that opponents of the existing flag were seeking to "erase" white men from Maine's state identity), as well consideration of the potential cost of replacing official flags.

== See also ==
- Symbols of the State of Maine
