= 2024 United States Senate election in Maine =

- November 5, 2024
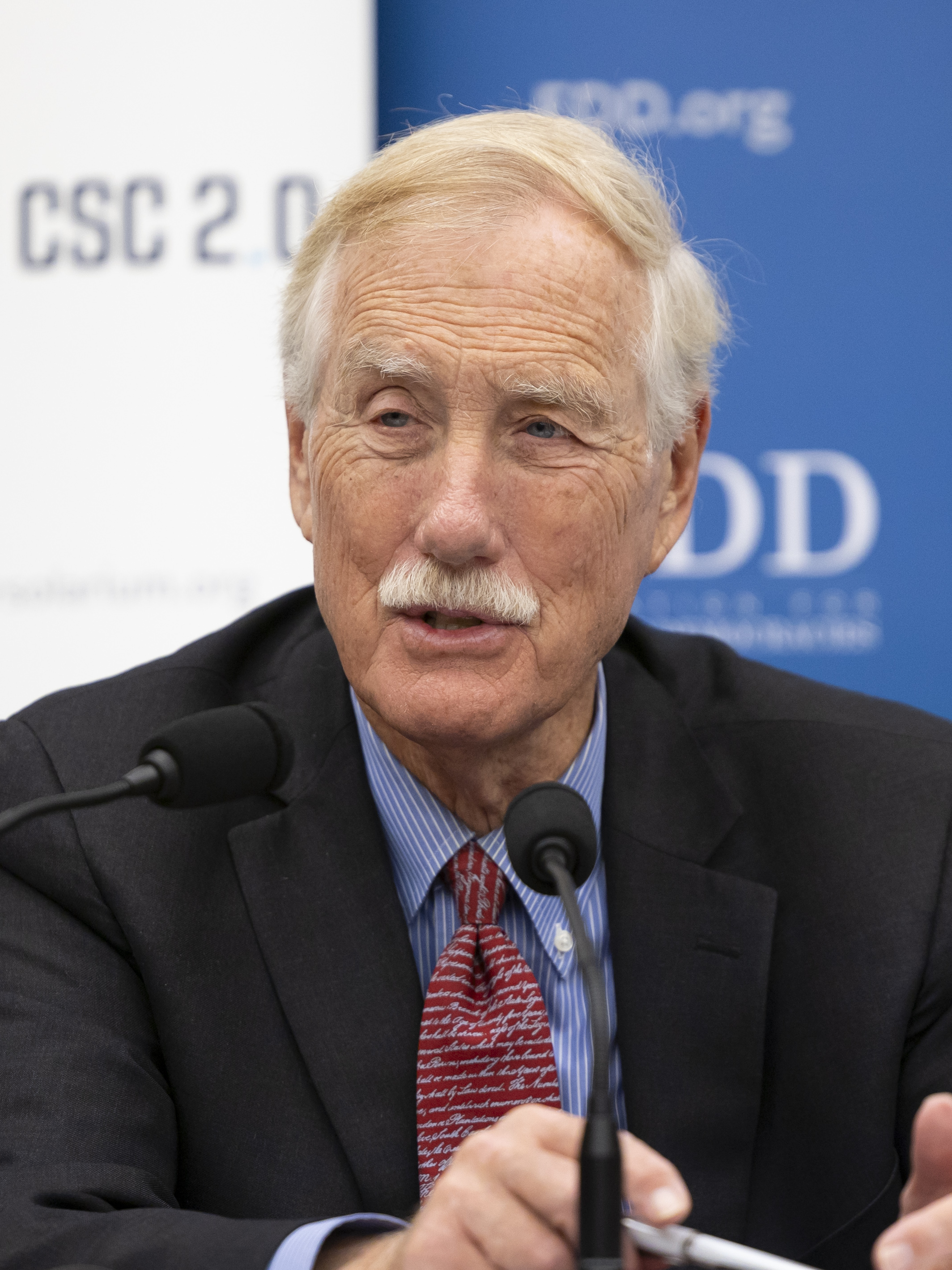

Candidate	Angus King	Demi Kouzounas	David Costello
Party	Independent	Republican	Democratic
Popular vote	427,331	284,338	88,891
Percentage	52.06%	34.64%	10.83%
- King: 30–40% 40–50% 50–60% 60–70% 70–80% >90% Kouzonunas: 40–50% 50–60% 60–70% 70–80% 80–90% >90% Costello: 80–90% Tie: 40–50% 50% No data
U.S Senator before election
Angus King
Independent
Elected U.S Senator
Angus King
Independent

The 2024 United States Senate election in Maine was held on November 5, 2024, to elect a member of the U.S. Senate to represent the state of Maine. Incumbent independent Senator Angus King won re-election to a third term, defeating Democratic nominee David Costello, Republican nominee Demitroula Kouzounas, and independent Jason Cherry. Primary elections took place on June 11, 2024.

This election coincided with five referendum questions, including a referendum to change the state flag, as well as the presidential election, U.S. House elections for the state's two congressional districts, and various other state, county and local elections.

King won re-election to a third term in office with 52.06% of the vote. He outperformed Kamala Harris in the concurrent presidential election, winning by a margin of 17.42 percentage points to Harris's margin of 6.94 percentage points. He won six counties that Harris lost.

== Independents ==
=== Candidates ===
==== Declared ====
- Jason Cherry, attorney and former FBI agent
- Angus King, incumbent U.S. senator

=== Endorsements ===
Angus King

U.S. senators

- Joe Manchin, West Virginia (2010–2025) (Independent; Democratic until 2024)

Labor unions

- AFL-CIO

Organizations

- AIPAC
- Feminist Majority PAC
- International Franchise Association
- Jewish Democratic Council of America
- J Street PAC
- League of Conservation Voters
- Planned Parenthood Action Fund
- Population Connection Action Fund

=== Fundraising ===
Campaign finance reports as of July 24, 2024
Candidate	Raised	Spent	Cash on hand
Angus King (I)	$4,802,784	$2,069,527	$3,118,927
Jason Cherry (I)	$110,000	$95,478	$6,011
Source: Federal Election Commission

== Republican primary ==
=== Candidates ===
==== Nominee ====
- Demitroula "Demi" Kouzounas, former chair of the Maine Republican Party

=== Endorsements ===
Demitroula "Demi" Kouzounas

Statewide officials

- Paul LePage, former governor of Maine (2011–2019)

=== Fundraising ===
Campaign finance reports as of May 22, 2024
Candidate	Raised	Spent	Cash on hand
Demi Kouzounas (R)	$300,712 (Note: $154,001 of this total was self-funded by Kouzounas)	$55,731	$244,980
Source: Federal Election Commission

=== Results ===
Republican primary results
Party	Candidate	Votes	%
Republican	Demi Kouzounas	58,832	100.0%
Total votes		58,832	100.0%

== Democratic primary ==
=== Candidates ===
==== Nominee ====
- David Costello, consultant and former deputy secretary of the Maryland Department of the Environment

==== Withdrawn ====
- Natasha Alcala, fashion designer

=== Fundraising ===
Campaign finance reports as of May 22, 2024
Candidate	Raised	Spent	Cash on hand
David Costello (D)	$72,408 (Note: $50,000 of this total was self-funded by Costello)	$13,302	$59,424
Source: Federal Election Commission

=== Results ===
Democratic primary results
Party	Candidate	Votes	%
Democratic	David Costello	54,537	100.0%
Total votes		54,537	100.0%

== General election ==
=== Predictions ===
Source	Ranking	As of
The Cook Political Report	Solid I	November 9, 2023
Inside Elections	Solid I	November 9, 2023
Sabato's Crystal Ball	Safe I	September 5, 2024
Decision Desk HQ/The Hill	Safe I	October 11, 2024
Elections Daily	Safe I	May 4, 2023
CNalysis	Solid I	November 21, 2023
RealClearPolitics	Solid I	August 5, 2024
Split Ticket	Safe I	October 23, 2024
538	Likely I	October 23, 2024

=== Fundraising ===
Campaign finance reports as of September 30, 2024
Candidate	Raised	Spent	Cash on hand
Angus King (I)	$4,802,784	$2,069,527	$3,118,927
Demi Kouzounas (R)	$503,998 (Note: $314,001 of this total was self-funded by Kouzounas)	$170,805	$333,192
David Costello (D)	$109,637 (Note: $77,000 of this total was self-funded by Costello)	$24,063	$85,894
Jason Cherry (I)	$110,000 (Note: $55,000 of this total was self-funded by Cherry)	$95,478	$6,011
Source: Federal Election Commission

=== Polling ===
Poll source	Date(s) administered	Sample size (Note: Key: A – all adults RV – registered voters LV – likely voters V – unclear)	Margin of error	Angus King (I)	Demi Kouzounas (R)	David Costello (D)	Other	Undecided
University of New Hampshire	October 29 – November 2, 2024	1,485 (LV)	± 2.4%	50%	35%	7%	1% (Note: Cherry (I) with 1%)	6%
SurveyUSA (Note: Poll sponsored by Bangor Daily News and FairVote)	October 24–29, 2024	1,079 (LV)	± 3.6%	54%	28%	8%	3% (Note: Cherry (I) with 3%)	8%
Pan Atlantic Research	September 5–15, 2024	812 (LV)	± 3.5%	53%	23%	8%	1% (Note: Cherry (I) with 1%)	16%
University of New Hampshire	August 15–19, 2024	951 (LV)	± 3.2%	43%	33%	9%	4% (Note: Cherry (I) with 3%; "Another candidate" with 1%)	12%
Digital Research	April 8–30, 2024	609 (RV)	± 4.0%	57%	28%	12%	–	3%

=== Results ===

2024 United States Senate election in Maine
Party	Candidate	Votes	%	±%
Independent	Angus King (incumbent)	427,331	52.06%	−2.25
Republican	Demi Kouzounas	284,338	34.64%	−0.59
Democratic	David Costello	88,891	10.83%	+0.38
Independent	Jason Cherry	20,222	2.46%	N/A
Total votes		820,782	100.00%	N/A
Independent hold				

==== By county ====
By county

County	Angus King Independent		Demi Kouzounas Republican		David Costello Democratic		All Others		Margin		Total votes
County	#	%	#	%	#	%	#	%	#	%	Total votes
Androscoggin	29,332	50.4%	22,073	37.9%	5,354	9.2%	1,455	2.5%	7,259	12.5%	58,214
Aroostook	16,727	47.7%	14,996	42.8%	2,492	7.1%	820	2.3%	1,731	4.9%	35,035
Cumberland	113,847	59.6%	47,372	24.8%	26,249	13.7%	2,634	1.9%	66,475	34.8%	191,102
Franklin	9,067	51.4%	6,731	38.2%	1,371	7.8%	471	2.7%	2,336	12.2%	17,640
Hancock	19,666	54.8%	11,585	32.3%	3,753	10.4%	912	2.5%	8,081	22.5%	35,916
Kennebec	36,394	50.7%	27,170	37.9%	6,124	8.5%	2,033	2.8%	9,224	12.8%	71,721
Knox	14,526	56.6%	7,873	30.7%	2,695	10.5%	586	2.3%	6,653	25.9%	25,680
Lincoln	12,739	54.9%	7,613	32.8%	2,275	9.8%	558	2.4%	5,126	22.1%	23,185
Oxford	16,837	49.3%	13,779	40.3%	2,595	7.6%	949	2.8%	3,058	9.0%	34,160
Penobscot	39,123	45.5%	35,774	41.6%	8,659	10.1%	2,446	2.8%	3,349	3.9%	86,002
Piscataquis	4,291	42.5%	4,943	48.9%	595	5.9%	275	2.7%	-652	-7.4%	10,104
Sagadahoc	14,328	58.9%	7,373	30.3%	2,167	8.9%	439	1.8%	6,955	28.6%	24,307
Somerset	11,984	43.6%	12,713	46.2%	1,735	6.3%	1,058	3.8%	-729	-2.6%	27,490
Waldo	12,440	50.1%	8,821	35.5%	2,509	10.1%	1,078	4.3%	3,619	14.6%	24,848
Washington	7,398	41.6%	8,522	47.9%	1,400	7.9%	455	2.6%	-1,124	-6.3%	17,775
York	65,552	50.0%	46,204	35.2%	16,507	12.6%	2,906	2.2%	19,348	14.8%	131,169
Totals	427,331	52.1%	284,338	34.6%	88,891	10.8%	20,222	2.5%	142,993	17.5%	820,782

Counties that flipped from Independent to Republican

- Washington (largest city: Calais)

=== By congressional district ===
King won both congressional districts, which both elected Democrats.

District	King	Kouzounas	Costello	Representative
1st	55%	30%	12%	Chellie Pingree
2nd	49%	40%	9%	Jared Golden

== Notes ==
Partisan clients
