= 2024 United States presidential election in Maine =

- November 5, 2024
- Turnout: 74.2% (▼3.8 pp)

Nominee	Kamala Harris	Donald Trump
Party	Democratic	Republican
Home state	California	Florida
Running mate	Tim Walz	JD Vance
Electoral vote	3	1
Popular vote	435,652	377,977
Percentage	52.40%	45.46%

Harris
40–50%
50–60%
60–70%
70–80%
80–90%
90–100%
Trump
40–50%
50–60%
60–70%
70–80%
80–90%
90–100%
Tie/No data
50%
President before election
Joe Biden
Democratic
Elected President
Donald Trump
Republican

The 2024 United States presidential election in Maine took place on Tuesday, November 5, 2024, as part of the 2024 United States presidential election in which all 50 states plus the District of Columbia participated. Maine voters chose electors to represent them in the Electoral College via a popular vote. The state of Maine has four electoral votes in the Electoral College, following reapportionment due to the 2020 United States census in which the state neither gained nor lost a seat. This election coincided with five referendum questions including a referendum to change the state flag, as well as a U.S. Senate election, U.S. House elections for the state's two congressional districts and various other state, county and local elections. The state uses ranked-choice voting.

Most polls and analysts accurately predicted Maine to remain in the Democratic camp at large in the 2024 election. Harris won Maine at-large by about 6.9%, worse than Biden but better than Clinton, and with the largest raw vote total of any presidential candidate in the state's history. As expected, Harris won Maine's 1st congressional district while Trump won Maine's 2nd congressional district, both with majorities of the vote.

== Primary elections ==
=== Democratic primary ===
The Maine Democratic primary was held on Super Tuesday, March 5, 2024.

2024 Maine Democratic pres. primary
Candidate	Votes	%	Delegates
Joe Biden (incumbent)	60,018	82.81	24
Dean Phillips	4,623	6.38	0
Other candidates (write-in) (Note: The names of write-in votes were only published as "Others".)	480	0.66	—
Blank ballots	7,359	10.15	—
Total	72,480	100%	24

=== Republican primary ===
The Maine Republican caucuses was held on Super Tuesday, March 5, 2024.

Maine Republican primary, March 5, 2024
Candidate	Votes	Percentage	Actual delegate count		
Candidate	Votes	Percentage	Bound	Unbound	Total
Donald Trump	79,034	71.92%	20	0	20
Nikki Haley	27,912	25.40%	0	0	0
Ron DeSantis (withdrawn)	1,191	1.08%	0	0	0
Vivek Ramaswamy (withdrawn)	440	0.40%	0	0	0
Ryan Binkley (withdrawn)	299	0.27%	0	0	0
Blank ballots	1,022	0.93%	0	0	0
Total:	109,898	100.00%	20	0	20

==== Attempted disqualification of Trump ====
Following a challenge to Trump's nomination petition for the Republican primary, the Maine Secretary of State Shenna Bellows on December 28, 2023 rejected Donald Trump's petition for the ballot on grounds of insurrection, similarly to what the Colorado Supreme Court ordered the secretary of state to do in Anderson v. Griswold for the Colorado primary. On January 2, 2024, Trump appealed the ruling to the Maine Superior Court, arguing that Bellows is biased and that she has "no legal authority to consider the federal constitutional issues presented by the challengers". On January 17, a Maine Superior Court judge ordered Bellows to wait for the Colorado case to be adjudicated by the Supreme Court before upholding or modifying her decision. Bellows appealed this decision to the Maine Supreme Judicial Court, and the appeal was dismissed on January 24. On March 4, 2024, the US Supreme Court ruled in Trump v. Anderson that the Colorado courts could not order for Trump to be removed from the Republican primary ballot as it is a matter for Congress to legislate on, which it had not. The secretary of state reversed her decision on the same day as the US Supreme Court's ruling.

== General election ==
=== Predictions ===
Source	1st district	2nd district	Statewide	As of
The Economist	Safe D	Likely R	Likely D	September 5, 2024
Cook Political Report	Safe D	Likely R	Likely D	August 27, 2024
Decision Desk HQ/The Hill	Safe D	Likely R	Safe D	November 4, 2024
CNalysis	Safe D	Very Likely R	Solid D	November 4, 2024
538	Safe D	Likely R	Likely D	July 15, 2024
CNN	Safe D	Lean R	Safe D	January 14, 2024
Sabato's Crystal Ball	Safe D	Likely R	Likely D	June 29, 2023
Inside Elections	Safe D	Lean R	Likely D	April 26, 2023
NBC News	Safe D	Likely R	Likely D	October 6, 2024
YouGov	Safe D	Tossup	Safe D	November 1, 2024
Split Ticket	Safe D	Likely R	Likely D	November 1, 2024

=== Polling ===
==== Statewide ====
Kamala Harris vs. Donald Trump

Poll source	Date(s) administered	Sample size (Note: Key: A – all adults RV – registered voters LV – likely voters V – unclear)	Margin of error	Kamala Harris Democratic	Donald Trump Republican	Other / Undecided
University of New Hampshire	August 15–19, 2024	951 (LV)	± 3.2%	58%	41%	1%
University of New Hampshire	July 23–25, 2024	1,445 (LV)	± 2.6%	54%	45%	1%

Kamala Harris vs. Donald Trump vs. Cornel West vs. Jill Stein vs. Chase Oliver

Poll source	Date(s) administered	Sample size	Margin of error	Kamala Harris Democratic	Donald Trump Republican	Cornel West Independent	Jill Stein Green	Chase Oliver Libertarian	Other / Undecided
University of New Hampshire	October 29 – November 2, 2024	1,485 (LV)	± 2.4%	52%	41%	1%	1%	1%	4% (Note: "Another Candidate" with 1%)
SurveyUSA (Note: Poll sponsored by Bangor Daily News & FairVote)	October 24–29, 2024	1,079 (LV)	± 3.6%	51%	43%	1%	1%	1%	3%
Pan Atlantic Research	September 5–15, 2024	812 (LV)	± 3.5%	50%	41%	1%	1%	1%	6%

Hypothetical polling with Robert F. Kennedy Jr.

Kamala Harris vs. Donald Trump vs. Robert F. Kennedy Jr. vs. Cornel West vs. Jill Stein vs. Chase Oliver

Poll source	Date(s) administered	Sample size	Margin of error	Kamala Harris Democratic	Donald Trump Republican	Robert Kennedy Jr Independent	Cornel West Independent	Jill Stein Green	Chase Oliver Libertarian	Other / Undecided
University of New Hampshire	August 15–19, 2024	951 (LV)	± 3.2%	55%	38%	2%	0%	1%	1%	3%
University of New Hampshire	July 23–25, 2024	1,445 (LV)	± 2.6%	48%	40%	4%	1%	1%	1%	5%

Hypothetical polling with Joe Biden and Donald Trump

Joe Biden vs. Donald Trump

Poll source	Date(s) administered	Sample size	Margin of error	Joe Biden Democratic	Donald Trump Republican	Other / Undecided
John Zogby Strategies (Note: Poll conducted for Kennedy's campaign)	April 13–21, 2024	350 (LV)	–	45%	46%	9%
Pan Atlantic Research	February 6–14, 2024	791 (LV)	± 3.5%	32%	38%	30% (Note: "Another Candidate" with 21%)
Digital Research	October 3 – November 2, 2023	614 (RV)	± 3.9%	36%	35%	29% (Note: "Some other candidate" with 10%)
Emerson College	September 19–20, 2022	1,164 (LV)	± 2.8%	51%	40%	9%

Joe Biden vs. Donald Trump vs. Robert F. Kennedy Jr. vs. Cornel West vs. Jill Stein

Poll source	Date(s) administered	Sample size	Margin of error	RCV count	Joe Biden Democratic	Donald Trump Republican	Robert Kennedy Jr Independent	Cornel West Independent	Jill Stein Green	Other / Undecided
Digital Research	April 8–30, 2024	609 (RV)	± 4.0%	1	40%	41%	10%	1%	6%	2%
Digital Research	April 8–30, 2024	609 (RV)	± 4.0%	2	41%	41%	11%	1%	6%	Elim
Digital Research	April 8–30, 2024	609 (RV)	± 4.0%	3	41%	42%	11%	Elim	6%	Elim
Digital Research	April 8–30, 2024	609 (RV)	± 4.0%	4	42%	43%	15%	Elim	Elim	Elim
Digital Research	April 8–30, 2024	609 (RV)	± 4.0%	5	51%	49%	Elim	Elim	Elim	Elim

Hypothetical polling with other candidates

Joe Biden vs. Robert F. Kennedy Jr.

Poll source	Date(s) administered	Sample size	Margin of error	Joe Biden Democratic	Robert F. Kennedy Jr. Independent	Other / Undecided
John Zogby Strategies	April 13–21, 2024	350 (LV)	–	35%	53%	12%

Robert F. Kennedy Jr. vs. Donald Trump

Poll source	Date(s) administered	Sample size	Margin of error	Robert F. Kennedy Jr. Independent	Donald Trump Republican	Other / Undecided
John Zogby Strategies	April 13–21, 2024	350 (LV)	–	43%	37%	20%

==== Maine's 1st congressional district ====
Kamala Harris vs. Donald Trump

Poll source	Date(s) administered	Sample size	Margin of error	Kamala Harris Democratic	Donald Trump Republican	Other / Undecided
Pan Atlantic Research	September 5–15, 2024	414 (LV)	–	58%	32%	10%
University of New Hampshire	August 15–19, 2024	476 (LV)	–	64%	36%	–

Kamala Harris vs. Donald Trump vs. Cornel West vs. Jill Stein vs. Chase Oliver

Poll source	Date(s) administered	Sample size	Margin of error	Kamala Harris Democratic	Donald Trump Republican	Cornel West Independent	Jill Stein Green	Chase Oliver Libertarian	Other / Undecided
University of New Hampshire	October 29 – November 2, 2024	801 (LV)	± 3.5%	60%	36%	0%	1%	1%	2%
SurveyUSA	October 24–29, 2024	482 (LV)	–	58%	37%	1%	1%	0%	3%

Hypothetical polling with Robert F. Kennedy Jr.

Kamala Harris vs. Donald Trump vs. Robert F. Kennedy Jr. vs. Cornel West vs. Jill Stein vs. Chase Oliver

Poll source	Date(s) administered	Sample size	Margin of error	Kamala Harris Democratic	Donald Trump Republican	Robert Kennedy Jr Independent	Cornel West Independent	Jill Stein Green	Chase Oliver Libertarian	Other / Undecided
University of New Hampshire	August 15–19, 2024	476 (LV)	–	62%	33%	2%	0%	0%	1%	2%

Hypothetical polling with Joe Biden and Donald Trump

Joe Biden vs. Donald Trump

Poll source	Date(s) administered	Sample size	Margin of error	Joe Biden Democratic	Donald Trump Republican	Other / Undecided
Pan Atlantic Research	February 6–14, 2024	791 (LV)	± 3.5%	39%	31%	31% (Note: "Another Candidate" with 23%)
Digital Research	October 3 – November 2, 2023	307 (RV)	–	43%	27%	30%

==== Maine's 2nd congressional district ====
Donald Trump vs. Kamala Harris

Poll source	Date(s) administered	Sample size	Margin of error	Donald Trump Republican	Kamala Harris Democratic	Other / Undecided
Axis Research (Note: Poll sponsored by the NRCC)	October 17–20, 2024	411 (LV)	± 4.8%	50%	41%	8% (Note: "Third-party candidate" with 3%)
Pan Atlantic Research	September 5–15, 2024	398 (LV)	–	49%	42%	9%
University of New Hampshire	August 15–19, 2024	432 (LV)	–	47%	52%	1%

Donald Trump vs. Kamala Harris vs. Cornel West vs. Jill Stein vs. Chase Oliver

Poll source	Date(s) administered	Sample size	Margin of error	Donald Trump Republican	Kamala Harris Democratic	Cornel West Independent	Jill Stein Green	Chase Oliver Libertarian	Other / Undecided
University of New Hampshire	October 29 – November 2, 2024	683 (LV)	± 3.7%	48%	44%	1%	1%	1%	5%
SurveyUSA	October 24–29, 2024	484 (LV)	–	49%	44%	1%	1%	1%	4%

Hypothetical polling with Robert F. Kennedy Jr.

Donald Trump vs. Kamala Harris vs. Robert F. Kennedy Jr. vs. Cornel West vs. Jill Stein vs. Chase Oliver

Poll source	Date(s) administered	Sample size	Margin of error	Donald Trump Republican	Kamala Harris Democratic	Robert Kennedy Jr Independent	Cornel West Independent	Jill Stein Green	Chase Oliver Libertarian	Other / Undecided
University of New Hampshire	August 15–19, 2024	432 (LV)	–	44%	49%	2%	0%	1%	1%	3%

Hypothetical polling with Joe Biden and Donald Trump

Donald Trump vs. Joe Biden

Poll source	Date(s) administered	Sample size	Margin of error	Donald Trump Republican	Joe Biden Democratic	Other / Undecided
Pan Atlantic Research	February 6–14, 2024	791 (LV)	± 3.5%	45%	25%	30% (Note: "Another Candidate" with 19%)
Digital Research	October 3 – November 2, 2023	307 (RV)	–	42%	28%	30%

=== Results ===
State House district results: Trump 40–50% 50–60% 60–70% 70–80% / Harris 40–50% 50–60% 60–70% 70–80% 80–90%

2024 United States presidential election in Maine
Party	Candidate	Votes	%	±%
Democratic	Kamala Harris; Tim Walz	435,652	52.40%	−0.69%
Republican	Donald Trump; JD Vance	377,977	45.46%	+1.44%
Green	Jill Stein; Butch Ware	8,967	1.08%	+0.08%
Libertarian	Chase Oliver; Mike ter Maat	5,286	0.64%	−1.09%
Justice For All	Cornel West; Melina Abdullah	2,912	0.35%	N/A
Write-in		581	0.07%	+0.06%
Total votes		831,375	100.00%	N/A

==== By county ====
County	Kamala Harris Democratic		Donald Trump Republican		Various candidates Other parties		Margin		Total
County	#	%	#	%	#	%	#	%	Total
Androscoggin	27,019	45.91%	30,605	52.01%	1,223	2.08%	-3,586	-6.10%	58,847
Aroostook	12,900	36.18%	22,246	62.40%	507	1.42%	-9,346	-26.22%	35,653
Cumberland	127,971	66.42%	59,964	31.12%	4,721	2.46%	68,007	35.30%	192,656
Franklin	7,990	44.80%	9,459	53.03%	387	2.17%	-1,469	-8.23%	17,836
Hancock	19,817	54.66%	15,551	42.90%	885	2.44%	4,266	11.76%	36,253
Kennebec	34,585	47.45%	36,589	50.20%	1,712	2.35%	-2,004	-2.75%	72,886
Knox	15,076	58.22%	10,262	39.63%	555	2.15%	4,814	18.59%	25,893
Lincoln	13,110	54.62%	10,409	43.37%	484	2.01%	2,701	11.25%	24,003
Oxford	14,765	42.69%	19,228	55.59%	597	1.72%	-4,463	-12.90%	34,590
Penobscot	37,945	43.58%	47,438	54.48%	1,690	1.94%	-9,493	-10.90%	87,073
Piscataquis	3,510	34.39%	6,487	63.57%	208	2.04%	-2,977	-29.18%	10,205
Sagadahoc	13,982	57.17%	9,917	40.55%	557	2.28%	4,065	16.62%	24,456
Somerset	10,134	35.63%	17,826	62.68%	481	1.69%	-7,692	-27.05%	28,441
Waldo	12,661	50.38%	11,815	47.02%	654	2.60%	846	3.36%	25,130
Washington	6,763	37.48%	11,001	60.96%	282	1.56%	-4,238	-23.48%	18,046
York	71,813	54.22%	58,054	43.83%	2,585	1.95%	13,759	10.39%	132,452
Total	430,342	52.17%	376,991	45.71%	17,473	2.12%	53,351	6.47%	824,806

Counties that flipped from Democratic to Republican

- Kennebec (largest municipality: Augusta)

==== By congressional district ====
Harris won the first of Maine's two congressional districts. Trump won the other district, which elected a Democrat to the House of Representatives in the same election cycle.

District	Harris		Trump		Other		Representative
District	#	%	#	%	#	%	Representative
1st	258,863	59.69%	165,214	38.09%	9,632	2.22%	Chellie Pingree
2nd	176,789	44.46%	212,763	53.50%	8,114	2.04%	Jared Golden

== Analysis ==
A sparsely populated state in New England, Maine is one of the most rural states in the nation and is considered to be moderately blue. Unlike all other states except Nebraska, Maine awards two electoral votes based on the statewide vote, and one vote for each congressional district. The at-large votes were expected to be contested by both parties, but are favored to be carried by the Democratic presidential candidate, having last been won by a Republican in 1988. However, the two congressional districts were expected to be split between the Democratic and Republican candidates with ME-1 being a strongly blue district and ME-2 being a moderately to strongly red district, something that had occurred in both 2016 and 2020.

Maine at large was potentially considered a secondary battleground during the 2024 election cycle. In 2016, Trump narrowly lost Maine at-large to Hillary Clinton by less than 3% and a margin of 22,142 votes. In 2020, Biden won the state by just over 9% and 74,302 votes, though Trump held Maine's 2nd congressional district. However, most polls and analysts accurately predicted Maine to remain in the Democratic camp at large in the 2024 election.

Harris won Maine at-large by about 6.9%, worse than Biden but better than Clinton, and with the largest raw vote total of any presidential candidate in the state's history. Maine was the only state where Harris received the most raw votes out of any candidate in the state's history. Maine was one of only six states where Harris received more raw votes than Biden in 2020, (Note: The other five states were Georgia, Nevada, North Carolina, Utah, and Wisconsin.) and the only one of these six that she won. Maine also had one of the smallest swings, swinging rightward by just 2%.

As expected, Harris won Maine's 1st congressional district while Trump won Maine's 2nd congressional district. Ranked-choice tabulation was ultimately not used as Harris won a majority of the vote statewide and in the 1st district, while Trump won a majority of the vote in the 2nd district. Despite losing the state, Trump received the highest percentage of the total vote for a Republican since George H. W. Bush carried the state in 1988.

All but two counties swung Republican compared to 2020, and Trump flipped Kennebec County, which he had won in 2016 but narrowly lost in 2020. However, the state trended (relative to the national popular vote) 3.9 points towards the Democrats, remaining non-competitively blue even as neighboring New Hampshire was decided rather narrowly. While every state in the union shifted toward Donald Trump in the 2024 election, Maine had one of the smallest such shifts. Trump was the first Republican since Bush to win Kennebec with a majority, winning it in 2016 on a plurality. It was also the first time since 2012 that the county was won by a majority, as Obama carried it with 55%.

== See also ==
- United States presidential elections in Maine
- 2024 United States presidential election
- 2024 Democratic Party presidential primaries
- 2024 Republican Party presidential primaries
- 2024 United States elections
