= Pine Tree Flag =

American Revolutionary-era flag

- Use: Other
- Proportion: 2:3
- Adopted: Used on American vessels by October 20, 1775; formally adopted by the Massachusetts Council on April 29, 1776
- Design: A white field charged with a green pine tree, and the words "AN APPEAL TO HEAVEN" in capital letters above the tree.
- Designed by: Joseph Reed

The Pine Tree Flag (or the An Appeal to Heaven Flag) was one of the flags used during the American Revolution. The flag, which featured a pine tree with the motto "An Appeal to Heaven", or less frequently "An Appeal to God", was used by a squadron of six schooners commissioned under George Washington's authority as commander-in-chief of the Continental Army beginning in October 1775.

The pine tree is a traditional symbol of New England. The phrase "appeal to heaven" appears in John Locke's Second Treatise on Government, where it is used to describe the right of revolution.

It is also used by libertarian activists and enthusiasts of the American Revolution to commemorate the Pine Tree Riot, one of the first acts of resistance by the American colonists to the Crown's authority eventually culminating in the American Revolution.

== Background ==
The flag of New England

Colonists adopted the pine as a symbol on flags and currency in the 17th century, including variants of the flag of New England and coinage produced by the Massachusetts Bay Colony from 1652 to 1682. The term "pine tree" also referred to oaks, willows, and other trees.

=== Appeal to Heaven ===
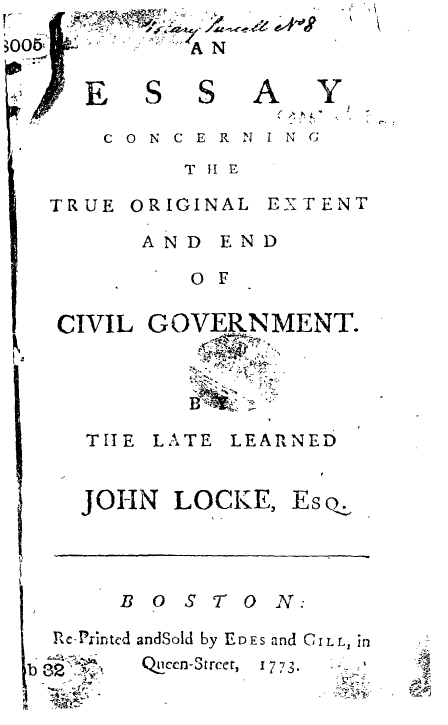
The only edition of John Locke's Treatises published in America during the 18th century (1773)

The phrase "Appeal to Heaven" is a particular expression of the right of revolution used by English philosopher John Locke in his Second Treatise on Government. The work was published in 1690 and rejected the theory of the divine right of kings. In chapter 14:

And where the body of the people, or any single man, is deprived of their right, or is under the exercise of a power without right, and have no appeal on earth, then they have a liberty to appeal to heaven, whenever they judge the cause of sufficient moment. And therefore, though the people cannot be judge, so as to have, by the constitution of that society, any superior power, to determine and give effective sentence in the case; yet they have, by a law antecedent and paramount to all positive laws of men, reserved that ultimate determination to themselves which belongs to all mankind, where there lies no appeal on earth, viz. to judge, whether they have just cause to make their appeal to heaven.

Locke's enlightenment-age works on the topic of the philosophy of government were well-known and frequently quoted by colonial leaders in the 1760–1776 period prior to American independence. Locke's writing that most influenced the American philosophy of government was his Two Treatises of Government, and has been used to defend the secularization of American political structures. Richard Henry Lee, a signer of the Declaration of Independence, saw the Declaration as being copied from that work. Locke was not only one of the most-cited political philosophers during the Founding Era (~1776 to 1779), but also the single most frequently-cited source in the years from 1760 to 1776 (the period leading up to the Declaration of Independence).

== Design and adoption ==
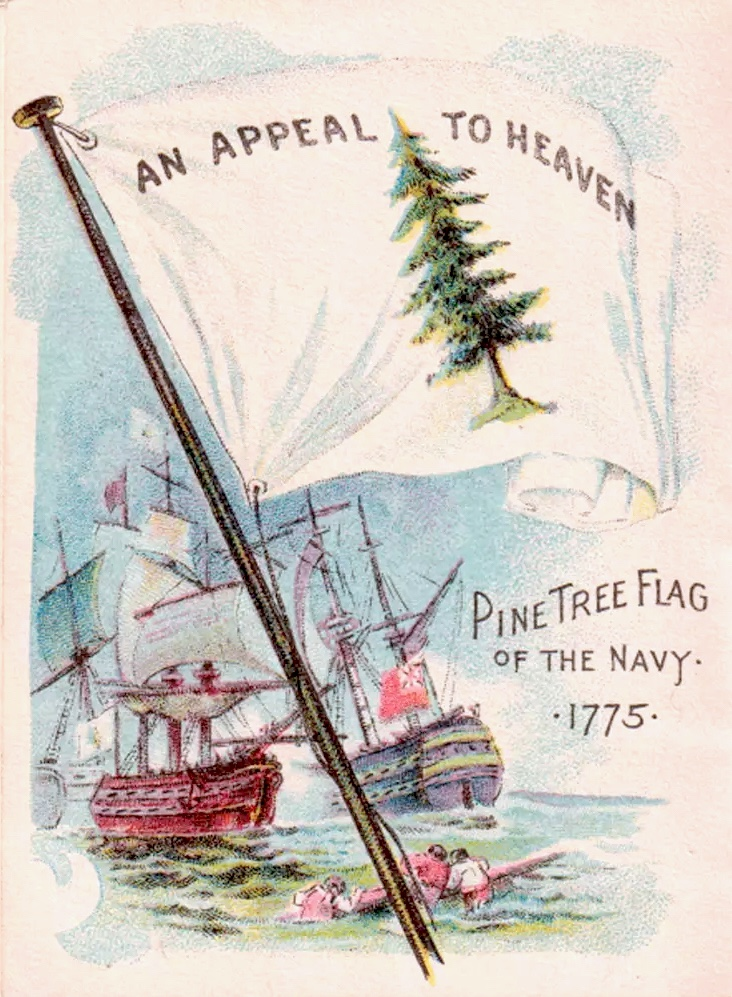
Illustration of the flag, Chase & Sanborn Coffee Company American history booklet, 1898

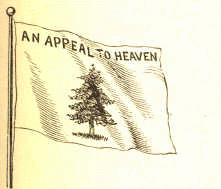
Illustration of the flag from 1894

A flag with a pine tree on it, "a red flag with the cross of St. George in the canton with a green pine tree in the first quarter", was used in New England as early as 1704, and may have flown at Bunker Hill in 1775. It also appeared having a "white field with the motto 'An Appeal to Heaven' above the pine tree".

In a letter dated October 20, 1775, General Washington's secretary, Colonel Joseph Reed, suggested a "flag with a white ground and a tree in the middle, the motto AN APPEAL TO HEAVEN" be used for the ships Washington commissioned. Two heavily armed American scows, or "floating batteries," launched on the Charles River in September 1775 had used the Pine Tree flag as an ensign; in his letter, Reed described the banner he proposed as "the flag of our floating batteries." The six schooners commissioned by Congress beginning in October 1775 to intercept British ships entering Boston—the USS Hancock, Lee, Franklin, Harrison, Lynch, and Warren—used the Pine Tree flag. Prior to Colonel Reed's suggestion, "an appeal to Heaven" or similar expressions had been invoked by the Massachusetts Provincial Congress in several resolutions, Patrick Henry in his Liberty or Death speech. Subsequently, the phrase was used again by the Second Continental Congress in the Declaration of Independence.

The following year, on April 29, 1776, the Massachusetts Council established the flag of the state navy with a resolution stating: "...that the Colours be a white Flag, with a green Pine Tree, and the Inscription, 'An Appeal to Heaven'."

The pine tree flag has been described as one of the most important flags in the colonies during 1775–1776, and the central image of the pine tree stood for wealth and power, in part because the tall trees were so important to the Royal Navy, as masts for warships.

The flag was a popular regional New England flag and was used to muster troops during the American Revolution before Congress adopted the Stars and Stripes. The flag may have served as partial inspiration for liberty trees and liberty poles.

A pine tree flag appeared on a handkerchief (sometimes referred to as a bandana) depicting George Washington on horseback, surrounded by various flags, dating to 1776–1777 and attributed to John Hewson. Jonathan Trumbull shows a variant of the flag in his c. 1785 painting of events at the Battle of Bunker Hill, The Death of General Warren at the Battle of Bunker's Hill, June 17, 1775.

== Use on other flags ==
=== Massachusetts ===
The Pine Tree Flag is the official maritime ensign for the Commonwealth of Massachusetts, though the inscription "An Appeal to Heaven" was removed from the flag in 1971. It was used by state navy vessels in addition to privateers sailing from Massachusetts.

On March 18, 1908, Massachusetts adopted their state flag, and on the reverse side of the flag could be seen a pine tree on a blue shield. In 1971, the reverse side of the flag was removed.

Current naval ensign of Massachusetts

Reverse side of the Massachusetts flag (1908–1971)

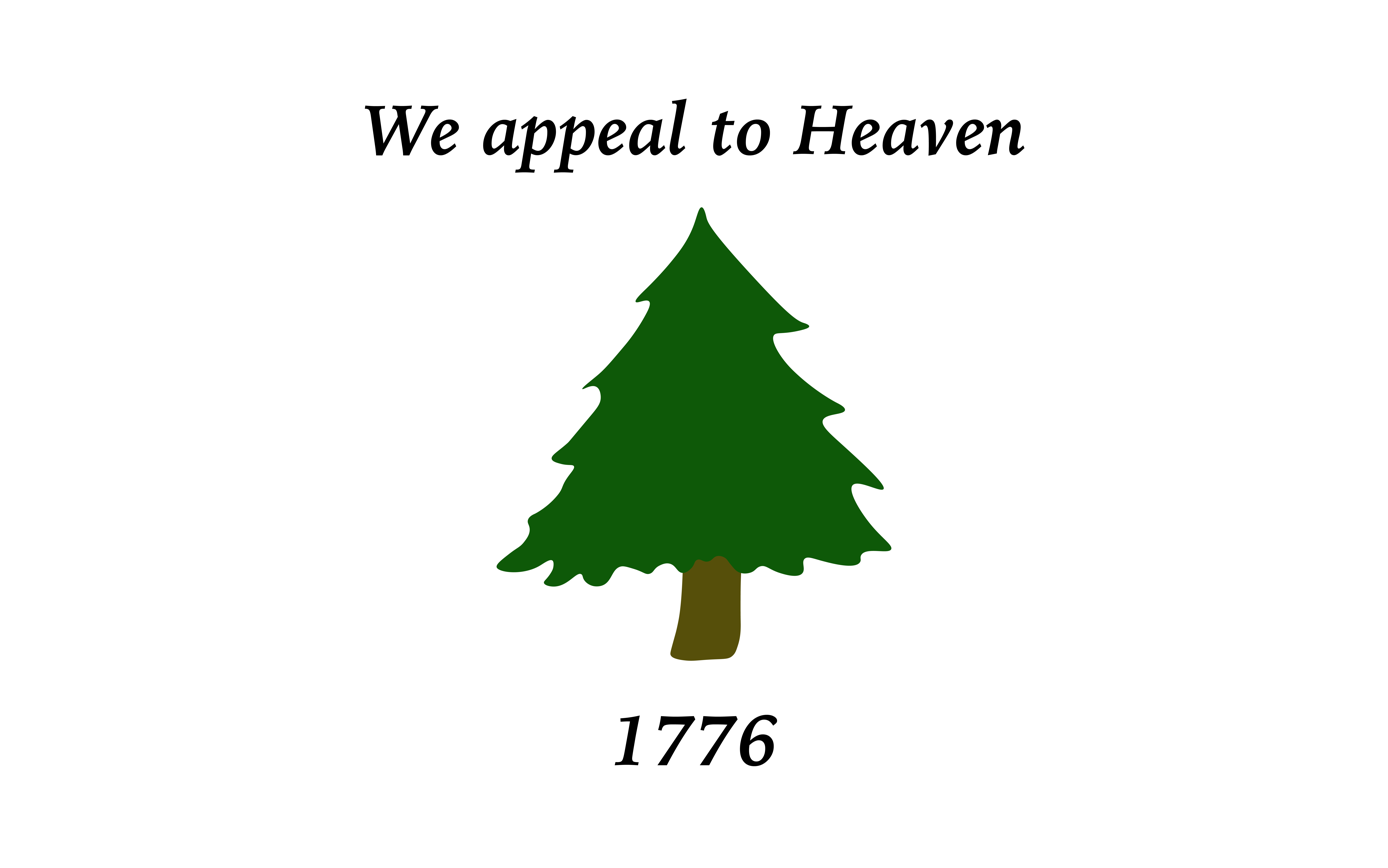
Pine Tree Flag flown in Salem, Massachusetts (1826)

=== Maine ===
Maine, nicknamed the "pine tree state", used a state flag from 1901–1909 that had a pine tree on a buff field with a blue star in the canton.

Maine currently has a naval ensign that features a pine tree on a white field.

The Maine National Guard also cites the Appeal to Heaven flag as a historic military symbol of Maine, stating that it was presented in July 1775 to the 31st Massachusetts Regiment of Foot, whose soldiers were recruited from present-day Maine. The regiment marched to Boston following the Battles of Lexington and Concord, and served in the Siege of Boston.

In 2024, a referendum question was placed on general election ballots in Maine, with 2024 Maine Question 5 asking voters: Do you favor making the former state flag, replaced as the official flag of the State in 1909 and commonly known as the Pine Tree Flag, the official flag of the State? The measure failed with 55% of votes in opposition.

The current flag of Maine still uses a pine tree in its design.

Former flag of Maine (1901–1909)

Current flag of Maine

Maine naval ensign

=== Vermont ===
The flag of Vermont uses a pine tree and pine branches in its design.

Flag of Vermont

== Recent usage (1960s–present) ==
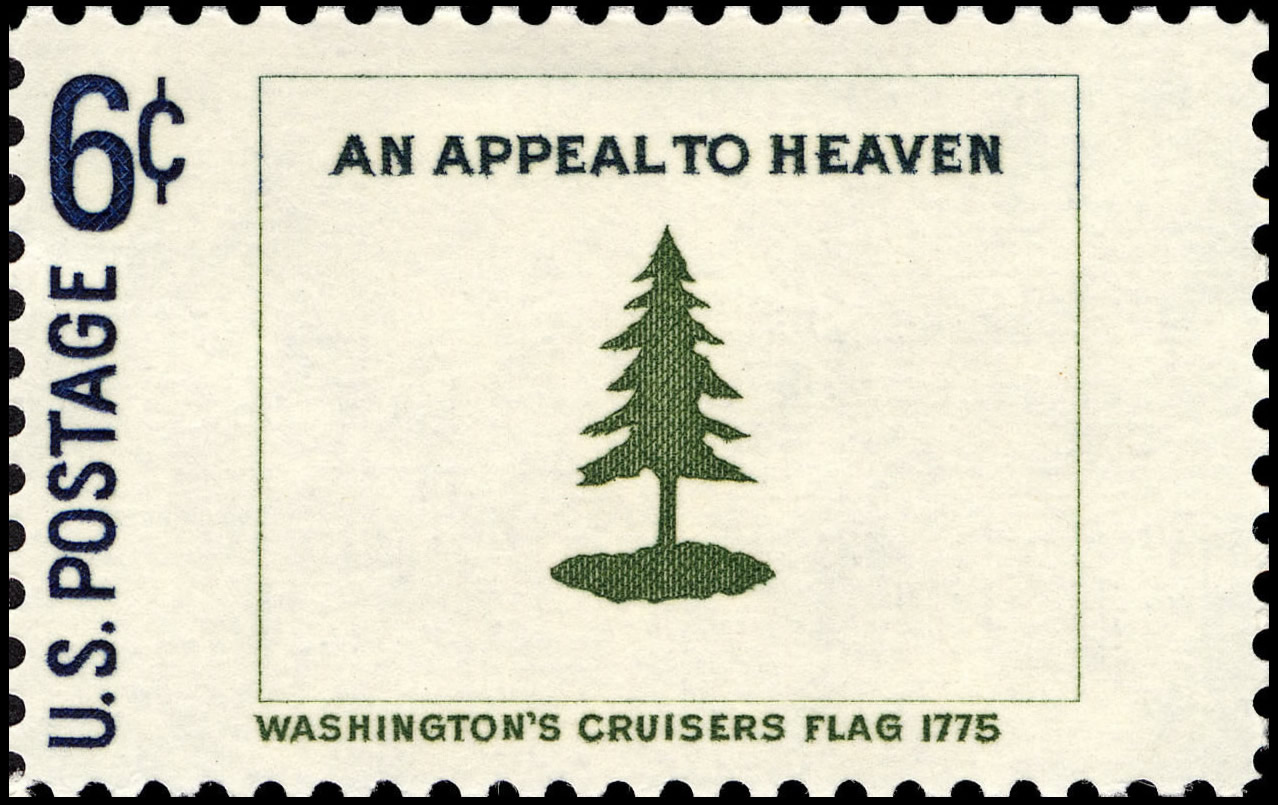
1968 U.S. postage stamp featuring "Washington's Cruisers Flag"

In 1968, the Pine Tree flag, or "Washington's Cruisers Flag," was featured in the 6¢ Historic American Flags postage stamp series printed by the Bureau of Engraving and Printing.

From 1964 to 2024, the flag was flown outside San Francisco City Hall as part of a collection of historic American flags. It is also displayed at Faneuil Hall in Boston, in the Museum of the Ancient and Honorable Artillery Company of Massachusetts.

The Appeal to Heaven Flag has been used by Christian nationalists in the United States since 2013. The origins of the Appeal to Heaven flag as an emblem of the Christian nationalist movement in the United States trace to 2013, when Pentecostal cleric Dutch Sheets received the flag as a gift and prophesied that it would be the "symbol of a campaign to restore America to the Christian nation God intended." The flag was given to governor of Alaska Sarah Palin, who advocated for the Appeal to Heaven Flag to be flown "over courthouses and statehouses." In the 2020s, the flag was flown at events attended by various Christian right and far-right groups including a Christian nationalist strand of Donald Trump's "Stop the Steal" movement. The flag was carried by several of the US Capitol rioters on January 6, 2021.

In May 2024, news outlets reported that the flag had been flown at the vacation home of U.S. Supreme Court Justice Samuel Alito in 2023. This drew media attention because the flag had been used by "Stop the Steal" supporters. The justice stated that his wife had displayed the flag, referred to the historic background of the symbol, and refused to recuse himself from ongoing cases involving the 2020 United States presidential election.

As of 2024, "pine tree symbolism is ubiquitous" in New England, with the Pine Tree Flag "a well-known icon", and proposals to change the Maine state flag to the Pine Tree Flag had support from members of both the Republican and Democratic parties. The Maine Pine Tree Flag is different: it contains a star and no writing.

== Gallery ==
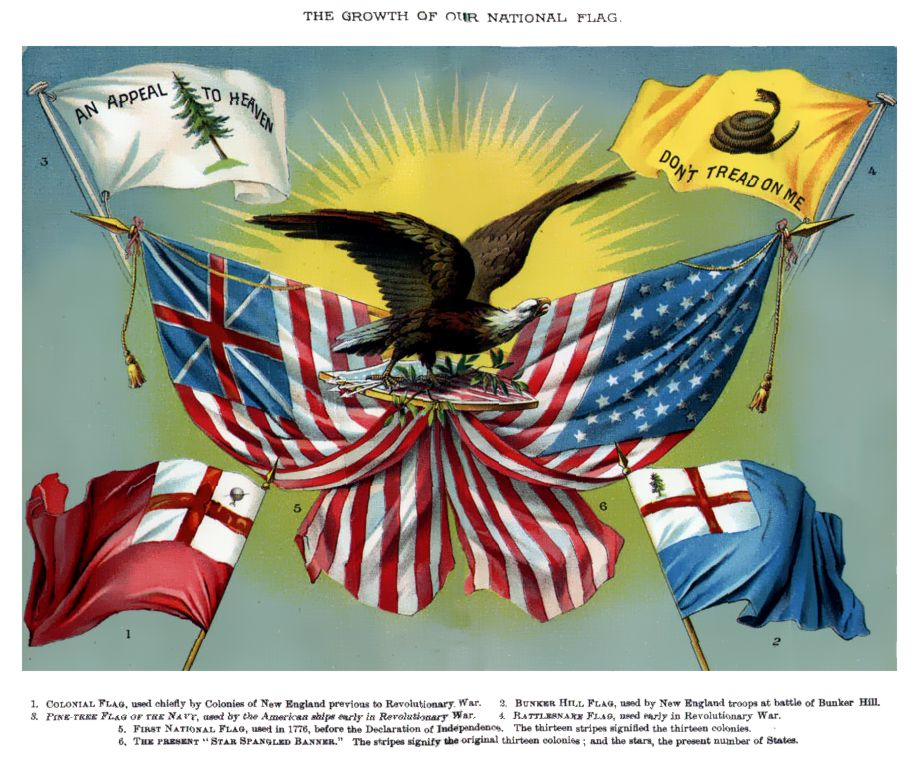
American school textbook, 1885, depicting: Pine Tree Flag, Gadsden flag, American flag, Bunker Hill flag, Flag of New England, and Continental Union Flag

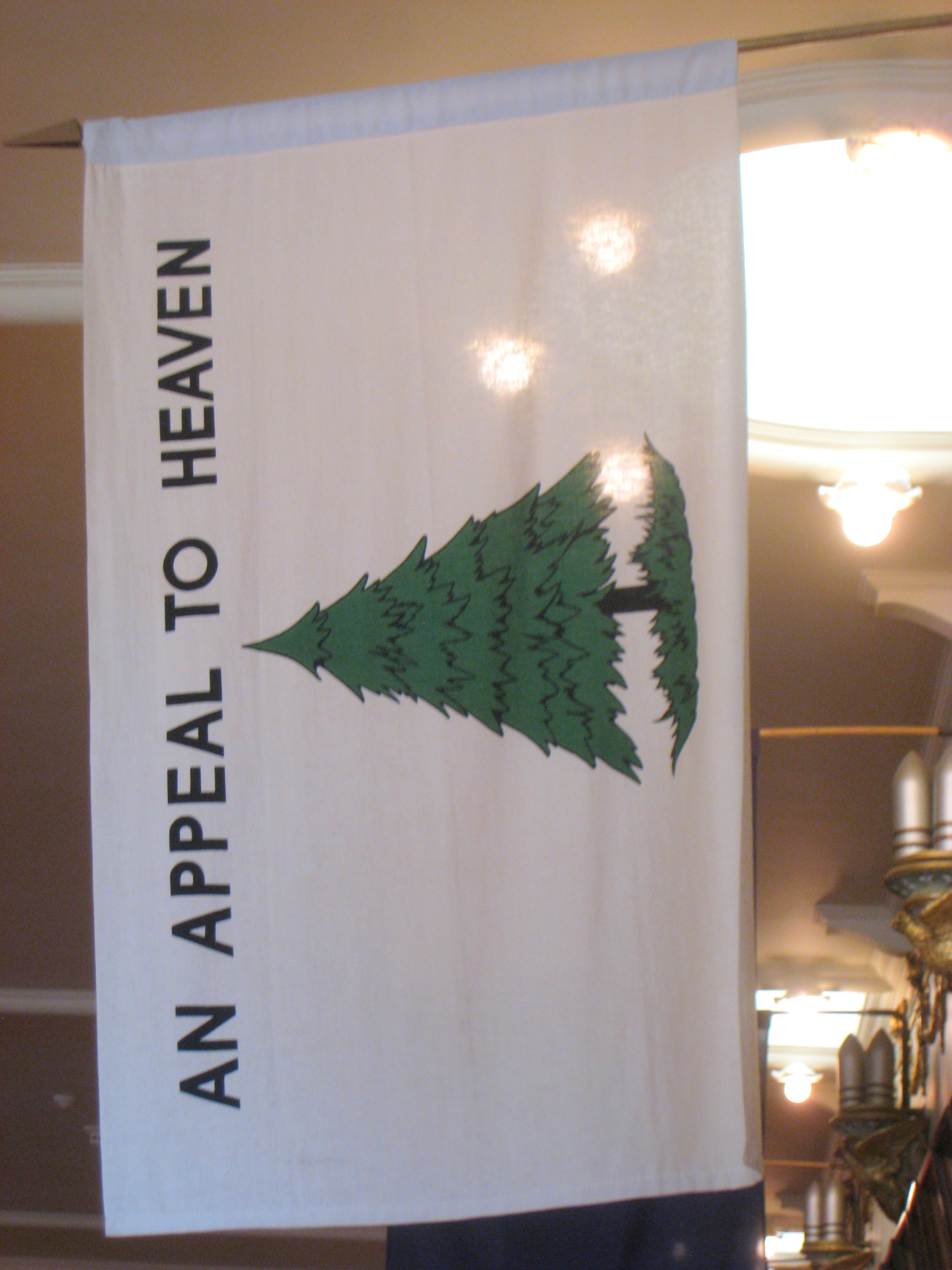
The flag displayed in Faneuil Hall, Boston, 2010

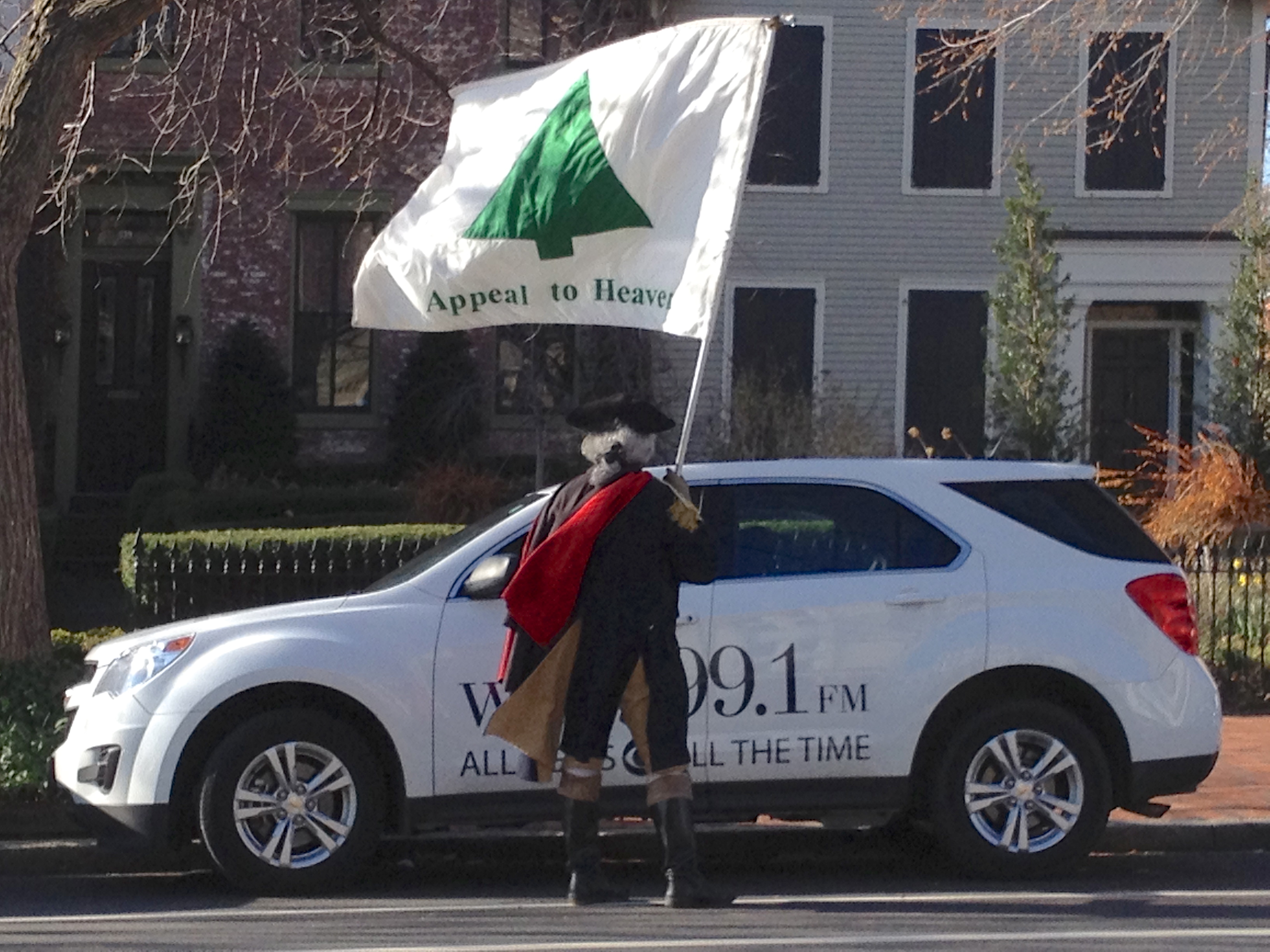
Man in Colonial American costume with the flag, March 2013

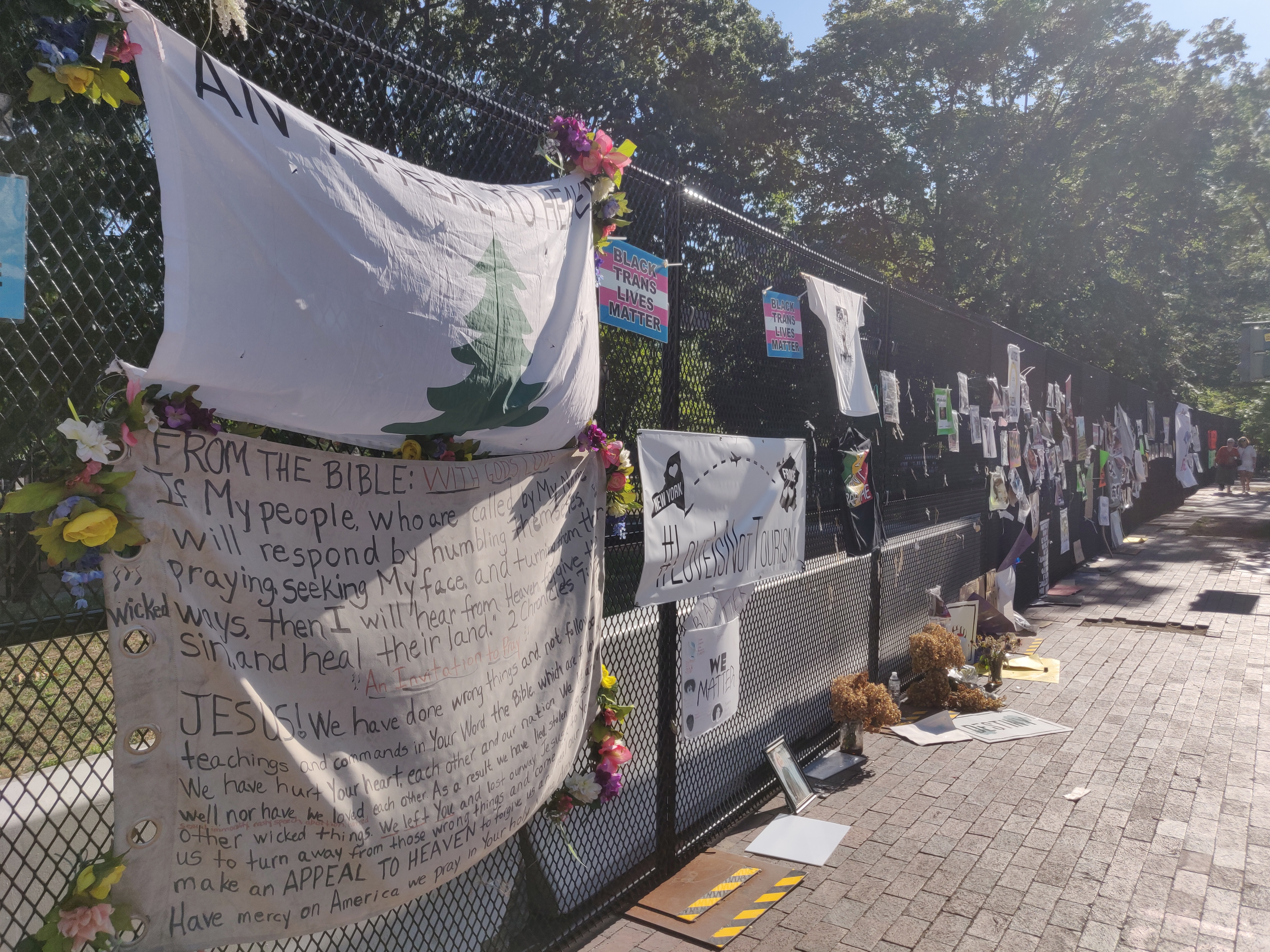
Pine Tree Flag being displayed at a Black Lives Matter protest, July 2020

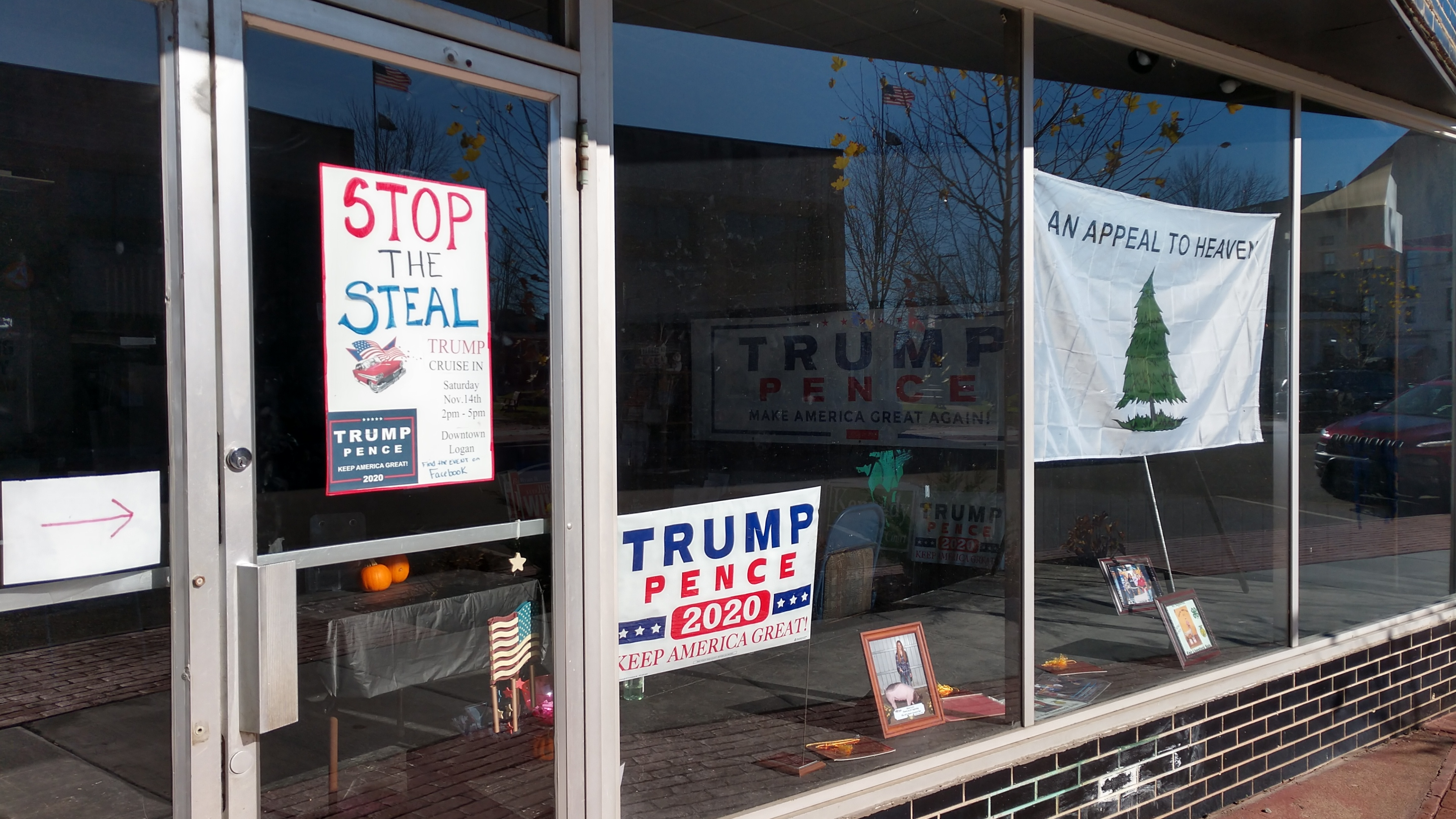
Pine Tree Flag on display at a "Trump victory center", November 2020

The flag displayed at the Parthenon House of Prayer, Parthenon, Arkansas, 2024

== See also ==
- American Enlightenment
- Christian Flag
- Doug flag
- Flag of Norfolk Island
- Thompson's War
