= Viles Arboretum =

Arboretum and botanical garden in Augusta, Maine, United States

Coordinates: 44°18′00″N 69°45′50″W

- Interactive map of Viles Arboretum
- Website: Official website

The Viles Arboretum (formerly known as the Pine Tree State Arboretum) 224 acres (90.6 hectares) is a botanical garden and arboretum located in Augusta, Maine, United States, with 5 miles (8 km) of trails, open year round without charge. The plant collection contains over 300 species or varieties of trees and shrubs. The forested portion of the Arboretum is a certified Tree Farm Demonstration Area containing many of Maine's native trees.

It is a popular day hiking spot for people of all ages, as well as bird watching.

The Arboretum's principal tree collections and gardens are as follows:

- Urban & Community Forestry Demonstration Area — The Arboretum's largest collection; over six dozen specimens chosen for their durability in the urban environment.
- Conifer Collection — North American varieties chosen for interesting characteristics (like the weeping white pine), and other species from around the world.
- Governors Grove — Over 60 Eastern White Pine, Maine's state tree, each planted in honor of one of Maine's governors.
- Chestnut Collection — A display of the American chestnut and its close relatives. With help from The American Chestnut Foundation, the Arboretum is developing a Chestnut Plantation with seedlings representing all of Maine's surviving American Chestnuts.
- Daughters of the American Revolution Historical Gardens — Chosen for aesthetic, medicinal, culinary and home-use qualities, these flowers, herbs and shrubs would have been found in gardens around the time of the American Revolution.
- Lilac Collection — A collection of lilac varieties blooming white, pink and purple in May.
- Hosta Garden — Winding through the shade of a white birch grove, this collection of hosta varieties, one of the largest in Maine, was donated by the Case Estate of the Arnold Arboretum in Massachusetts.
- Native Plant Garden — This newest garden has been incorporated into the landscaping for the new Education Wing of the Viles Visitors Center. It features native plants that are readily available from Maine garden centers and nurseries and encourages visitors to consider using more native plants in their home landscape and avoid using non-native plants that may escape into the wild.

== See also ==
- List of botanical gardens in the United States
