= Flag of Maine =

U.S. state flag

State of Maine
- Maine State Flag
- Use: Civil and state flag
- Proportion: 26:33
- Adopted: February 23, 1909; 117 years ago
- Design: A state coat of arms on a blue field.
- Maine Merchant and Marine Flag
- Use: Ensign
- Adopted: March 16, 1939; 87 years ago
- Design: Green pine tree with a blue anchor around its base on a white field with "DIRIGO" in blue above the pine tree and "MAINE" in blue below

The flag of Maine was adopted by the U.S. state on February 23, 1909. Its design consists of the state's coat of arms on a blue field. In the center of a heraldic shield, a moose rests under a tall pine tree. A farmer and seaman are meant to represent the traditional reliance on agriculture and the sea by the state. The North Star is intended to allude to the state motto: dirigo ('I lead'). Maine also uses an ensign with a different design; this flag was adopted on March 16, 1939.

== Statute ==
The 2024 Maine Revised Statutes, Title 1, § 206 defines that the flag shall be:

"blue, of the same color as the blue field in the flag of the United States, and of the following dimensions and designs; to wit, the length or height of the staff to be 9 feet, including brass spearhead and ferrule; the fly of said flag to be 5 feet 6 inches [1.68 m], and to be 4 feet 4 inches [1.32 m] on the staff; in the center of the flag there shall be embroidered in silk on both sides of the flag the coat of arms of the State, in proportionate size."

It is further specified that the edges of the flag should "be trimmed with knotted fringe of yellow silk", 2 1/2 inches [64 mm] wide, and that the flag should have a blue and white silk cord, 8 feet 6 inches [2.59 m] long, attached at the spearhead. These embellishments are very rarely observed. A concluding note states that "a flag made in accordance with the description given in this section shall be kept in the office of the Adjutant General as a model."

The coat of arms is indirectly defined by 1 M.R.S. § 201 (State Seal), but with no official colors stated, so variations in coloration can be seen in flags from different manufacturers.

=== Design of the coat of arms ===
The coat of arms of Maine, adopted in June 1820, contains:

- Pine tree
- Moose
- Water and wooded landscape
- Farmer (husbandman) resting on a scythe
- Sailor (seaman) resting on an anchor
- North Star / "Polar Star"
- Label inscribed with the motto DIRIGO (Latin "I direct" or "I lead")
- Banner reading "MAINE"

No definitive authorship is established; the original drawing in the state archives is unsigned. The design concept is traditionally attributed to Benjamin Vaughan of Hallowell. The official description and explanation were written by Col. Isaac Reed of Waldoboro. The original sketch has been variously attributed either to Bertha Smouse, Reed's step-daughter (per local 19th–20th century claims), or to one of Vaughan's daughters.

Multiple artistic variants circulated throughout the 19th century. In 1919, the legislature ordered that the design should no longer vary, producing the standardized modern form commonly credited to illustrator Henry Gibson.

== History ==
=== Pre-official flags (before 1901) ===
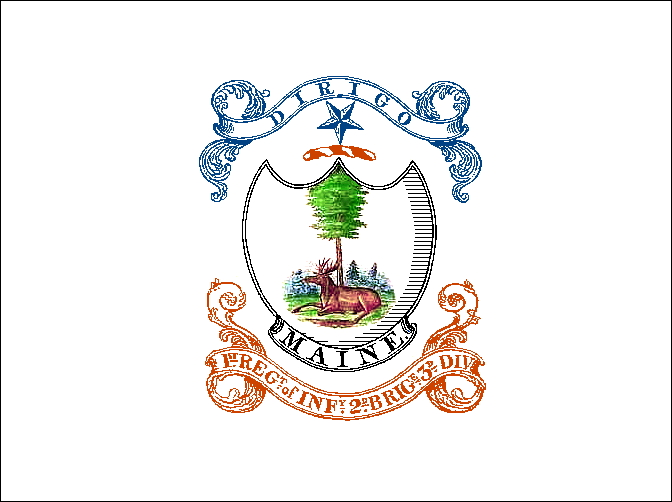
Maine Militia flag (1822–1861)

One of several flags used by the 20th Maine Infantry Regiment during the Civil War

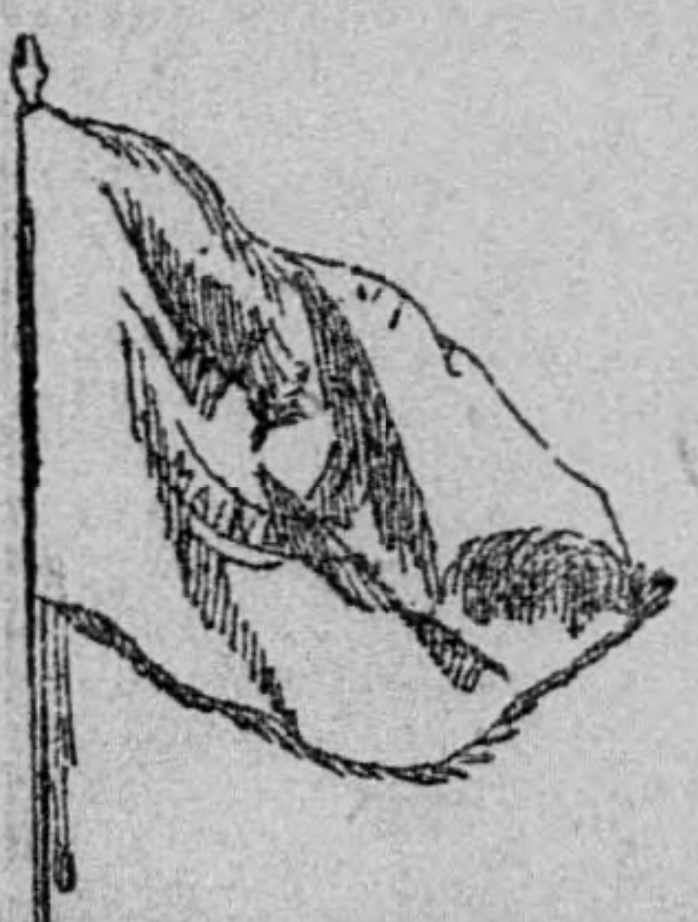
Governor's flag, 1895

Maine had a semi-official state color used by its militia from 1822 to 1861. After separating from Massachusetts in 1820, the Maine Adjutant General Samuel Cony needed to supply flags for Maine's approximately 100 militia companies because one of the articles of separation required Maine to return all militia flags (but it failed to mention poles, which were retained and reused). Casting about for a cost-effective method of producing such quantity of flags, he engaged John R. Penniman of Boston in 1822 to provide a suitable design which was engraved onto a copper plate and then printed onto silk in multi-colors, the first known production of such for flags. A second printing was done in 1827. About a dozen or so portions of these flags still exist, including one at the Maine Historical Society still mounted on its original pole. The last known instance of a Maine militia unit using this flag was in 1861 at the First Battle of Bull Run, which was recorded as being captured by Confederate forces.

Digital reconstruction of state flag flown in Gardiner, 1892

Several flags were used by the 20th Maine Infantry Regiment during the Civil War.

According to the San Diego Union and Daily Bee, a state flag was carried in Chicago on July 4, 1880, but its design was not described.

In 1887, the state house held a huge party to celebrate a holiday. The whole building was decorated with the Governor's room containing his personal flag. It had a blue field bearing the coat of arms of the state center in gold with some golden stars.

There was a state flag hanging in the council chamber at the State House in 1891, the design is unknown.

In 1892, the city of Gardiner held a huge parade to celebrate Columbus Day. During the parade one of the local high-schools carried out a flag with two bars of red and white bearing the states coat of arms in the middle.

In 1897, a military parade in was held in Camp Powers in which they march to the State House. While outside the State House the members of the national guard displayed a state flag containing a blue field with the states coat of arms.

During the Spanish-American War the ship USS Merrimac flew a massive blue flag bearing the state's name in large letters. It was lost when the ship sunk in June.

In 1901, a state flag was proposed by senator Walls in the State House. It was described as having a blue field with the states coat of arms in the center, similar to the modern one.

=== First flag (1901–1909) ===
State flag (1901–1909)

Modern version of the 1901 flag, featuring the pine as illustrated on the merchant and marine flag

The first flag of Maine was adopted on March 21, 1901 and consisted of a green pine tree, a New England symbol that represented freedom, in the center, with a blue "North Star", all on a buff-colored background. The flag was used as a state and military flag. The flag was also displayed over the Maine building during the 1904 St. Louis Exposition. It was flown next to a unique pennant bearing a white field with the state's name in red letters and a blue star. Only one contemporary state flag is known to still exist today.

=== Current flag ===
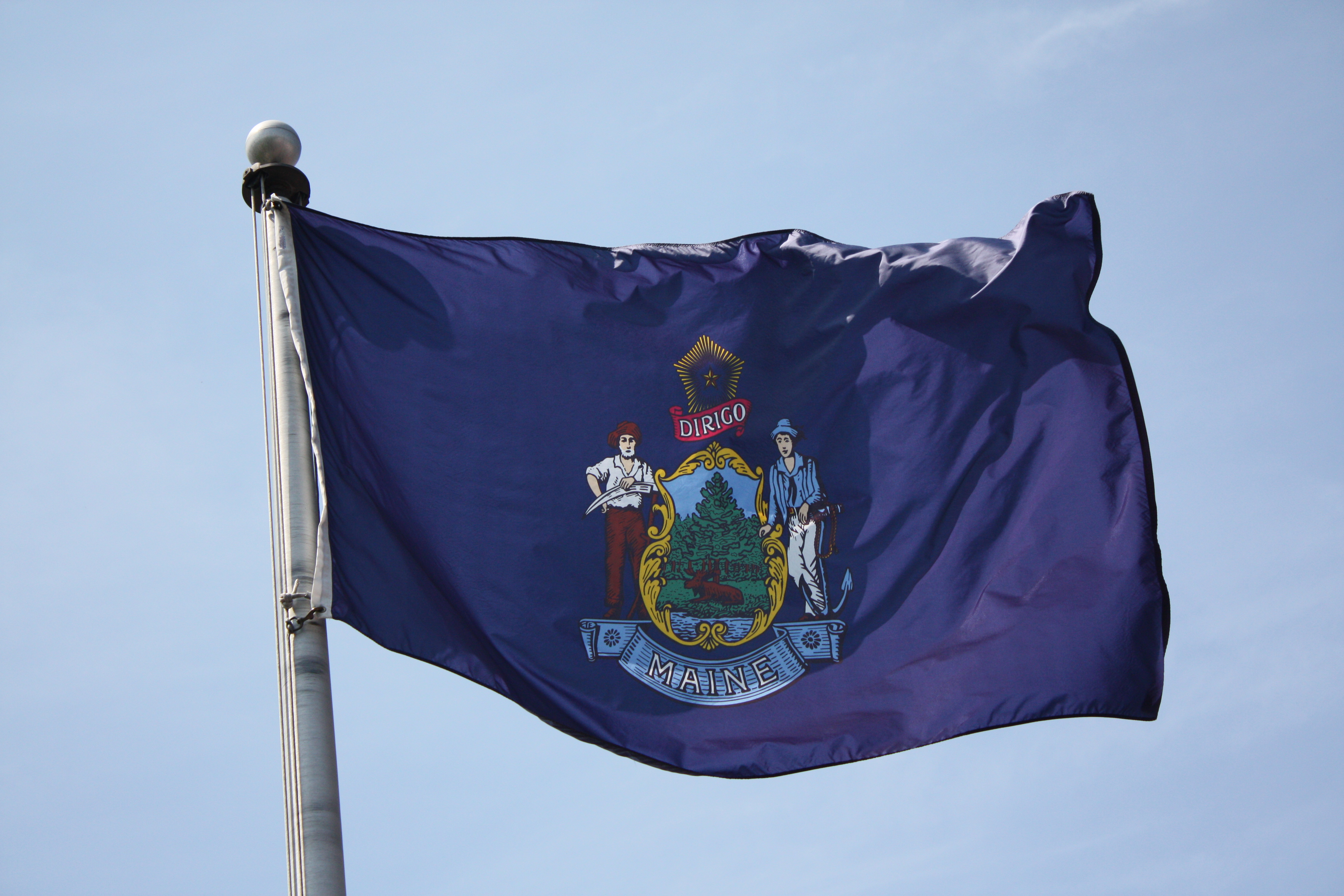
The flag flying

The Maine legislature approved the current flag of Maine on February 24, 1909. To honor Union veterans, the flag was modeled after flags used by Maine's units in the American Civil War: As one newspaper wrote, "The Union Blue of the traditional Maine flag honors the legacy of our forbearers and the sacrifices [made] to save the Union and Free the Slaves." There were variants of the state flag carried by the national guard bearing 2 red scrolls above and below the coat of arms, containing the number of the regiment and name national guard.

=== Ensign ===
Merchant and marine flag of Maine

Maine is also one of two states with a separate ensign, which is rarely seen (the other is Massachusetts). It features symbols from the current flag and the older one, with a white field and green pine tree. The green pine tree has the foul anchor, and the words "MAINE" and "DIRIGO" around it.

A photograph of the earliest-known specimen of the Maine merchant and marine flag was featured in a June 1939 International News Photos wire photo.

=== 2020 Bicentennial flag ===
Maine Bicentennial Flag

In 2019, Maine lawmakers introduced a bill to adopt a simpler flag for the state, based on the original 1901 flag. A flag with a buff background, a blue star, and green pine tree from the Merchant and Marine flag, created by the Maine Flag Company, was one of the proposed options. Maine resident Jeff Van West also submitted a design for the new flag. His flag had a white star on a dark blue of a night sky over a lighter blue representing the rivers, ponds, and oceanfront of Maine. He had the tree extend off the flag border to give the feeling of being in the forest looking out over the water.

The measure to change the state flag failed. However, the legislature approved creating a flag for Maine's Bicentennial in 2020. Secretary of State Matt Dunlap submitted three designs for public comment: one of his own design, one using the Maine Bicentennial Committee logo, and a third based on Van West's flag, but replacing the white star with the red/gold/white Dirigo Star from the state flag. After the third design won the contest, Van West offered Dunlap a further revision replacing the multicolored Dirigo Star with a monochromatic white version. Dunlap approved that design as the Maine 2020 Bicentennial Flag.

A grass-roots movement to adopt a modernized version of the 1901 flag has since sprung up.

=== 2024 redesign and referendum ===
Winning design of the 2024 state flag redesign contest

In November 2024, the state held a referendum on whether to restore the 1901 flag or keep the current one. The referendum had initially been scheduled for 2023, but the Maine Legislature delayed it until 2024. The Legislature then attempted a further delay until 2027, which was vetoed by Governor Janet Mills. On August 5, 2024, the winner of the flag redesign contest was announced, with honors going to Adam Lemire of Gardiner, Maine. His design, chosen out of more than 400 entries, features a pine tree modeled after one he saw in Viles Arboretum in Augusta, Maine. It has sixteen branches, one for each of Maine's counties. The referendum, held as part of the 2024 United States elections, saw the proposed flag rejected by 55% to 45%.

Had the referendum passed, the Maine state flag would have been defined as follows:

"buff, charged with the emblem of the State, a pine tree proper, in the center, and the North Star, a mullet of 5 points, in blue in the upper corner; the star to be equidistant from the hoist and the upper border of the flag, the distance from the two borders to the center of the star being equal to about one-fourth of the hoist, this distance and the size of the star being proportionate to the size of the flag."

== Related flags ==
An early flag of the Massachusetts Bay Colony with the Saint George's Cross of England removed. Maine was a part of the Massachusetts Bay Colony.

After the union of England and Scotland, some New England ensigns used the British Union Flag rather than the Saint George's Cross.

The first flag (and ensign) of New England, used by Colonial merchant ships sailing out of New England ports, 1686-c. 1737.

The flag of New England during the Revolutionary War.

Flag flown during the Dominion of New England using the personal standard of Edmund Andros.

Flag of the short-lived Republic of Madawaska, which was situated between Canada and the US.

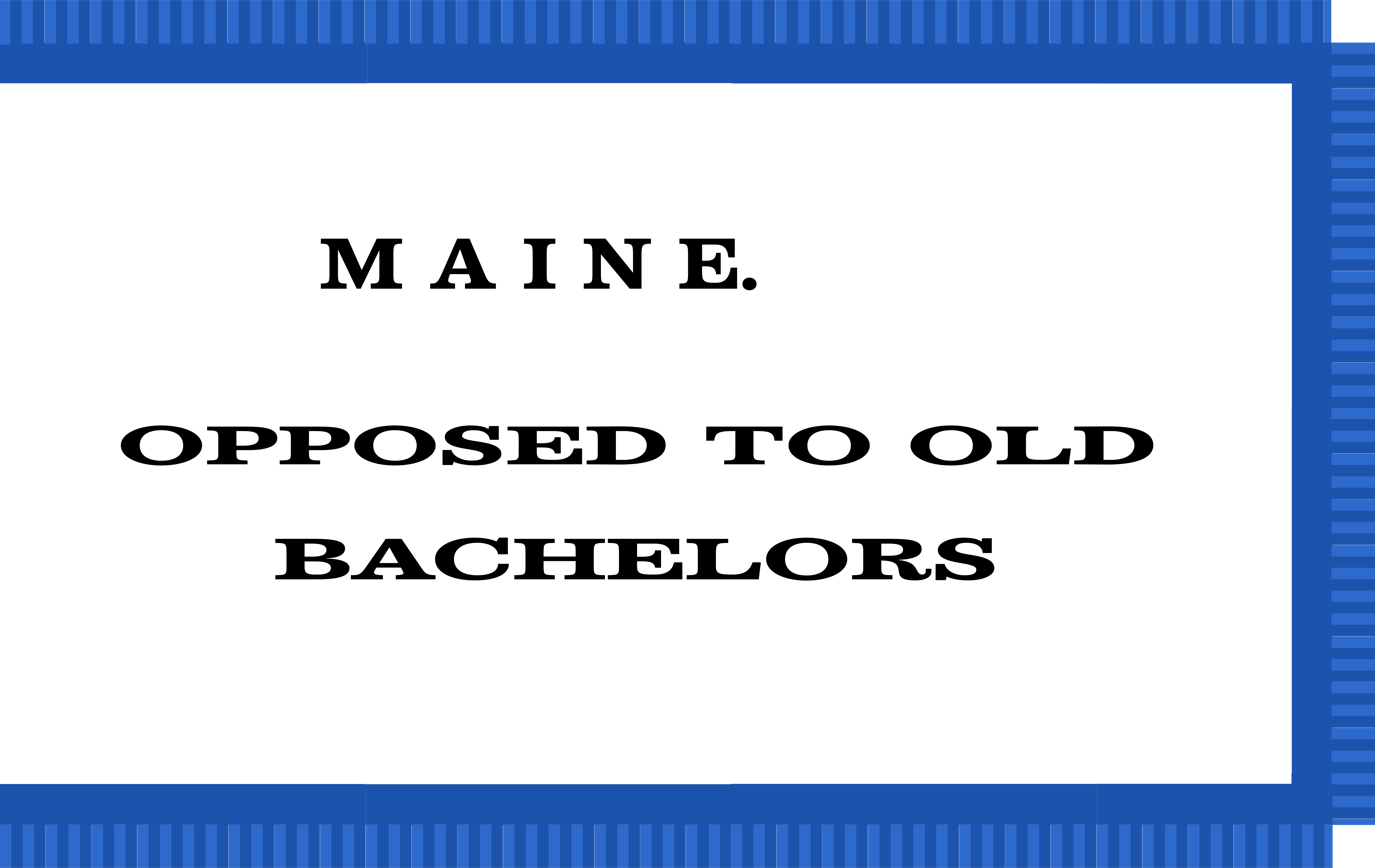
John C. Frémont campaign flag used in Maine, 1856.

== See also ==
- Flag of Massachusetts
- Symbols of the state of Maine
- Flag of New England
