= Maine Capitol Police =

Maine Bureau of Capitol Police
- Common name: Maine Capitol Police or Capitol Police
- Abbreviation: MCP

Agency overview
- Formed: 1967; 59 years ago (first officer hired) 2009; 17 years ago (in its current form)

Jurisdictional structure
- Operations jurisdiction: Maine, USA
- Governing body: Maine Department of Public Safety
- General nature: Civilian police
- Specialist jurisdiction: Buildings and other fixed assets

Operational structure
- Headquarters: Cross State Office Building, Augusta, ME
- Officers: 13
- Security screeners: 6
- Agency executive: Stephen Trahan, Lieutenant (acting chief)
- Parent agency: Maine State Police

Website
- https://www.maine.gov/dps/capitol-police

The Maine Capitol Police (MCP), officially the Bureau of Capitol Police, is the capitol police agency of the state of Maine which provided security policing services to the Maine State House, the state house grounds, and other state properties as-assigned (including the Riverview Psychiatric Center). Sworn MCP officers have full police powers across the state of Maine. MCP personnel conduct patrol operations and enforce state laws, enforce parking and traffic regulations, and assist other agencies when necessary. The MCP also employs non-sworn "security screeners" for basic entry control and security tasks.

In 2025, the Bangor Daily News reported that the Maine State Police would absorb the duties the MCP gradually, replacing MCP officers with state troopers as MCP officers retire or otherwise leave the MCP. The Daily News also reported that the Maine State Police would assume management of MCP indefinitely. However, a 2026 bill to merge the agencies was defeated in the Maine legislature.

== History ==
In 1967/8, Maine Governor Kenneth M. Curtis appointed Robert Sears, a custodian and part-time police officer, to police the State House grounds. Sears held the title of " building and grounds officer", wore a uniform in the style of the Maine Warden Service, with a patch that read “State House Police”, and used a Cushman motor scooter. Sears controlled parking around the State House and State Office Building, and provided security on the premises. General security services for the Capitol complex were provided by night watchpersons, part of the Bureau of Public Improvements.

The Capitol Security Police Force was formed in 1968, as part of the Bureau of Public Improvements. The force consisted of the Chief, Officer Sears and a number of watchpersons, and was added to by a number of security guards in 1971 when the Maine State Library, Maine State Museum and Maine State Archives opened in the Cultural Building next to the State House. The guards were retitled Capitol Security Police Officers in 1977, following the bombings of several public buildings in New England and the Central Maine Power Company in Augusta. The force was formed as the Bureau of Capitol Security within the Maine Department of Public Safety. In 1982, the Capitol Police took on responsibility for the Augusta Mental Health Institute and grounds, and the force had a total of eleven officers. In 1979, Donald Suitter was appointed chief.

In 1990, the night watchpersons were reassigned to Capitol security, bringing the state government buildings in Hallowell within the responsibility of the Capitol Police. Officer Robert Sears, the original Capitol Police Officer, retired in 1994.

In 2004, budget meant the bureau could no longer provide round-the-clock services. By 2006, when Donald Suitter retired, further budget cuts had reduced the force to three watchpersons and six police officers. Russell Gauvin, a retired Portland Police Department captain, was appointed as his replacement and began to modernize the Capitol Police, including the introduction of telescopic batons, a dedicated channel for police radios and a computer-aided dispatch system.

In 2009, the Legislature changed the name of the Bureau of Capitol Security to the Bureau of Capitol Police (becoming commonly known as the "Maine Capitol Police", "capitol police", or "MCP") and gave the public safety commissioner the power to expand the jurisdiction of sworn MCP personnel from "all state owned or controlled property in Augusta" to full, statewide jurisdiction, which the commissioner optioned to do.

In 2011, the MCP took on further responsibilities for policing the state buildings, from the Augusta Police Department. The number of police officers was increased, and in 2012 the police started screening visitors to the State House for weapons. In 2013, the police were further increased in size to 13 officers, supported by two watchpersons and four screeners, with the establishment of a permanent presence at the Riverview Psychiatric Center.

=== 2020 presidential election aftermath ===
In January 2021, MCP chief Russel Gauvin apologised for a series of social media posts he posted "deriding mask mandates, questioning the results of the presidential election and supporting a police officer who called for violence against Black Lives Matter protesters". Governor Janet Mills and Public Safety Commissioner Michael Sauschuck said they were "troubled and concerned" by the posts, and placed Gauvin under investigation. On 20 January, Gauvin was temporarily replaced by Lt. Robert Elliot following a letter from over 70 members of the Legislature expressing concern about his leadership.

=== 2025 chief's arrest and resignation ===
In 2025, the MCP's then-chief, Matthew Clancy, a former Massachusetts police officer, was arrested after an "altercation" in a Maine bar. In October 2025, Clancy resigned his post. The agency's lieutenant assumed the post of acting-chief.

=== 2025-2026 possible amalgamation with the Maine State Police ===
In 2025, the Bangor Daily News reported that the Maine State Police would absorb the duties the MCP gradually, replacing MCP officers with state troopers as MCP officers retire or otherwise leave the MCP. The Daily News also reported that the Maine State Police would assume management of MCP indefinitely.

In 2026 bill LD 2165 was proposed to the Maine Legislature; passage would have amalgamated the MCP into the Maine State Police. The bill was defeated in March 2026; the MCP will remain under the Maine State Police's control and supervision but will not be merged into it.

== Duties ==
The MCP are established by Title 25, s2908 of the Maine Revised Statutes. They are responsible for policing the State House and other State buildings within the Capitol Area campus, operating a metal detector and x-ray machine at the entrance to the State House. They also police the buildings on the opposite side of the Kennebec River, the "East Side Campus" (until 2004 the Augusta Mental Health Institute), with an office at Riverview Psychiatric Center. Non-sworn watchpersons are responsible for providing security at around 50 state-owned facilities in Augusta and Hallowell outside normal business hours.

During the financial year 2019-20, the Capitol Police logged 47,262 events, incidents or activities, of which 77 turned into criminal investigations, including assault, trespass and theft. 191 traffic summonses/warnings were issued and 492 parking tickets, in addition to investigating 8 traffic collisions. The Police issued 56 permits for activities around the State House, in Capitol Park, or elsewhere in the Capitol Area.

== See also ==
- List of law enforcement agencies in Maine
- Capitol police
