= Guy P. Gannett House =

Historic house in Maine, United States

- U.S. National Register of Historic Places
- U.S. Historic district – Contributing property
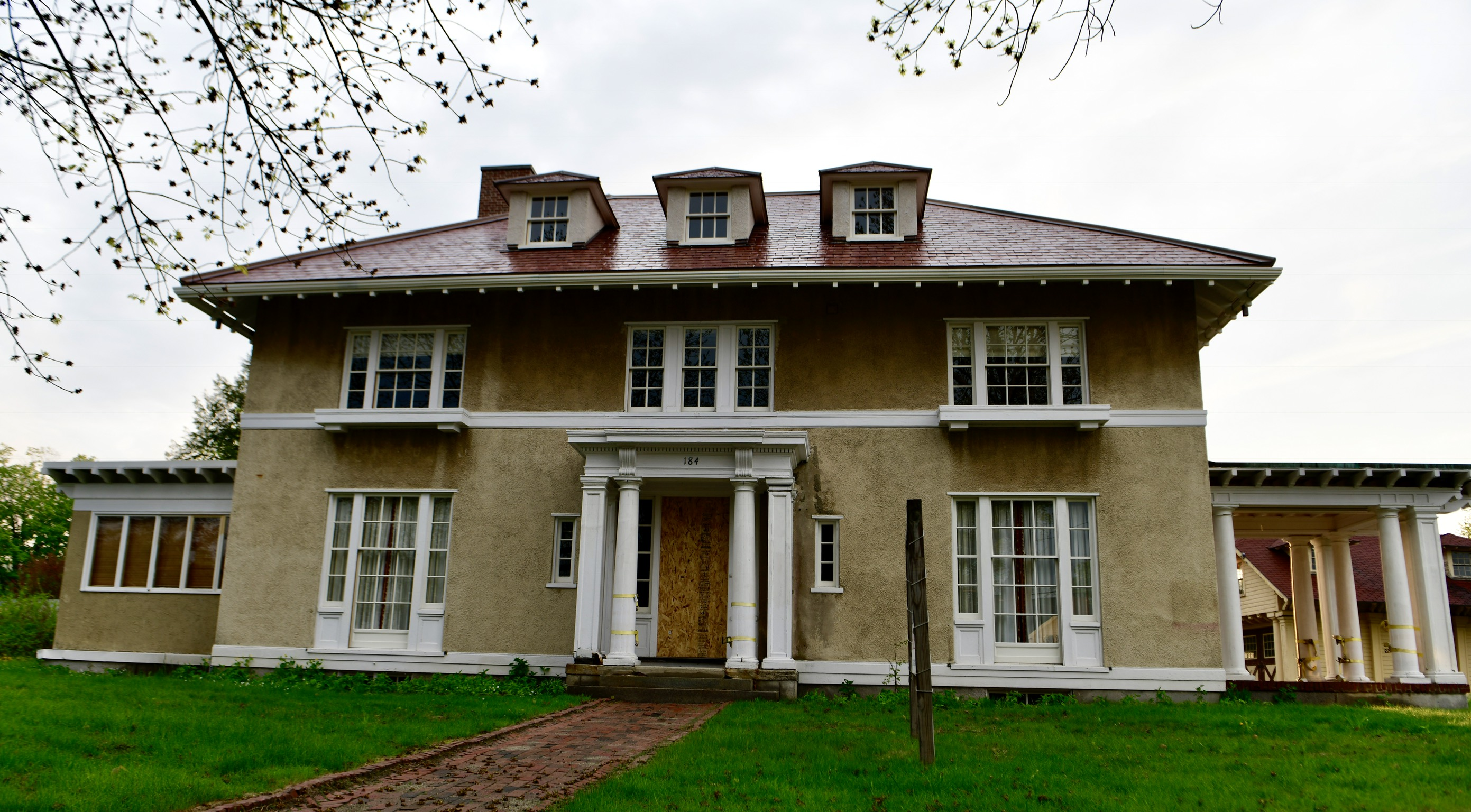

- Location within Maine Location within the United States
- Location: 184 State St. Augusta, Maine
- Coordinates: 44°18′32″N 69°46′52″W
- Area: 0.5 acres (0.20 ha)
- Built: 1911
- Architect: Thomas Marriott James
- Architectural style: Mediterranean Revival
- Part of: Capitol Complex Historic District (ID01001417)
- NRHP reference No.: 83000455

Significant dates
- Added to NRHP: April 28, 1983
- Designated CP: December 31, 2001

The Guy P. Gannett House is a historic house at 184 State Street in Augusta, Maine. Built in 1911 to a design by Boston architect Thomas Marriott James, it is the only significant example of Mediterranean Revival architecture in Kennebec County. It was listed on the National Register of Historic Places in 1983.

== Description and history ==
The Guy P. Gannett House stands on the west side of State Street (United States Route 201) in the city's Capitol Complex. It stands just north of The Blaine House, the official residence of the governor of Maine, and is owned by the state as part of a buffer around that property. It is a basically square 2 1/2-story wood-frame structure, with a hip roof that has deep eaves showing exposed rafter ends, stuccoed exterior walls, and a granite foundation. Single-story porches extend to the north and south, and a two-story ell extends to the rear. The front facade faces east, and is symmetrically arranged. It is three bays wide, with a single-story porch extending across the center bay. The main entrance is at the center, with flanking sidelight windows. The porch is supported by Tuscan columns, and has a metal balcony railing above. Windows in the side bays are three-part, with narrow side elements flanking larger central ones in a Palladian style.

The house was built in 1911 to a design by Boston architect Thomas Marriott James. It was the most expensive house built in Augusta that year. It was built for Guy P. Gannett, one of the most important figures in Maine's newspaper publishing industry. The house was a showcase of modern conveniences of the period, including electric light fixtures, and an elevator for bringing firewood up from the basement. It also has an early example of a whole house vacuum cleaning system. At the time of its listing on the National Register in 1983, it housed the state's planning office.

The building changed hands in recent years and is now home to the First Amendment Museum, which was founded by Genie Gannett and Terry Hopkins, the granddaughters of Guy Gannett.

== See also ==
- National Register of Historic Places listings in Kennebec County, Maine
