= Capitol Park (Augusta, Maine) =

- U.S. National Register of Historic Places
- U.S. Historic district – Contributing property
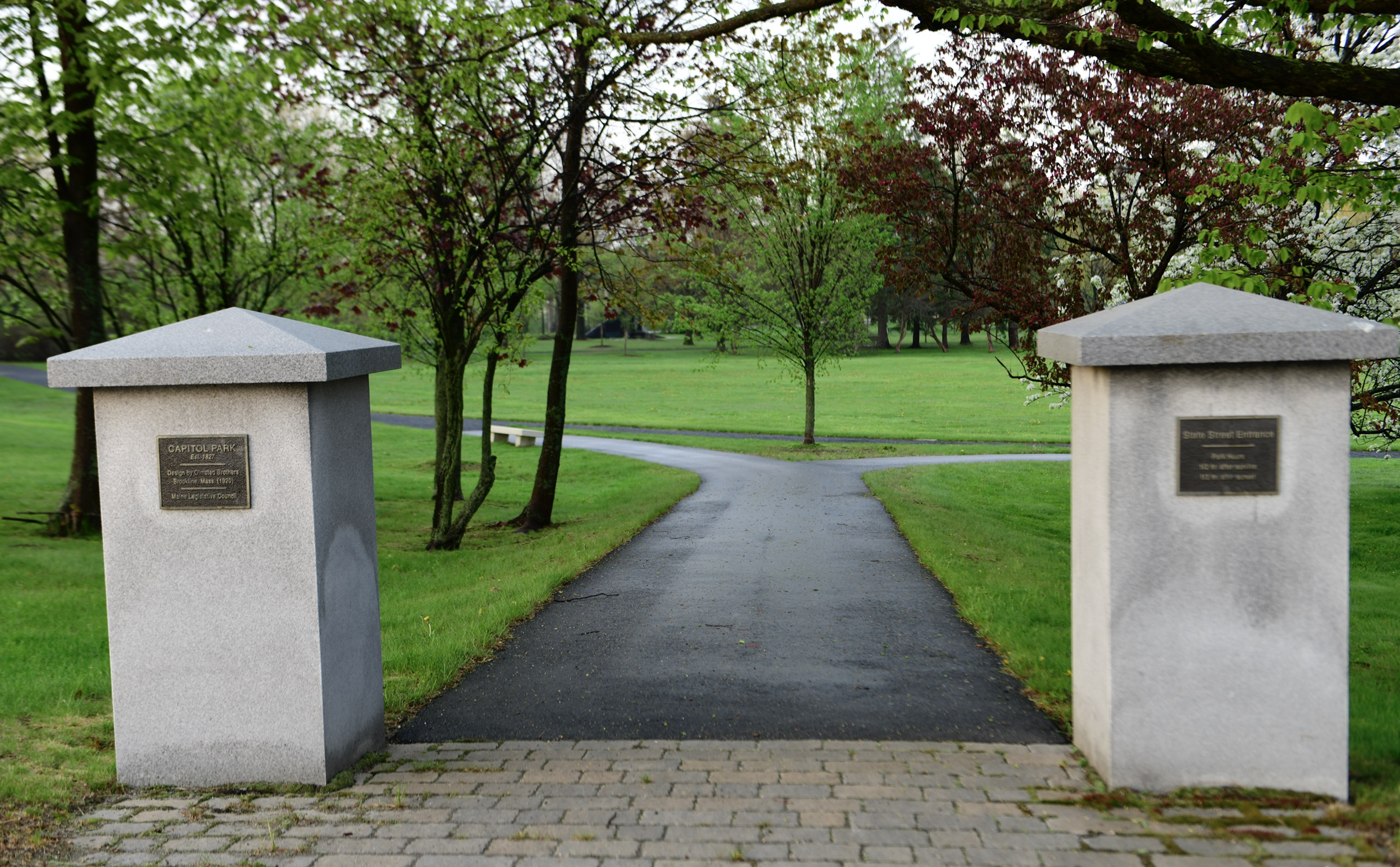

- Location within Maine Location within the United States
- Location: Roughly bounded by Capitol St., Kennebec River, Union St., and State St., Augusta, Maine
- Coordinates: 44°18′23″N 69°46′43″W
- Area: 20 acres (8.1 ha)
- Built: 1827
- Architect: Olmsted Brothers
- Part of: Capitol Complex Historic District (ID01001417)
- NRHP reference No.: 89000252

Significant dates
- Added to NRHP: April 7, 1989
- Designated CP: December 31, 2001

Capitol Park is a state-owned public park in Maine's state capitol complex on the west side of Augusta, Maine. Set aside in 1827, when the complex was established, the park, set between the Maine State House and the Kennebec River, served as a parade ground and encampment site during the American Civil War, and saw agricultural use before being formally designed as a park in the 1920s by the Olmsted Brothers. The park was listed on the National Register of Historic Places in 1989.

== Description and history ==
Capitol Park is located on the western bank of the Kennebec River, from which it is separated by a former railroad right-of-way. It is about 20 acres (8.1 ha) in size, and roughly rectangular in shape, bounded by Capitol, State, and Union Streets. The terrain slopes upward from the river to State Street, which separates the park from the grounds of the Maine State House.

The people of Augusta gave the state the parcel of land that makes up the park and state house grounds in 1827, laying out State Street to provide access. The state planted a line of trees along State Street, and also established a boulevard from the state house site to the river. As part of the landscaping of the state house grounds, Charles Bulfinch articulated a design for the park that established a series of terraces descending to the river. In 1842 a granite monument to Governor Enoch Lincoln was installed near the park's eastern edge. By the 1850s, a second line of trees had been added, with paths along each row providing the main circulation pattern. All of this landscaping was lost when the area was used as a staging ground for the state's troops in the American Civil War.

After the Civil War, the park was plowed, and briefly used for agriculture. By 1878 it had again been converted into a park, with a somewhat similar circulation pattern to its prewar state. In the 1920s, the state hired the Olmsted Brothers to prepare a master landscaping plan for its properties, which included the park, the state house grounds, and the adjacent governor's mansion. Work on the park to implement this design was overseen by Portland landscape architect Carl Rust Parker.

== See also ==
- National Register of Historic Places listings in Kennebec County, Maine
