= MDOC =

MDOC or mDOC may refer to:

- Maine Department of Corrections
- Massachusetts Department of Corrections
- Michigan Department of Corrections
- Mississippi Department of Corrections
- Missouri Department of Corrections
- mDOC, a flash memory module standard by M-Systems
- mdoc, a BSD macro set for man pages
