= State Reform School Historic District =

Historic district in Maine, United States

- U.S. National Register of Historic Places
- U.S. Historic district
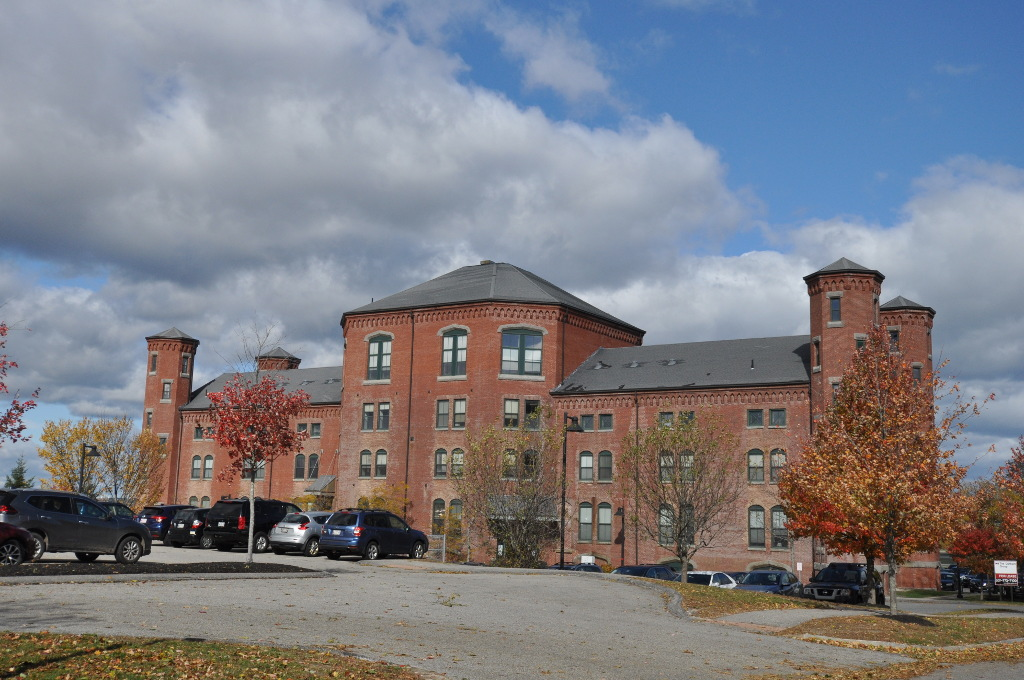
- The former administration building

- Location within Maine Location within the United States
- Location: Westbrook St., South Portland, Maine
- Coordinates: 43°38′14″N 70°18′23″W
- Area: 20 acres (8.1 ha)
- Architect: Bryant, Gridley J.F.; Et al.
- Architectural style: Colonial Revival
- NRHP reference No.: 85000730
- Added to NRHP: April 11, 1985

The State Reform School Historic District encompasses the surviving early buildings of the former Maine State Reform School for Boys off Westbrook Street in South Portland, Maine. The complex was developed between 1850 and 1921, and was redeveloped into apartments and other uses in the 2000s. The area, part of South Portland's Brick Hill neighborhood, was listed on the National Register of Historic Places in 1985.

== Description and history ==
The Maine State Reform School for Boys was authorized by the state in 1850, and was the first juvenile detention facility in the state. Its first building was completed in 1853 to a design by Boston architect Gridley James Fox Bryant, who had a specialization in prison design. The school was enlarged by the construction of "cottages" (small dormitories) in the 1890s and 1900s, designed by Portland architects John Calvin Stevens, George M. Coombs, and Eugene Gibbs. Coombs also oversaw alterations to the Bryant building in 1905–06, when it was converted to exclusively administrative and educational uses. In 1921, the Gould School was added. In the 2000s, the school property was converted to other uses, its cottages converted to residences.

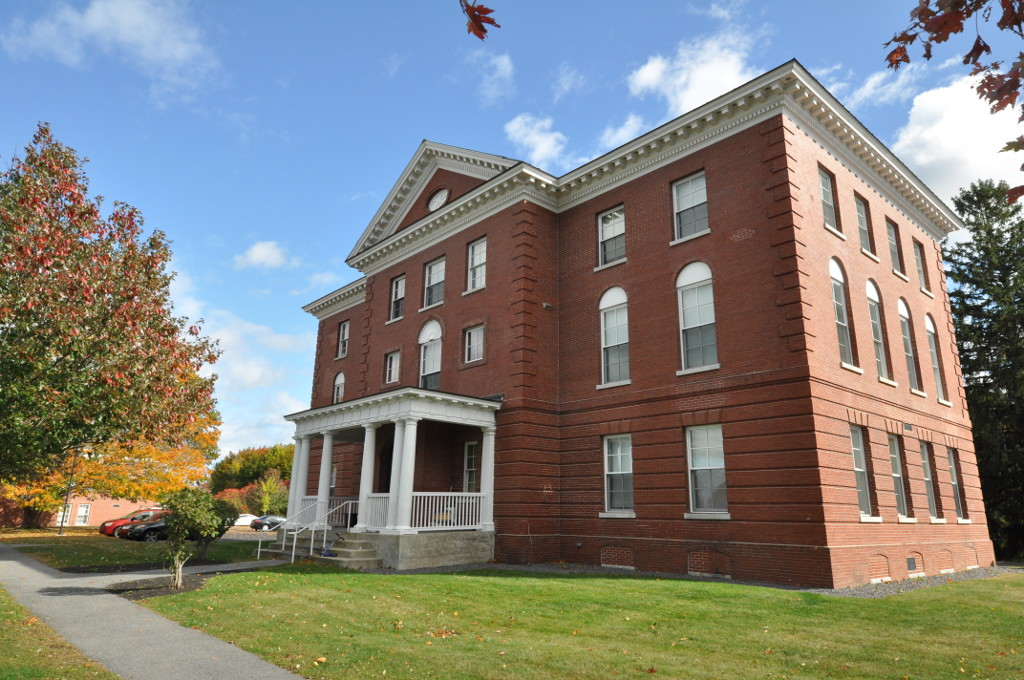
One of the residence halls

The former school is organized around Jordan Park, a small park bounded by Lydia Lane and Red Oak Drive. It is bounded on the south and east by Long Creek and Interstate 295, and on the north by Portland International Jetport. A residential subdivision stands to the west. The former administration building is a cruciform four-story structure with Tudor Revival styling. Four cottages, now apartment houses, line the park; all are Colonial Revival, either 2-1/2 or three stories in height, also of brick. The Gould School is a 1-1/2 story brick building with Classical Revival styling, including a temple-front entry pavilion supported by Tuscan columns.

== See also ==
- National Register of Historic Places listings in Cumberland County, Maine
