= Capitol Complex Historic District =

Historic district in Maine, United States

- U.S. National Register of Historic Places
- U.S. Historic district
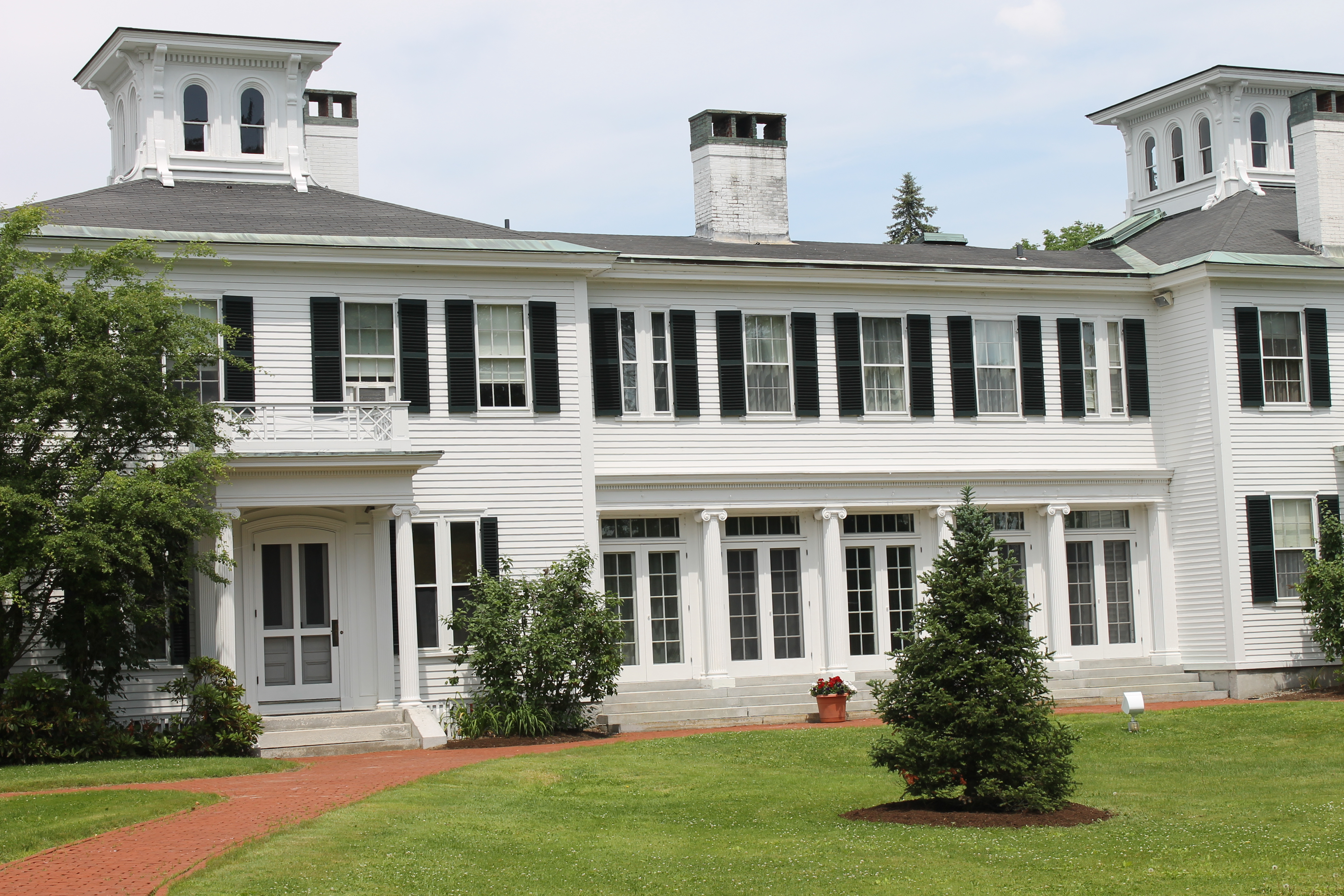
- The Blaine House

- Location within Maine Location within the United States
- Location: State and Capitol Sts., Augusta, Maine
- Coordinates: 44°18′24″N 69°46′49″W
- Area: 40 acres (16 ha)
- Built: 1827
- Architect: Bulfinch, Charles; Stevens, John Calvin
- Architectural style: Greek Revival, Late Victorian
- NRHP reference No.: 01001417
- Added to NRHP: December 31, 2001

The Capitol Complex Historic District encompasses the principal historic elements of Maine's state administration complex at Capitol and State Streets in Augusta, Maine. Included in the district are the Maine State House, Capitol Park, The Blaine House (the official governor's residence), the Burton Cross Office Building, and a number of state-owned 19th century residences in the vicinity of the Blaine House. The district was listed on the National Register of Historic Places in 2001.

== Description and history ==
The state of Maine's central administrative complex is located on the west side of Augusta, the capital city, south of its downtown area. State Street (United States Route 201) runs south from the downtown area, providing the main access to the area. On the west side of that road stands the Maine State House, its core structure and landscaping designed by Charles Bulfinch. West of the state house stands the Burton Cross Office building, a modern 1950s granite-faced structure. On the east side of the state house, across state street, is the 20-acre (8.1 ha) Capitol Park, part of the city's original land grant to the state for the capitol complex. It includes landscape features designed by the Olmsted Brothers landscape architectural firm.

North of the state house, across Capitol Street, is The Blaine House, a National Historic Landmark property that now serves as the official residence of the governor of Maine. Built in 1833 and enlarged in the 1860s and 1870s by James G. Blaine, the house was given to the state in 1919. It was redesigned for use as the official residence by John Calvin Stevens, and its grounds are also landscaped by the Olmsted Brothers.

Adjacent to, and across the street from, the Blaine mansion, are three houses that were purchased by the state in the 20th century to provide a buffer area around the mansion grounds. These properties include two Greek Revival houses built in the 1830s, and the 1911 Guy P. Gannett House, the only significant example of Mediterranean Revival architecture in Kennebec County. At the rear of the Burton Cross Office Building, across Sewall Street, stands the 1897 Romanesque Revival Nash School, which was purchased by the state in 1976.

== See also ==
- National Register of Historic Places listings in Kennebec County, Maine
