= Kennebec Arsenal =

- U.S. National Register of Historic Places
- U.S. National Historic Landmark District
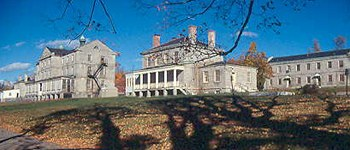
- Kennebec Arsenal

- Location within Maine Location within the United States
- Location: Augusta, Maine
- Coordinates: 44°18′30″N 69°46′10″W
- NRHP reference No.: 70000046

Significant dates
- Added to NRHP: August 25, 1970
- Designated NHLD: February 16, 2000

Kennebec Arsenal is a historic arsenal on Arsenal Street in Augusta, Maine. Largely developed between 1828 and 1838 in part because of border disputes with neighboring New Brunswick, it was designated a National Historic Landmark District in 2000 as a good example of a nearly intact early 19th-century munitions storage facility. The arsenal property was garrisoned until 1901, after which it was turned over to the State of Maine as an expansion of the adjacent Maine State Hospital. The state for many years housed mental health patients there.

== Development history ==
The events of the War of 1812 highlighted the needs of the United States to better defend its coast against potential foreign attacks, so the federal government embarked on a large-scale development of coastal and border fortifications. Maine in particular was singled out, having had some of its communities occupied during the war, along with an ongoing border dispute with neighboring New Brunswick over the northeastern border. Tensions surrounding that border area (now roughly Aroostook County, Maine and Madawaska County, New Brunswick) rose in the 1820s as both sides pressed for development of the area. As a result, the decision was made to build a major arsenal at Augusta. The site, on the east bank of the Kennebec River south of the central business district, was chosen in part for its ready access by boat. Plans were drafted in 1827 and construction began in 1828.

Built between 1828 and 1831 were commandant's and officer quarters, barracks, stables, a carriage shop, and the main armory. Most of the major structures were built out of granite. Between 1832 and 1838 the quarters were enlarged and given their present Greek Revival styling, and the large and small magazines were built, as was a munitions laboratory. A perimeter fence of granite and iron was also added, and the building known as the Office was built, in part from the demolished remains of a stable (which was rebuilt in wood).

The border dispute reached crisis proportions in 1838, with both Maine and New Brunswick organizing militia forces to send to the disputed area. The United States sent General Winfield Scott to the arsenal in Augusta, and he negotiated a stand-down of these forces with New Brunswick Lieutenant Governor John Harvey, who was a friend. The border was fixed at its present location by the 1842 Webster–Ashburton Treaty.

The arsenal thereafter declined in importance, seeing use for the manufacture of weapons for the Mexican–American War and the American Civil War. Because of its comparatively remote location, it was deemed unsuitable for the large-scale production of weapons, and only relative modest changes were made to it prior to its 1901 closure. The armory and carriage shop were both moved closer to the river bank, and a fire station was added to the property, as were several wood-frame buildings.

After the federal government closed the arsenal, the property was transferred to the state, which expanded the adjacent Maine State Hospital, a facility for the mentally ill, onto the property. The wood-frame structures were all torn down, as were the carriage shop and fire station, and the granite buildings were adapted for the hospital's use. These alterations did not make major alterations to the floor plan of most of the surviving buildings. The Maine State Hospital, later renamed the Augusta Mental Health Institute, closed it doors in 2004, and the arsenal property was sold to a developer, with historic preservation restrictions.

== Recent redevelopment ==
In 2006, the arsenal was slated for renovation, however no work on the landmark was done, and vandals broke windows and sprayed graffiti. The owner, Main Street I LLC, claimed that the poor economy hampered their efforts to renovate and maintain the property.

The Maine Attorney General's office notified the firm in a letter dated September 19, 2012 that it would sue for return of the property to the state if steps were not taken by October 1 to secure the property from vandals, thieves, and the weather. The AG's office later gave the firm a three-week delay after the firm's owner, Thomas Niemann, began to have discussions with them about the future of the property. Niemann requested a meeting with Maine Governor Paul LePage about the property, but the request was declined.

Despite further discussions, few if any steps were taken to protect the property, according to Department of Administrative and Financial Services Commissioner Sawin Millett. He claimed Niemann has failed to provide either a comprehensive plan to maintain the property or a performance bond to guarantee the financial ability to do so per the historical covenants on the property. As a result, the Attorney General's office filed a lawsuit in 2013, seeking return of the property to the State. The State claims that the lack of maintenance and protection of the property has resulted in over $1 million in damage. Niemann, through his attorney, claimed to be willing to work with the State to improve the arsenal site, and rejected the state's claims in court. An Augusta resident employed by Niemann stated that a $12,000 roof was installed on the gatehouse, and that electricity had been restored to at least some of the site, enabling security cameras to function.

By November 9, 2013, five of the six buildings on the site had new roofs or were in the process of getting them. Windows were sealed or temporarily boarded up, along with other work. Niemann also revealed some of his plans for the site, including renovating the gatehouse into offices for his firm, and renovating the barracks into two residential units and office space. State officials, while stating they were pleased with the repairs, said the lawsuit will continue. The state agreed to extend deadlines related to the suit as repairs were made, as well as to participate in supervised mediation sessions. Niemann's Augusta representative stated that the lawsuit was hampering progress with the site.

== See also ==
- List of National Historic Landmarks in Maine
- National Register of Historic Places listings in Kennebec County, Maine
