= 1850 Maine Insane Asylum fire =

Hospital fire in Maine, United States

Maine Insane Asylum fire
- Date: December 4, 1850 (175 years ago)
- Time: Around 3 AM
- Location: Maine Insane Asylum Augusta, Maine, U.S.; 44°18′07″N 69°46′11″W
- Deaths: 28

The Maine Insane Asylum fire occurred on December 4, 1850, at the Maine Insane Asylum in Augusta, Maine. One employee and 27 patients were killed, making it the deadliest fire in Maine's history.

== Fire ==
The fire started on the morning of December 4, 1850. At the time there were 124 patients in the institution (79 males and 45 females). The male patients were housed in the two south wings and the females resided in the north wing. There was no night watch, but a night attendant was asleep in each galley. The hospital opened in 1840 and in 1848, a new steam heating system, based on one used in McLean Hospital, was constructed and installed in the recently built men's wing by hospital superintendent Dr. James Bates. The steam came from a wood-fired furnace. A wooden air chamber fed wooden flues attached to the furnace, which moved hot air to the rooms above. In 1849, the system was also installed in the old south wing.

Around 3 am, fireman James P. Weeks noticed smoke coming from the hot air ducts in the hallways of the old south wing. When he went to the basement, he found the wooden air chamber and the floor joists on fire. Weeks attempted to put out the fire, but was unsuccessful. The smoke was also noticed by some of the patients, but asylum employees were accustomed to patients crying out in the night and paid no attention to them. After an alarm was sounded, all of the officers and attendants on the premises were summoned, but due to a lack of water and poor preparation, they found it impossible to fight the fire. Because the building was a mile away from the city, outside aid did not come quickly.

The building quickly filled with smoke and some of the halls were too smoky for attendants to enter and evacuate patients. The attendants unlocked as many doors as possible, but some patients refused to leave their rooms and even rushed back into the flames. One attendant, H. D. Jones, vowed to save as many patients as he could or die trying. He suffocated and died in the fire. He was the only employee killed in the blaze.

Ladders were placed on the side of the building and patients were able to climb down after the iron bars were ripped from the window. However, this was a slow process and the floors collapsed before all could escape. 27 patients died in the fire. The fire was slowed before it could reach the north wing and all of the female patients were evacuated.

== Cause ==
According to the hospital's annual report, the fire "originated in the hot-air chamber under the old south wing, probably from some defect in the arrangement of the smoke-pipe connected with the warming apparatus". The flues leading from the chamber spread smoke, gas, and heat throughout the building, which suffocated many of the patients.

== Aftermath ==
Temporary accommodations were found in the Augusta House hotel and in private residences. Some of the more violent patients were housed in the county jail until they could be placed with friends or otherwise cared for.

In 1851, Dr. Bates was sent by the governor to study institutions in other states to find ways the rebuilt asylum could be improved and resigned as the hospital's superintendent. He was succeeded by his assistant physician, H. M. Harlow. Harlow oversaw the reconstruction of the hospital and remained superintendent until 1883.

The eventually hospital changed its name to the Augusta Insane Asylum. It became the Augusta State Hospital in 1913 and the Augusta Mental Health Institute (AMHI) in 1973. AMHI closed in 2004 and was replaced by the Riverview Psychiatric Center.

== See also ==
- 1865 Augusta, Maine fire
- List of disasters in Maine by death toll
