= Maine State Prison =

Medium and maximum-security prison in Warren, Maine

Coordinates: 44°03′54″N 69°13′48″W

- Interactive map of Maine State Prison
- Location: Warren, Maine
- Status: Operational
- Security class: Close, Medium, & Special Management
- Capacity: 916
- Population: 820
- Opened: 2002
- Managed by: Maine Department of Corrections
- Warden: Matthew Magnusson

The Maine State Prison was erected in Thomaston, Maine in 1824 and relocated to Warren in 2002. This maximum-security prison has a capacity of 916 adult male inmates with an average daily population of 900.

== History ==
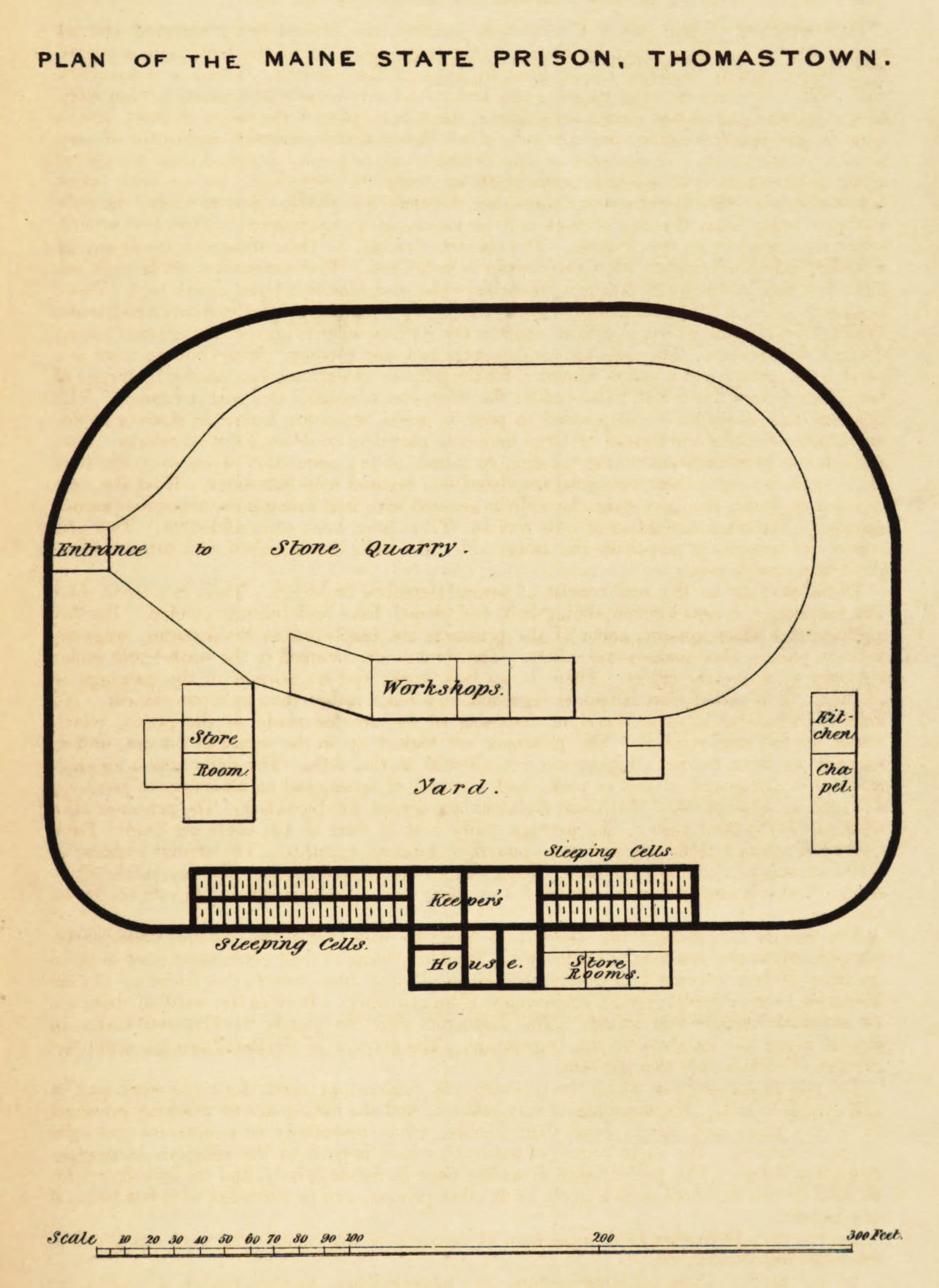
Layout of the prison in 1839

The state legislature established the Maine State Prison in Thomaston in 1824. The original layout of the prison kept prisoners housed in covered subterranean granite cells, nine feet 8 inches deep. The top opening of each cell measured four feet six inches by eight feet nine inches. Inmates entered their cells through a two-foot-square opening in the cell's cover, secured with an iron grate. In the prison's early years, the majority of prisoners died of tuberculosis before completing their sentences. Correctional officers at the prison had no formal training; they just observed senior officers. In 1978, the Maine Legislature passed a law requiring the Maine Criminal Justice Academy to establish training standards for correctional officers.

In 1923 the prison was destroyed by a fire in which many inmates died. The old prison was replaced by a facility with two cellblocks. The cells were modeled on the Auburn System. There were long narrow hallways with very small cells—7 ft × 6 ft (2.1 m × 1.8 m) each. The 1923 prison was very modern for the time and most things were performed by technology, like the locking and unlocking of doors.

The Maine State Prison had a farm several miles away where select prisoners worked. Most produce was used by the prison and not for sale. Other prisoners worked in carriage shops, harness shops, and in maintenance. In the summer of 1927 there were 197 white prisoners, three African American prisoners, and one prisoner of another race. The Maine state prison housed few females, who worked sewing and patching clothing. The women were relocated to the Women's Correctional Center in Skowhegan, Maine in 1935.

=== Move in 2002 ===
The old Maine State Prison in Thomaston was moved to a new, larger prison in Warren in February 2002 because of the growing prisoner population. Some residents in Thomaston objected to the relocation of the prison out of their town because it was a part of their history and local economy. Over 10,000 people gathered to tour the empty facility before it was torn down. The new prison was raised in the summer of 2002, and the site of the prison in Thomaston was converted into a field. There's a piece of the wall from the original prison still on the field as a historic sight and reminder.

== Incidents ==
- In 1998, Michael Chasse was arrested for breaking into the home of Robert Cohen, the brother of former Maine Senator William Cohen. As Chasse was being escorted to his trial for the break-in, he threw a white powdery substance into the guards’ faces and ran off, but was caught five hours later.
- On November 11, 2005, Portland Phoenix newspaper began an exposé series detailing the prison's alleged misuse of forcible extraction techniques and restraint chairs. Following a wave of public criticism, Corrections Commissioner Warren Magnusson promised to "de-escalate" use of the restraint chair, and asked the US Department of Justice's National Institute of Corrections to review the management of Maine Supermax.
- On June 30, 2008, Chasse, by then a prisoner of the Maine State Prison, took another prisoner and a staff member hostage. Chasse had what appeared to be a knife taped to his hand. After a seven-hour standoff, the two hostages were released with minor cuts. On November 3, 2011, Michael Chasse died while at the New Jersey State Prison, where he had been sent since Maine could no longer hold him in the prison due to his behavior.
- Gary Watland, a prisoner at the Maine State Prison serving a 25-year sentence for murder, devised a plan to have his wife, Susan Watland, bring a gun into the prison with the intent of taking hostages. Another prisoner alerted staff. On October 24, 2006, Susan Watland entered the prison with a loaded pistol but was apprehended by officials before any shots were fired. She was arrested and later sentenced to three years in prison with credit for time served, probation, and a fine. She has since been released. Gary Watland has since been transferred to the ADX Florence, a supermax penitentiary in Florence, Colorado.

== Special Management Unit ==
The Special Management Unit (SMU) is a restrictive housing unit that has two pods. One pod houses the ACU, or Administrative Control Unit, which houses residents who are threats to themselves or others, are escape risks, or violate institutional rules, such as fighting, having weapons or other contraband, or seriously assaulting other residents or staff. Most residents in the ACU are on 21-hour lockdown. They receive two hours a day of exercise in a recreation yard, and most services, such as meals and medication, are brought to them in their cells. They also receive programming to allow them to earn their way back into general population. The ACU has a level system that is based on behavior and programming and allows the resident to earn privileges. The second pod houses the residents who are on DSeg time and are awaiting admission to the ACU or could not be housed in general population on DSeg time due to their violent behavior.

== Prison management ==
Currently, the Maine State Prison has a capacity of 1,064 and uses the team management system. A team of staff for each housing unit meets periodically to talk about the needs of each prisoner, determine their custody level, and set goals for each prisoner to reach. Education programs are available to inmates, including GED prep, typing, English, horticulture, science, and college prep math. College courses are also available for prisoners; they can work towards any degree level. Prisoners placed in the SMU have access to educational, mental health, and other programs in-cell.The average return to custody rate one year post-release is 8.5%; for those in the college program, it's 0.05%.

The Maine State Prison allows prisoners with a sentence of five years or less to live in the Bolduc Correctional Facility in Warren, Maine, down the road from the prison. Here, they are offered many different vocational and educational programs for rehabilitation to prepare for release.

== See also ==
- Maine Department of Corrections
