= List of law enforcement agencies in Maine =

This is a list of law enforcement agencies in the state of Maine.

According to the US Bureau of Justice Statistics' 2008 Census of State and Local Law Enforcement Agencies, the state had 146 law enforcement agencies employing 2,569 sworn police officers, about 195 for each 100,000 residents.

== State agencies ==
- Maine Department of Corrections
- Maine Department of Inland Fisheries and Wildlife
  - Maine Warden Service
- Maine Department of Marine Resources
  - Maine Marine Patrol
- Maine Department of Public Safety
  - Maine Bureau of Capitol Police
  - Maine Drug Enforcement Agency
  - Maine State Fire Marshal's Office
  - Maine State Police
- Maine Department of Agriculture, Conservation and Forestry
  - Maine Forest Service
- Maine Department of the Secretary of State
  - Bureau of Motor Vehicles
    - Division of Enforcement, Anti-Theft and Regulations
- State of Maine Judicial Branch
  - Office of Judicial Marshals
- Office of the Maine Attorney General
  - Investigation Division

== County agencies ==
- Androscoggin County Sheriff's Office
- Aroostook County Sheriff's Office
- Cumberland County Sheriff's Office
- Franklin County Sheriff's Office
- Hancock County Sheriff's Office
- Kennebec County Sheriff's Office
- Knox County Sheriff's Office
- Lincoln County Sheriff's Office
- Oxford County Sheriff's Office
- Penobscot County Sheriff's Office
- Piscataquis County Sheriff's Office
- Sagadahoc County Sheriff's Office
- Somerset County Sheriff's Office
- Waldo County Sheriff's Office
- Washington County Sheriff's Office
- York County Sheriff's Office

== Municipal agencies ==
- Androscoggin County
  - Auburn Police Department
  - Lewiston Police Department
  - Lisbon Police Department
  - Livermore Falls Police Department
  - Mechanic Falls Police Department
  - Sabattus Police Department
- Aroostook County
  - Ashland Police Department
  - Caribou Police Department
  - Fort Fairfield Police Department
  - Fort Kent Police Department
  - Houlton Police Department
  - Madawaska Police Department
  - Presque Isle Police Department
  - Washburn Police Department
- Cumberland County
  - Bridgton Police Department
  - Brunswick Police Department
  - Cape Elizabeth Police Department
  - Cumberland Police Department
  - Falmouth Police Department
  - Freeport Police Department
  - Gorham Police Department
  - Portland Police Department
  - Scarborough Police Department
  - South Portland Police Department
  - Westbrook Police Department
  - Windham Police Department
  - Yarmouth Police Department
- Franklin County
  - Carrabassett Valley Police Department
  - Farmington Police Department
  - Jay Police Department
  - Rangeley Police Department
  - Wilton Police Department
- Hancock County
  - Bar Harbor Police Department
  - Bucksport Police Department
  - Ellsworth Police Department
  - Gouldsboro Police Department
  - Mount Desert Police Department
  - Southwest Harbor Police Department
  - Winter Harbor Police Department
- Kennebec County
  - Augusta Police Department
  - Clinton Police Department
  - Gardiner Police Department
  - Hallowell Police Department
  - Monmouth Police Department
  - Oakland Police Department
  - Waterville Police Department
  - Winslow Police Department
  - Winthrop Police Department
- Knox County
  - Camden Police Department
  - Rockland Police Department
  - Rockport Police Department
  - Thomaston Police Department
- Lincoln County
  - Boothbay Harbor Police Department
  - Damariscotta Police Department
  - Waldoboro Police Department
  - Wiscasset Police Department
- Oxford County
  - Fryeburg Police Department
  - Mexico Police Department
  - Norway Police Department
  - Oxford Police Department
  - Paris Police Department
  - Rumford Police Department
- Penobscot County
  - Bangor Police Department
  - Brewer Police Department
  - Dexter Police Department
  - East Millinocket Police Department
  - Hampden Police Department
  - Holden Police Department
  - Lincoln Police Department
  - Newport Police Department
  - Old Town Police Department
  - Orono Police Department
  - Veazie Police Department
- Piscataquis County
  - Dover-Foxcroft Police Department
  - Greenville Police Department
  - Milo Police Department
- Sagadahoc County
  - Bath Police Department
  - Phippsburg Police Department
  - Richmond Police Department
  - Topsham Police Department
- Somerset County
  - Fairfield Police Department
  - Pittsfield Police Department
  - Skowhegan Police Department
- Waldo County
  - Belfast Police Department
  - Islesboro Law Enforcement Department
  - Searsport Police Department
  - Stockton Springs Police Department
- Washington County
  - Baileyville Police Department
  - Calais Police Department
  - Eastport Police Department
  - Machias Police Department
  - Milbridge Police Department
- York County
  - Berwick Police Department
  - Biddeford Police Department
  - Buxton Police Department
  - Eliot Police Department
  - Kennebunk Police Department
  - Kennebunkport Police Department
  - Kittery Police Department
  - North Berwick Police Department
  - Ogunquit Police Department
  - Old Orchard Beach Police Department
  - Saco Police Department
  - Sanford Police Department
  - South Berwick Police Department
  - Wells Police Department
  - York Police Department

== Tribal Police ==
- Indian Township Police Department
- Passamaquoddy Warden Service
- Penobscot Nation Police Department
- Penobscot Nation Warden Service
- Pleasant Point Police Department

== Railroad Police ==
- Boston and Maine Railroad Police Department
- Canadian Pacific Police Service

== Campus Police ==
- University of Maine Police Department
- University of Southern Maine Police Department
- University of Maine at Farmington Police Department

== Other ==
- Baxter State Park Authority Park Rangers
- Two Bridges Regional Jail

== Disbanded agency ==
- Limestone Police Department
