= Maine State Police =

State police agency

- Patch of Maine State Police
- Abbreviation: MSP
- Motto: Semper Aequus; Always Just

Agency overview
- Formed: 1921; 105 years ago
- Preceding agency: State Highway Police
- Employees: 458 (as of 2016)

Jurisdictional structure
- Operations jurisdiction: Maine, USA
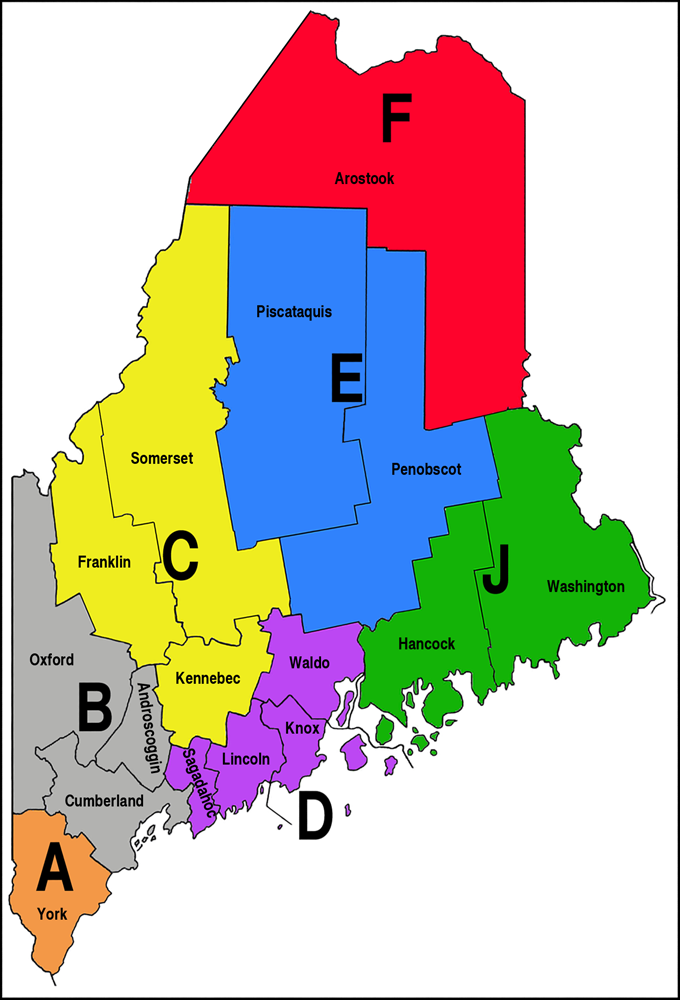
- Maine State Police Troops
- Area: 33,414 square miles (86,540 km^{2})
- Population: 1,317,207 (2007 est.)
- General nature: Civilian police

Operational structure
- Headquarters: Augusta, Maine
- Troopers: 330 (as of 2021)
- Civilians: 117 (as of 2014)
- Agency executives: Colonel Bill G. Ross; Lt. Colonel Brian Scott; Major Lucas Hare; Major Scott Gosselin

Facilities
- Troops: 10

Website
- http://www.state.me.us/dps/msp/

The Maine State Police (MSP) is the state police agency for Maine, which has jurisdiction across the state and was created in 1921.

== Training programs ==
Maine State Troopers go through an 18-week Basic Law Enforcement training period at the Maine Criminal Justice Academy in Vassalboro. The entrance standards to the Academy are some of the toughest in the United States. Training includes many hours of learning in courses such as firearms, Constitutional law, patrol procedures, criminal behavior, high-speed pursuit and various other criminal justice and social science courses. . After graduation from the MCJA, Trooper recruits are required to attend another 10 weeks of training in the Recruit Training Troop (RTT). The RTT is even more rigorous than the 18-week Basic Law Enforcement academy.

As Troopers progress in their careers, they are able to join other specialized units, such as the Tactical Team or K9 Unit. These added units require many extra hours of training. Many State Troopers are involved in two to three extra units, depending upon where they are located.

== Organization ==
=== Chief of State Police ===
On Monday April 11, 2011, Governor Paul LePage nominated Lieutenant Colonel Robert Williams to be the new police chief.

In May 2011, Robert Williams was named Colonel of the Maine State Police.

In March 2018, Colonel Robert Williams announced his retirement from the Maine State Police, stating that he had accepted a position with Colby College as their Director of Security. Governor LePage nominated Lieutenant Colonel John Cote to be the next State Police Chief.

In December 2022, Governor Janet Mills nominated Major William Ross to be the next Chief of the Maine State Police.

=== Top salaries ===
In 2023, two Maine State Police Officers were listed on Maine’s top salary list. Sergeant Jonathan Leach earned $212,685.22 and Sergeant Kristopher Kennedy earned $201,119.60.

=== Field Troops ===
Maine State Police Troops
Northern Field Troop	Troops E & J
Central Field Troop	Troops C & D
Southern Field Troop	Troops A & B

Maine State Troopers patrol from ten barracks located across the state. These barracks are:

- Troop A - Alfred - York County
- Troop B - Gray - Southern Maine
- Troop C - Skowhegan - Western Maine
- Troop D - Augusta - Midcoast Maine
- Troop E - Bangor - Central Maine
- Troop F - Houlton - Northern Maine
- Troop G - Portland - Maine Turnpike
- Troop I - Maine Interstate System
- Troop J - Ellsworth - Downeast Maine
- Troop K - Augusta - Commercial Vehicle Enforcement Unit

In late 2022, the Maine State Police announced that it would be restructuring its field troops. Troops A and B combined to form the Southern Field Troop, Troops C and D formed the Central Field Troop, and Troops E and J formed the Northern Field Troop. Additionally, Troop I was established to patrol all of I-295 from Scarborough to West Gardiner and I-95 from Augusta to the Aroostook County line. This includes I-395.

=== Specialized units ===
Specialty Units fall under the Special Services Division, these units are composed of specially selected and trained members of the Maine State Police. Deployments occur statewide and may be requested at anytime by a law enforcement agency.

==== Air Wing ====
The Maine State Police Air Wing was established in the 1970s. Today, the air wing consists of two Cessna 182 fixed wing aircraft. The aircraft are strategically stationed for regional response to mission requests. Both aircraft and pilots are certified for IFR (instrument flight rules) flight.

The State Police Air Wing is often utilized for traffic enforcement along the interstate from Kittery to Houlton, and aerial photos of traffic crash and crime scenes. The aircraft are used to conduct searches for lost or wanted persons. They also serve as an aerial platform to support the Maine State Police Tactical and Canine Teams, and conduct administrative transports throughout New England.

The Maine State Police are responsible for air search and rescue efforts. In this role, air wing personnel assist incident commanders in coordinating search efforts for lost or overdue aircraft reported within the state.

==== Bombs/Explosives Unit ====
The bomb team has been active since 1994 and is made up of five bomb technicians who have been specially trained. The team is responsible for investigating actual or suspected explosive devices. Utilizing federal funding, the team obtained a containment trailer for explosives and a remote control robot, which is used to examine suspicious packages.

==== K9 Unit ====
The Maine State Police Canine Unit is composed of twenty certified teams. The unit is split into two separate but interrelated functions: operational and training. A sergeant and one full-time trooper staff the unit. The K-9 Training Center is located adjacent to the Maine Criminal Justice Academy, in Vassalboro, Maine. At this location we are able to provide over 200 acres (0.81 km^{2}) of available land for training, a canine agility/confidence course, a 1,300 sq ft (120 m^{2}) classroom / office building, and a 7,800 sq ft (720 m^{2}).training building. From this location we are able to provide support for our operational missions, both in terms of logistical support and equipment needs.

Calls for service include tracking lost persons or persons suspected of committing a crime. Searching for discarded evidence, both known and unknown. Searching for suspects concealed in buildings. Locating prohibited narcotics hidden in vehicles, structures and on persons. Searching for explosives. Explosive searches are split between actual calls for suspected devices and precautionary searches for dignitaries and VIP's. Patrol dogs also provide protection for their handlers and deterring ongoing criminal behavior.

==== Crisis Negotiations Unit ====
This specially trained group of thirteen negotiators responds to life-threatening incidents such as suicidal threats, barricaded persons and hostage takers. Their goal is to open a line of communication aimed at resolving the situation in a nonviolent manner. The team works in conjunction with the tactical team and responds to most of their calls.

==== Underwater Recovery Team ====
The dive team consists of ten members, eight from State Police and two divers from the Maine Marine Patrol. The team conducts searches for evidence in criminal investigations. They also conduct underwater crime scene documentation and investigation. The team also conducts search and recovery operations for victims of motor vehicle crashes, homicide, and other water related deaths. The team is often called upon to search vessels and harbors in Maine as part of Homeland Security.

==== Evidence Response Team ====
The Evidence Response Team examines major scenes to identify and establish the interrelationships of physical evidence involved in the scene. This process involves developing, identifying, documenting, collecting, and preserving evidence for purposes of identifying suspects and establishing sequence of events possibilities.

The ERT is composed of 29 sworn members who are all IAI certified Scene Technicians and Analysts. These members may have individual forensic specialties but are all generalists that maintain a good working knowledge of the various disciplines of forensic science.

There are 20 additional ERT Associate Members that represent an expertise in a broad spectrum of forensic disciplines (i.e. pathology, trace, biology, prints, ballistics, anthropology, etc.) and act as consultants who train regularly with the team.

==== Executive Protection ====
The Executive Protection Unit is assigned to protect the Governor of Maine, the Governor's family, and anyone else as designated by the Governor or the Department. Members of the EPU are trained in personal protection, physical security, and threat assessment. The EPU works closely with other state, local, and federal agencies to provide protection for the Governor and other visiting dignitaries.

==== Incident Management ====
The Incident Management Team (IMAT) provides operational and logistical support for large and complex incidents that require coordination with local, other state and federal agencies such as manhunts and mass casualty events. The team also operates a mobile command post equipped with advanced electronics and communications systems, as well as a full command and control area, allowing it to operate as a self-sufficient command post. The team is led by a commander and 3 assistant team commanders.

==== Honor Guard ====
The Maine State Police Honor Guard is a dedicated unit of 16 troopers that was established in 2016. The troopers in the Honor Guard functions as ambassadors for the Department and the State of Maine, they receive specialized training to ensure that fallen officers will receive the proper honor and respect for their service and dedication. The team’s paramount mission is to pay tribute to those Troopers, Deputies, and Officers who have lost their lives in the line of duty, and to those who have passed on following distinguished careers in law enforcement. Troopers assigned to the honor guard unit additionally perform ceremonial duties at State Government functions, memorials, parades, and other functions that may require the “posting” of National and State Colors with the highest level of professionalism.

==== Criminal Investigations and Forensics ====
The Maine State Police maintains a full service nationally accredited crime laboratory. There are three divisions of criminal investigators, a polygraph unit, a computer crimes unit and intelligence unit. The Maine State Police also play a key role in the homeland security issues in Maine. The Maine State Police/State Bureau of Identification maintains all criminal records and statistics in the State as well as the Sex Offender Registry.

==== Motor vehicle inspection program ====
Maine requires all motor vehicles to undergo a safety inspection once a year. Vehicles registered in Cumberland County are also required to undergo an emissions test. Inspections are conducted at automobile dealerships, service stations and garages. To insure inspection mechanics are complying with the state's many safety provisions, motor vehicle inspectors conduct periodic reviews of their practices and facilities, and investigate complaints. In addition, state police personnel inspect Maine's school bus fleet at least once per year. This is in addition to the two regular annual inspections required of school buses. There are about 8,000 active licensed inspection mechanics and 2,700 inspection stations. One motor vehicle inspector, eight motor vehicle inspectors, and two clerks currently staff the program.

==== Motor Vehicle Crash Investigation Program ====
The State of Maine Crash Reconstruction Unit is composed of State Police, Municipal and County Law Enforcement personnel. Currently the unit includes 20 troopers, 15 county and 37 municipal officers. Unit members are located throughout the entire state and are chosen based on both geographic location and ability.

The objective of the Crash Reconstruction Unit is to conduct in-depth investigations and analyses of major traffic collisions throughout the state. Investigations include the reconstruction of a crash and a study of the factors that may have contributed to that crash. These factors include environmental, human and mechanical and are associated with the three phases of a collision, which are pre-crash, at-crash and post-crash. The ultimate objective of the program is the utilization of these identified causation factors to prevent collisions of a similar nature from recurring.

Unit members are trained in the physics of collision analysis and reconstruction, occupant kinematics (human factor analysis), vehicle dynamics (collision damage analysis), scene photography, the use of various measuring instruments and computer-aided design software.

==== Division of Weapons and Professional Licensing ====
The Maine State Police is responsible for issuing concealed handgun permits in the state, as well as issuing permits to out-of-state residents. Each year they process around 4,000 applications, the state police issues permits for residents of rural areas, residents of city/towns are issued permits by that city/town's police department. Although on October 15, 2015, Public Law 2015, Chapter 327 (LD 652) went into effect, which allows persons over the age of 21, who are not prohibited from possessing a firearm, to carry a concealed handgun without a permit in most areas. This law also authorizes a person to possess a loaded pistol or revolver while in a motor vehicle, trailer or other vehicle being hauled by a motor vehicle. Though there are certain places in the state where it is illegal to carry a concealed handgun without a permit, such as: Acadia National Park, Maine State Parks, archery-only hunting, employee vehicles on work premises and on private property & businesses with no weapons signs.

==== Tactical Team ====
The Maine State Police Tactical Team was formed in 1982. The unit consisted of a handful of State Troopers armed with limited equipment and provided support to law enforcement agencies throughout the State of Maine.

Presently, the Tactical Team consists of 23 members, counting the Team Leaders. These Troopers, Detectives and Sergeants have primary responsibilities in a Troop or other unit within the Maine State Police agency. The Tactical Team is a secondary function, which defines the unit as a collateral duty Team. The current Team has 19 Tactical operators, two Tactical K9 units and two Tactical Medics. The members are geographically located throughout the state, providing assistance/support to requesting law enforcement agencies, including the State Police. Each member on the Team is cross-trained with all equipment.

The Tactical Team works in conjunction with the Maine State Police Crisis Negotiation Team to peacefully resolve critical incidents, which include barricaded subjects, wanted felons, high-risk K-9 tracks, hostage situations and high-risk warrant services. Over the past few years, the Tactical Team has responded to approximately 50 calls for service per year.

In addition, the Tactical Team instructs students at the Maine Criminal Justice Academy, provides support to Federal agencies for Homeland Security issues and works in conjunction with other local, state and county law enforcement agencies.

== Equipment ==
=== Vehicles ===
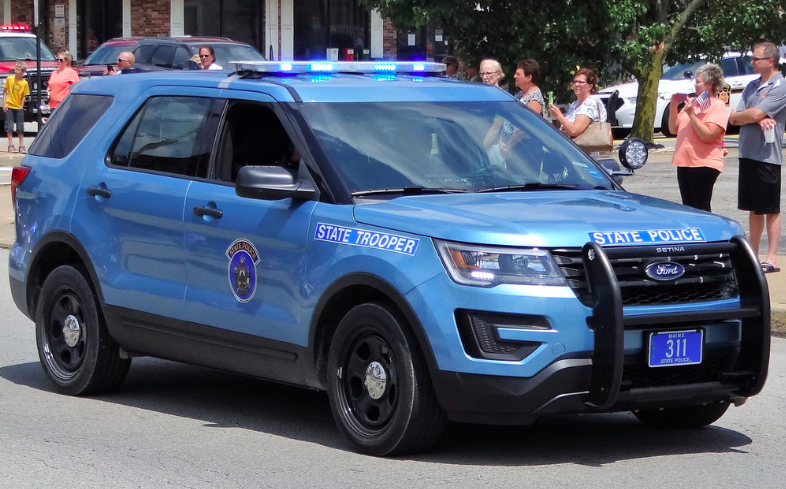

The Maine State police uses:

- Ford Police Interceptor Sedan and in both marked and unmarked versions. The marked versions are a dark sky blue. Unmarked cars are a variety of colors.
- Ford Police Interceptor Utility typically marked. Most sergeants have MSP blue cruisers with no decals. Some MSP Interceptor Utilities are unmarked and in various colors, some with civilian rims and license plates.
- Chevrolet Tahoe and Chevrolet Suburban Usually marked in non-traditional colors (silver, dark gray or dark blue), but do come unmarked. Used for commercial vehicle enforcement and accident reconstruction.

From 2005 through 2015, all cars were slicktops with only interior-mounted emergency lighting. Following a motor vehicle accident in July 2015 involving a Maine State Police cruiser and a tractor trailer, the State Police shifted away from their slicktop-only fleet to using Whelen Legacy light bars. Also, new reflective fender/hood/trunk graphics with rear bumper chevrons and rear pillar reflective stripes were added to all new cars.

While most marked units have blue license plates, many detective and unmarked units have regular civilian license plates.

Following the end of Ford Crown Victoria Police Interceptor production, the MSP recently announced that it has "all but finally settled" on the new Ford Taurus-based Interceptor. As production ends on the Taurus, the Police Interceptor Utility has become the main vehicle purchased.

=== Weapons ===
Troopers are issued the Heckler & Koch HK45 LEM .45 Auto semi automatic pistol. Detectives are authorized to use the HK 45 C LEM. Prior to the HK45 troopers were issued the Heckler & Koch USP .45 and the USP .45 Compact. Previously Troopers were issued the Beretta 92F and 92F Centurion, Smith & Wesson Model 28 and Smith & Wesson Model 13 .357 Magnum revolvers. Troopers are also armed with the Bushmaster XM-15, detectives are issued the Ruger PC-9, and the Springfield M14 is also issued.

== Fallen officers ==
Since the establishment of the Maine State Police, 12 officers and 1 K9 have died while on duty.

Rank	Name	Date of death	Cause of Death	Age	Location
Patrolman	Emery O. Gooch	08-09-1924	Killed in a motorcycle wreck	29	On Sunken Bridge Hill in Mattawamkeag, Maine
Patrolman	Fred A. Foster	09-30-1925	Killed while on his motorcycle after striking a horse and wagon hauling hay	27	Belfast, Maine
Trooper	Frank C. Wing	08-19-1928	Killed while on his motorcycle after colliding with a fuel truck	26	Millinocket, Maine
Trooper	Charles Clinton Black	07-09-1964	Shot and killed after arriving on scene to a bank robbery in progress	28	South Berwick, Maine
Trooper	Thomas J. Merry	07-12-1980	Killed after being hit by a fleeing vehicle as he attempted to set up a roadblock for the pursuit	28	On U.S. Route 2 in Palmyra, Maine
Trooper	Michael R. Veilleux	06-17-1986	Killed in a car crash	24	Dayton, Maine
Detective	Giles R. Landry	03-31-1989	Shot and killed after responding to a domestic dispute/child abuse case	36	Leeds, Maine
Lieutenant	Rene Albert Goupil	01-23-1990	Died from a heart attack after finishing a mandatory 2-mile run	43	Waterville, Maine
Trooper	Jeffrey Parola	11-13-1994	Killed after losing control of his car in a sharp turn while responding to a domestic violence call	27	Sidney, Maine
Trooper	James A. "Drew" Griffith	04-15-1996	Killed in a car crash after being hit by an ice truck while making a U-turn	34	On U.S. Route 1 in Warren, Maine
Detective	Glenn Strange	10-17-1997	Died from a heart attack due to having suffered a serious blow to the chest during a fight with a suspect several days earlier	46	Houlton, Maine
Detective	Ben Campbell	04-03-2019	Killed when a tire separated from a semi-truck and struck him on I-95 South	31	Hampden, Maine
K9	Preacher	02-04-2025	Shot and killed by suspect during pursuit after responding to domestic abuse call	4	Portage Lake, Maine

== Rank structure ==
Title	Insignia
Colonel	
Lieutenant Colonel	
Major	
Lieutenant	
Sergeant	
Corporal	
Trooper	

== See also ==
- Highway patrol
- State police
- List of law enforcement agencies in Maine
