= Long Creek Youth Development Center =

Correctional facility in South Portland, Maine, U.S.

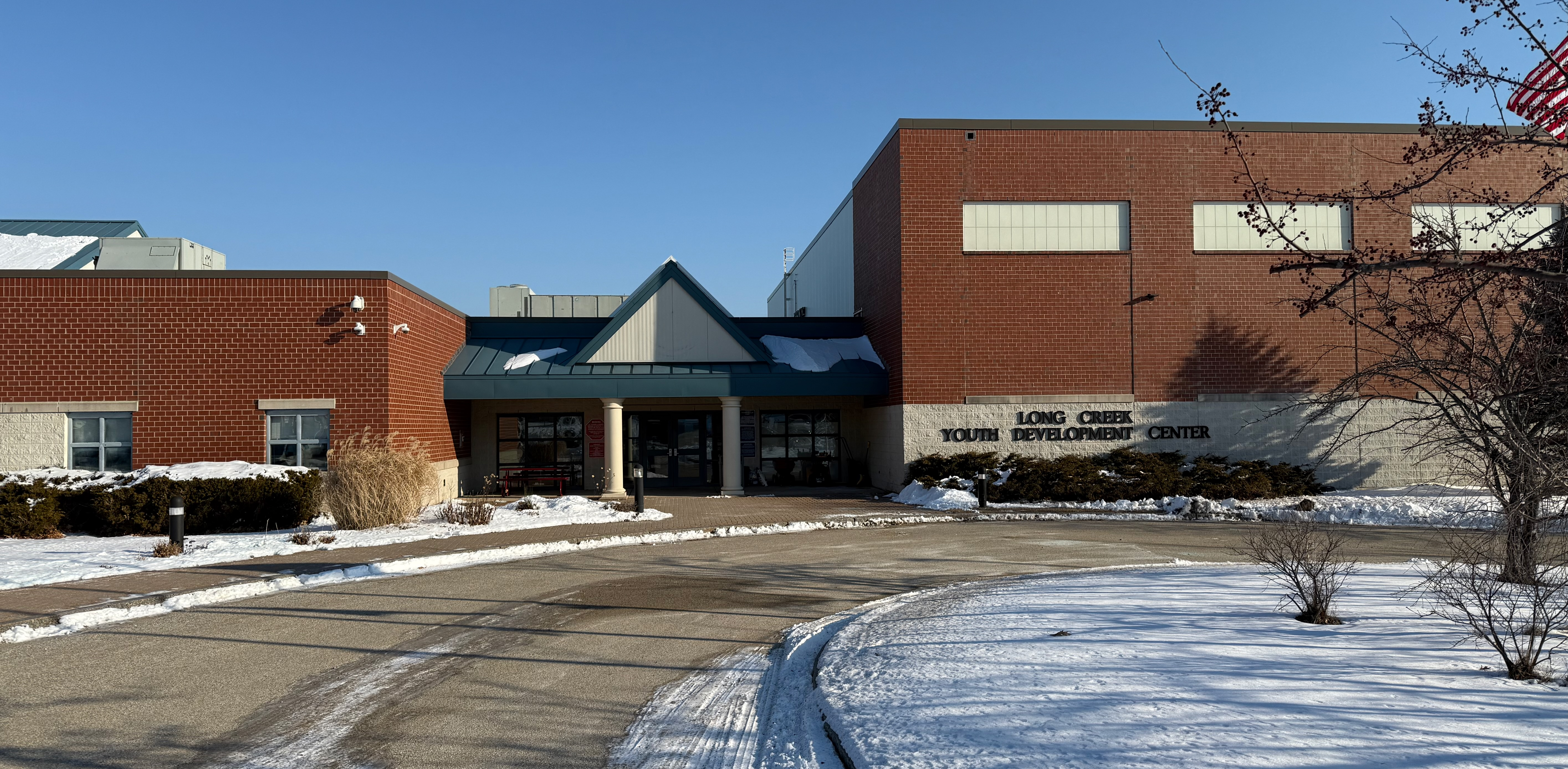
- Main entrance, pictured in 2025
- Interactive map of Long Creek Youth Development Center
- Location: South Portland, Maine; 43.639425°N 70.309161°W
- Status: Open
- Opened: 1853 (173 years ago)
- Former name: State Reform School (1853–1903); State School for Boys (1903–1959); Boys Training Center (1959–1976); Maine Youth Center (1976–2001)
- Managed by: Maine Department of Corrections

Long Creek Youth Development Center (LCYDC) is Maine's only secure juvenile facility. Established by the Maine Legislature in 1853 as the Maine State Reform School for Boys, it is both a detention center and a correctional facility, run by the Maine Department of Corrections. Located on Westbrook Street in South Portland, adjacent to Portland International Jetport, it is named for the Long Creek tributary of the Fore River on which it stands. The school was built in 1853, to a design by Boston architect Gridley James Fox Bryant, who had a specialization in prison design. The Arthur R. Gould School, which is attended by its inmates, was added in 1921.

The State Reform School was renamed the State School for Boys in 1903, then the Boys Training Center in 1959. After the girls' reformatory school, the Stevens School, was closed in 1976, its inmates were transferred to the Boys Training Center, at which point it was renamed the Maine Youth Center. It was given its current name in 2001.

The facility received Accreditation Status in 2006.

Severe staffing shortages were reported in 2022.

The campus is part of the State Reform School Historic District.
