= Clark Pond (Maine) =

Large pond in Maine, United States

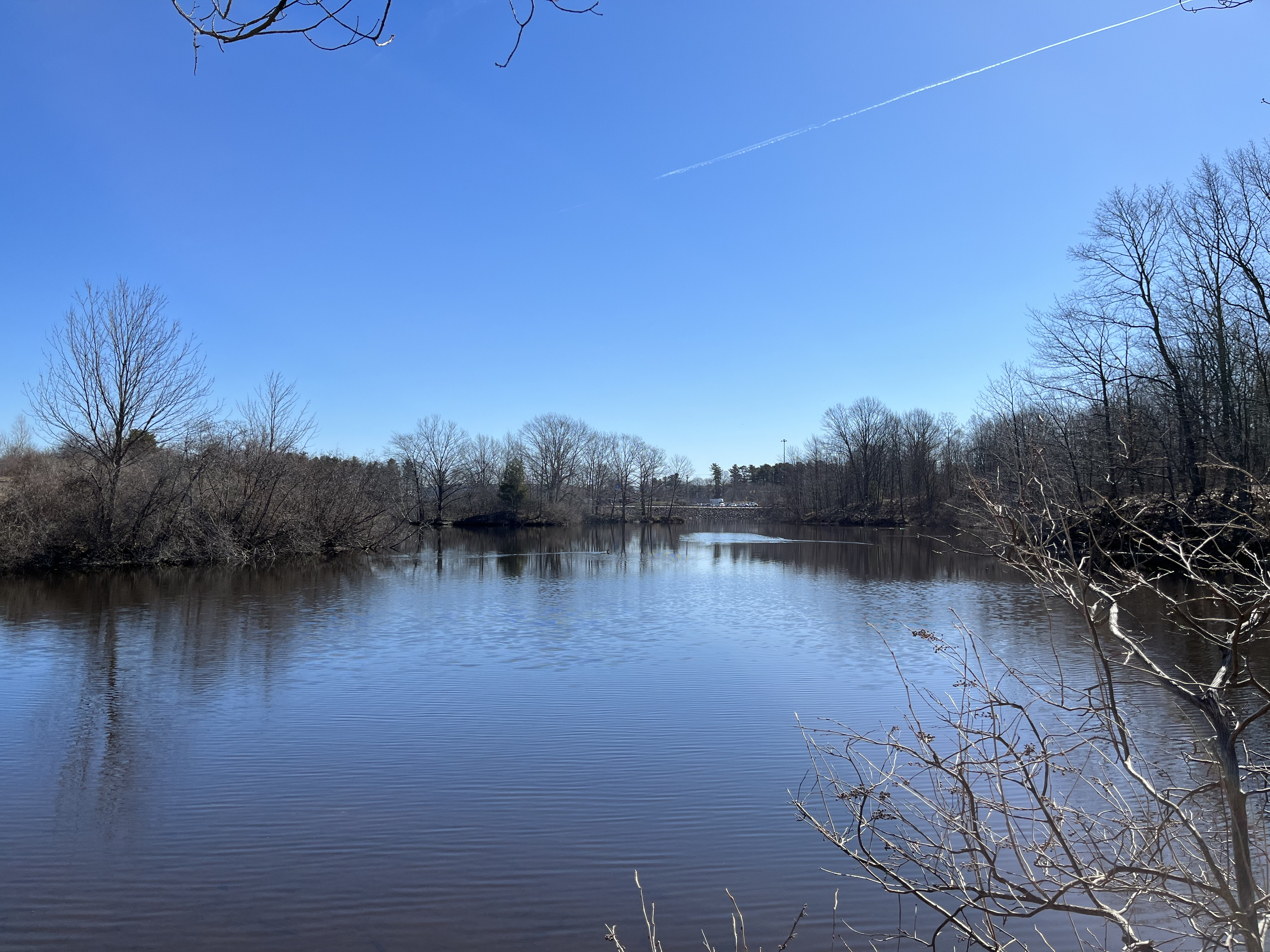
- Looking east toward the pond's island

- Location within Maine Location within the United States
- Location: South Portland, Maine, U.S.
- Coordinates: 43.63244119°N 70.314940°W
- Type: Pond
- Primary inflows: Long Creek
- Primary outflows: Long Creek
- Basin countries: United States
- Surface area: 15 acres (6.1 ha)
- Max. depth: 16 feet (4.9 m)

Clark Pond is a freshwater pond in South Portland, Maine, United States. Located near The Maine Mall, it has given its name to Clarks (sic) Pond Parkway, which connects Gorham Road in the north to John Roberts Road in the south, and to the Clarks Pond shopping plaza.

The pond, which contains a small island, is fed by Long Creek from the west. It empties out, on the pond's eastern side, eventually leading to the Fore River, about a mile to the northeast. Westbrook Street crosses Long Creek as it leaves Clark Pond to the east.

The pond was historically used for recreational activities, as well as ice-production between the 1930s and 1950s.

== Wildlife and conservation ==
A survey of the pond took place in 1958, with a revision occurring forty years later. The following fish were found to have their habitat there:

- Chain pickerel
- Minnows
- Golden shiner
- White sucker
- Hornpout (bullhead)
- Banded killifish
- Three-spined stickleback
- Ninespine stickleback
- Pumpkinseed sunfish
- American eel

Due to heavy development in the area from the late 1960s, including the construction of the mall, the pond's watershed suffered major environmental damage, including erosion, sedimentation, the input of phosphorus and pollution, runoff from nearby roads, and the disposal of garbage. Repairs and mitigation took place in the mid-1980s.

== Recreation ==
The Clark's Pond Trail, originally a 1.1 miles (1.8 km)-long path, followed the western and southern shores of the pond. After a fifteen-year process, the trail was extended by a mile in 2022, allowing pedestrians to walk around the pond's entire periphery.

The trail has two access points: in the Home Depot parking lot and on the western side of Westbrook Street, opposite the I-295 southbound off-ramp at exit 3.

It is maintained by the South Portland Land Trust, part of the Maine Land Trust Network.
