= 1865 Augusta, Maine fire =

Conflagration in Maine, United States

Coordinates: 44.3163°N 69.7738°W

The 1865 Augusta, Maine fire occurred on September 17, 1865, in Augusta, Maine, United States. The downtown district of Augusta, which had been the state of Maine's capital city since 1827, saw approximately 100 buildings destroyed. The 150th anniversary of the fire was commemorated in September 2015.

== See also ==
- 1850 Maine Insane Asylum fire
- 1866 great fire of Portland, Maine
