= Augusta Mental Health Institute =

- Maine Insane Hospital
- U.S. National Register of Historic Places
- U.S. Historic district
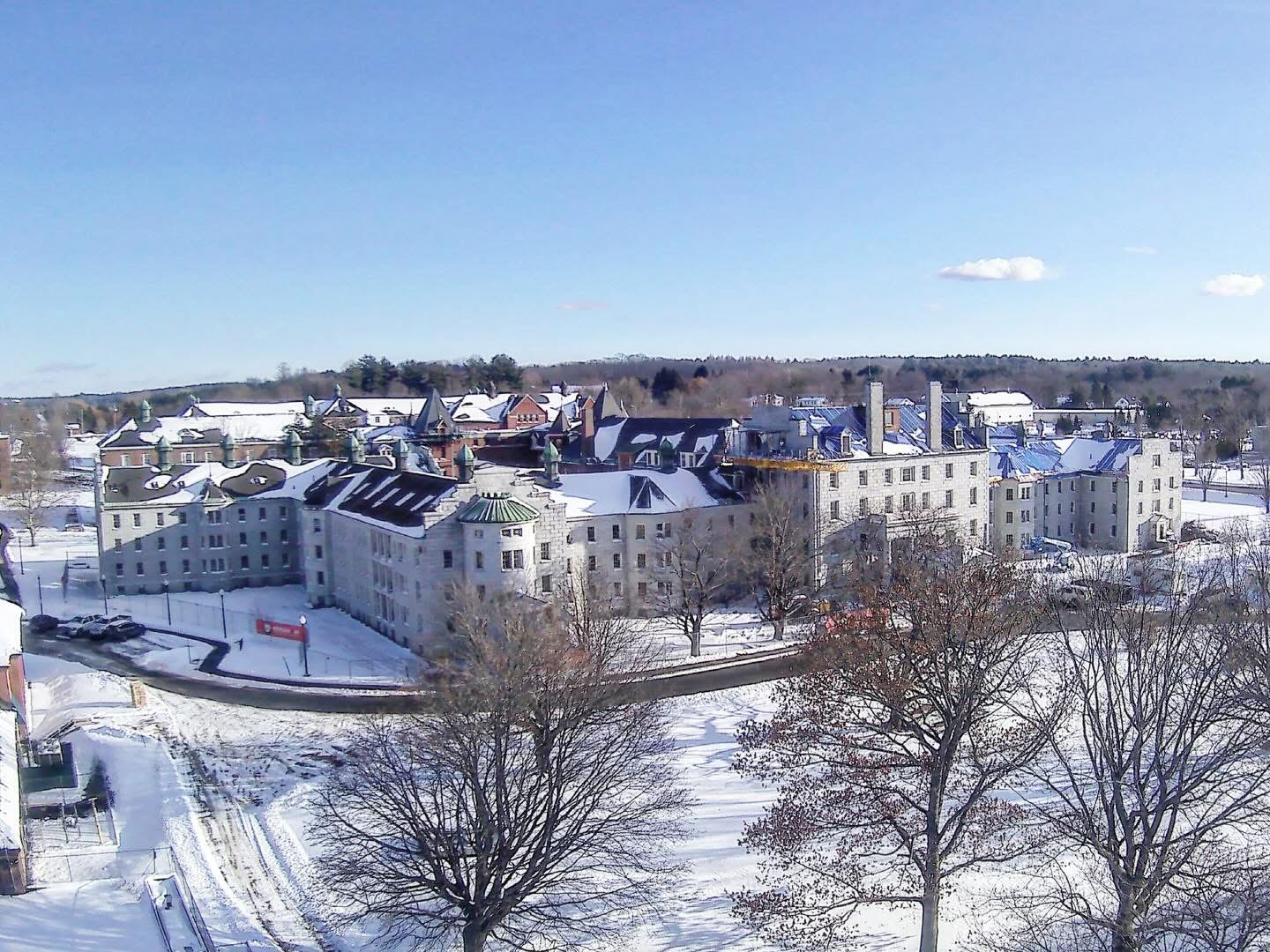
- Augusta Mental Health Institute Complex January 2024

- Location within Maine Location within the United States
- Location: 67 Independence Drive, Augusta, Maine
- Coordinates: 44°18′07″N 69°46′11″W
- Area: 9 acres (3.6 ha) (original listing); 90 acres (36 ha) (after boundary increase)
- Architect: Multiple
- Architectural style: Mixed, Italianate
- NRHP reference No.: 82000754 (original); 01000811 (increase)

Significant dates
- Added to NRHP: July 19, 1982
- Boundary increase: August 2, 2001

The Augusta Mental Health Institute (AMHI), was a psychiatric hospital in Augusta, Maine, United States. It was the principal facility for the care and treatment of Maine's mentally ill from 1840 to 2004, and its surviving buildings represent the oldest surviving complex of mental care facilities in the United States. The complex is located on the east bank of the Kennebec River, immediately south of the former Kennebec Arsenal, and now primarily houses state offices. In 2004, the hospital was replaced by the Riverview Psychiatric Center, located just to the south. The hospital's core complex was listed on the National Register of Historic Places in 1982, with the listing enlarged to encompass the entire campus in 2001.

== Description and history ==
The former institution is located on Augusta's east side bounded on the east by Hospital Street and the west by the Kennebec River, which separates the hospital from the state capitol complex. The National Historic Landmark Kennebec Arsenal, a former federal military facility, lies just to the north, and the modern complex of the Riverview Psychiatric Center is located just to the south. The hospital complex is a sprawling collection of buildings, most built of brick or stone, dating from the hospital's founding in 1840 to the mid-20th century.

On March 8, 1834, the legislature passed resolve to establish the Maine Insane Hospital by the appropriation of $20,000 upon condition that a like sum be raised by individual subscription within one year. Before the expiration of the time limit, Hon. Reuel Williams of Augusta and Hon. Benjamin Brown of Vassalboro contributed $10,000 each for the purpose. Subsequently Mr. Brown offered as a site 200 acres of land on the Kennebec in the town of Vassalboro which the legislature accepted, but which was not considered a suitable location, and the land with Mr. Brown's consent was sold by the state for $4,000, and the more suitable site in Augusta was purchased with $3,000 of this money. Mental health advocate Dorothea Dix was a consultant on the project, believing fresh air and removal from the stresses of society were important for patient care. Dorothea Dix Psychiatric Center (DDPC), Riverview’s sister hospital, is named after this early advocate for Maine’s mental health services in Maine.

Dr. Cyrus Knapp was the first Superintendent of the Hospital. From 1841 to 1845, psychiatrist Dr. Isaac Ray served as the hospital's superintendent. In that role Ray was one of the original thirteen founding members of the Association of Medical Superintendents of American Institutions for the Insane. Ray was succeeded by Dr. James Bates.

On December 4, 1850, a fire at the facility resulted in the death of 27 patients and one employee. It is the deadliest fire in Maine's history.

Numerous buildings and new wings were added over the years to the Hospital campus. By 1920, the total area of the hospital property, including the farm and grounds, was approximately 600 acres, of which 450 acres were under cultivation. Patients worked on the farm and in the laundry. The buildings are reflective of changing trends in the treatment of the mentally ill over that period of time. The oldest portions of the complex are known as the Administration and Stone Buildings. Now at the center of a series of connected buildings, they were built in 1836–40 to a design by Hallowell architect John Lord. To these were added stepped wings (in keeping with the then fashionable Kirkbride Plan) in the 1850s and 1860s; these were designed by Francis H. Fassett, with later alterations designed by George M. Coombs. In the 1880s, when "pavilion housing" prevailed as the preferred method for housing the mentally ill, a number of smaller outlying buildings were added, based on a master plan developed by Francis Fassett in the 1870s. The pavilion housing plan proved uneconomical for the large numbers of patients, and dormitory-style buildings were built, combining patient wings, housing for workers, and an administrative hub. The campus also includes a number of utilititarian service buildings, and was landscaped to provide an attractive environment to the patients.

The complex remained in continuous use until 2004, when the Riverview Psychiatric Center went into operation. As the patient population declined in the 20th century, spurred in part by changing trends in treatment methods, elements of the complex were repurposed to other uses, primarily state offices.

=== Naming ===
The facility operated under several names:

- Maine Insane Hospital (1840)
- Augusta Insane Asylum (date of change unknown)
- Augusta State Hospital (1913)
- Augusta Mental Health Institute (1973)
- Riverview Psychiatric Center (2004)

== See also ==
- National Register of Historic Places listings in Kennebec County, Maine
- List of disasters in Maine by death toll
