= Long Creek (Fore River tributary) =

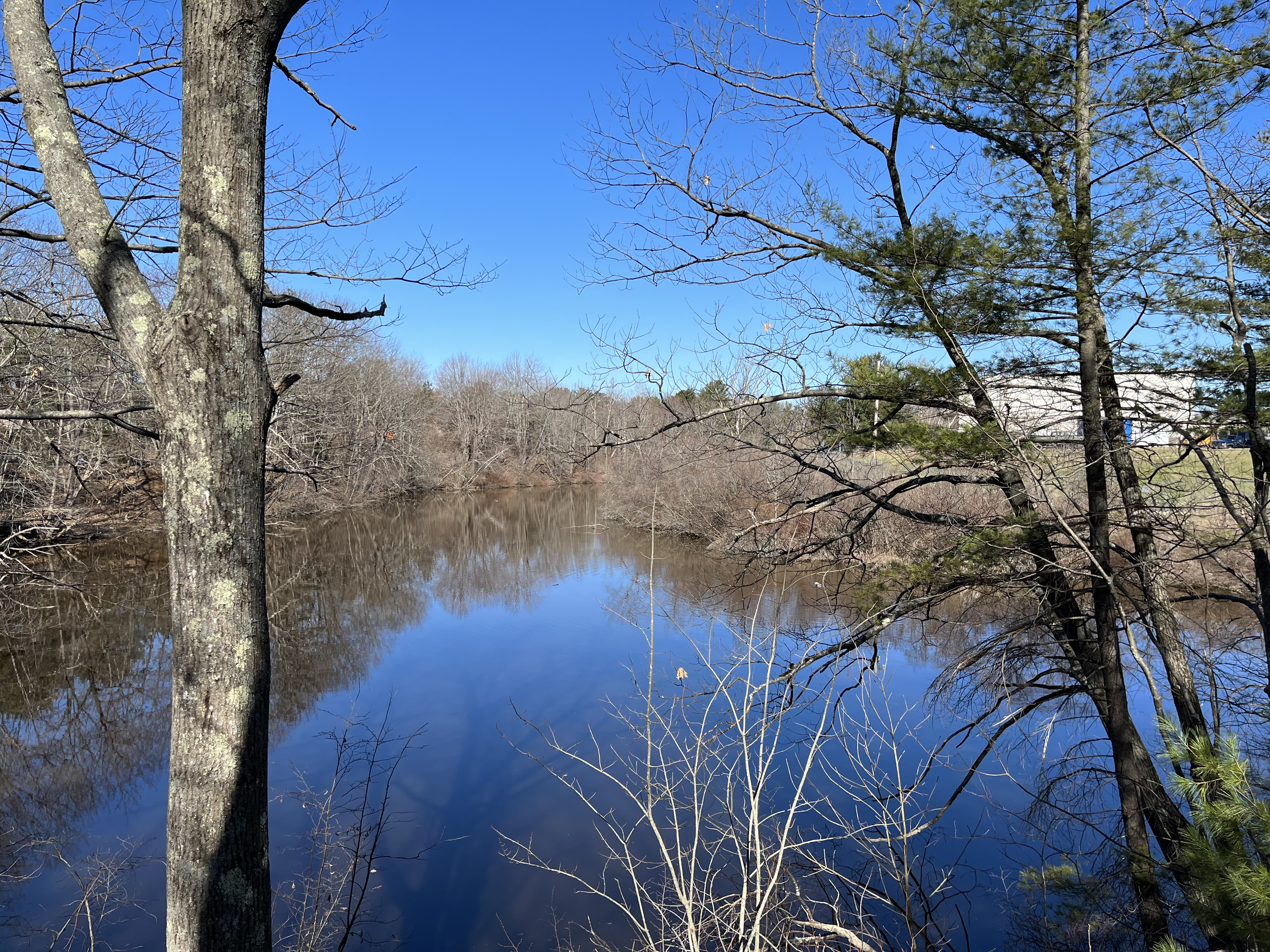
- Long Creek feeding into Clark Pond from the northwest

Location
- Country: United States

Physical characteristics
- Mouth: Fore River
  - location: South Portland, Maine
  - coordinates: 43.63377981°N 70.3240438°W
- Length: 3.8 mi (6.1 km)

Long Creek is a freshwater stream in southern Maine, United States. It is a tributary of the Fore River, into which it flows at South Portland, at the eastern edge of Portland International Jetport, via Clark Pond, directly south of Thompson's Point on the Portland side of the river. Its main branch is around 3.8 miles (6.1 km) long.

It has five tributaries: South Branch, Blanchette Brook, North Branch, East Branch and the western tributary.

Long Creek Youth Development Center stands near the mouth of the creek.

== Long Creek Watershed District ==
The Long Creek Water Management District undertakes the Long Creek Watershed Management Plan: "to design, engineer, construct, install, modify, use, maintain, repair, replace, inspect, and monitor public and private stormwater management."

In 2007, the Long Creek Restoration Project was established by four watershed municipalities: South Portland, Portland, Westbrook and Scarborough. It includes representatives of local businesses, non-profit organizations and state agencies. Its aim is to improve the quality of the creek's water to meet state standards. Since the mid-20th century, urban development has increased the amount of pollutants flowing into the creek, lowering the quality of the water, eroding its channel and increasing the creek's temperature.

The Clean Water Act of 1972 introduced the necessity for properties inside the Long Creek Watershed to possess a National Pollutant Discharge Elimination System permit to allow for the post-construction discharge of stormwater, and to help Long Creek avoid violations of the Maine Water Quality Standards.

Due to the proximity of the creek, in its latter stages, to both Interstate 95 and Interstate 295, much of the road salt used to melt snow and ice in the winter, to provide safer driving conditions, is washed into the creek afterward.

In 2024, a burning semi-trailer laden with produce, parked beside The Maine Mall, released diesel into Long Creek.

== Recreation ==
The Long Creek Trail runs beside the river for .75 miles (1.21 km). It is managed by the South Portland Land Trust, part of the Maine Land Trust Network.

== See also ==
- Long Creek Air Tragedy Memorial
