= Riverview Psychiatric Center =

Coordinates: 44°18′00″N 69°46′12″W

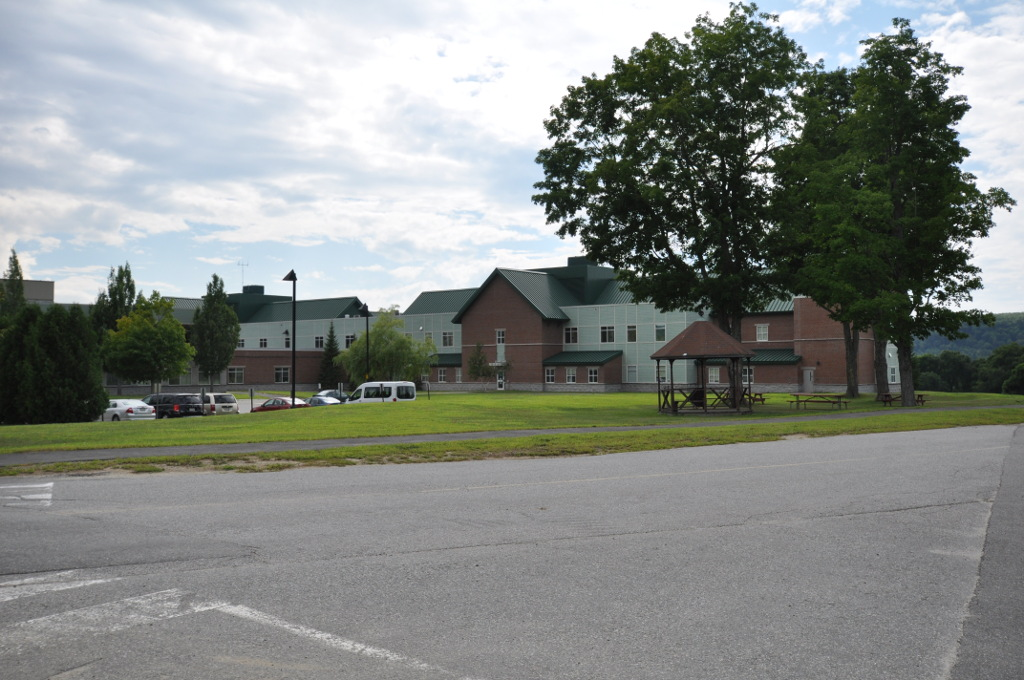

Geography
- Location: Augusta, Maine, United States

Organization
- Type: Specialist

Services
- Speciality: Psychiatric hospital

Links
- Lists: Hospitals in Maine

Riverview Psychiatric Center, also known as Riverview Psychiatric Recovery Center, is a psychiatric hospital in Augusta, Maine, operated by the Maine Department of Health and Human Services. The center recruits for volunteers from the United Way for certain services.

== History ==
Modern psychiatric hospitals evolved from, and eventually replaced, the older lunatic asylums. The development of the modern psychiatric hospital is also the story of the rise of organised, institutional psychiatry. In the 19th century, institutionalisation was found to be the "correct solution" to the problem of "madness".

In 1834, the Maine Legislature established the Maine Insane Hospital, and together with private donations, state appropriations enabled the hospital to open in 1840.

From 1946 to 1962, Dr. Francis Harper Sleeper (1900-1983) served as the superintendent, and his name lent itself to the Sleeper Era, a period of several changes to services, including "unitary control" of nursing, hiring of an additional psychologist and interns, hiring of a pharmacist and a dentist, and creation of a library with a librarian. From the late 1940s through the early 1960s, "the hospital experienced extensive over-crowding." In the 1960s, a new superintendent, Dr. John C. Patterson, mandated discharge of patients to support their rights (as opposed to leaves of absence), which raised admissions, yet, "the population began to drop because of use of new medications."

In the early 1970s, many patients were de-institutionalized under the rubric of patient rights, by supervisor Roy Ettlinger, which led to the inmate population dropping from 1,500 to 350. Patient advocates were also hired, and an ongoing reevaluation of the removal of patients continued throughout the 1980s and 1990s. In 2004, a new "92-bed civil and forensic psychiatric treatment facility" was built to replace the now-old state hospital.

In 2007, a state investigation revealed that many potential patients were turned away. At the time, a report to the state legislature reported that the vast majority had other places to go for help, but eight percent, or 30 patients, ended up in emergency rooms.

As of August 1, 2012, the center had 57 forensic patients and 35 civil patients, meaning that some forensic patients are occupying beds on the civil side of the hospital. The center also has recently put many forensic patients in nearby Augusta group homes, resulting in a petition with 150 signatures calling for their closure by neighbors with safety concerns. Augusta Mayor William Stokes also expressed concern over Augusta's bearing an unfair burden of mental health patients.

The federal Centers for Medicare and Medicaid Services announced on October 2, 2013, that Riverview's Medicare Provider Agreement would be terminated, ending the roughly $20 million in federal funds the center receives a year, due to numerous problems at the center. These include contentions that the facility is overcrowded, inadequately staffed, and has used improper methods to control patients, including the use of Tasers. DHHS Commissioner Mary Mayhew stated that the State would appeal the decision, and that if it stood, the Center cannot make up for the loss of the federal funds. In June 2014, the appeal was rejected, citing concerns about document compliance. Mayhew stated that progress has still been made, as only one issue was found by CMS as opposed to the eight initially found, and that DHHS would again reapply. Despite the appeal by the Department, Governor Paul LePage has expressed criticism of attempts to regain accreditation, once stating that "With the federal money, some of the fine print is so atrocious that sometimes we do more harm than good", though he later backed away from those comments, calling the loss of accreditation "shameful" and "disgusting".

In August 2014, the sign outside the center was replaced and featured a new name: the Riverview Psychiatric Recovery Center, though the legal name of the facility will remain as it was before. A DHHS spokesman stated that unlike the original one, the sign, which cost $1,236.30, is virtually maintenance free. The change in name was made to reflect "the new culture of recovery and excellence that is being built at the hospital". State legislators were not aware of the changes and State Senator Margaret Craven criticized the administration by saying "They pay more attention to signs than to treatment of people".

== Services ==
Riverview Psychiatric Center provides a number of services to patients.

The crisis stabilization unit is in effect an emergency room for psychiatry, frequently dealing with suicidal, violent, or otherwise critical individuals. Laws in many jurisdictions providing for long-term involuntary commitment require a commitment order issued by a judge within a short time (after 72 hours, the evaluation period) of the patient's entry to the unit, if the patient does not or is unable to give consent. In Maine, this is also true.

As of 2010, some criminal defendants are held at Riverview Psychiatric Center, especially those who claim the insanity defense.
