= Maine Department of Corrections =

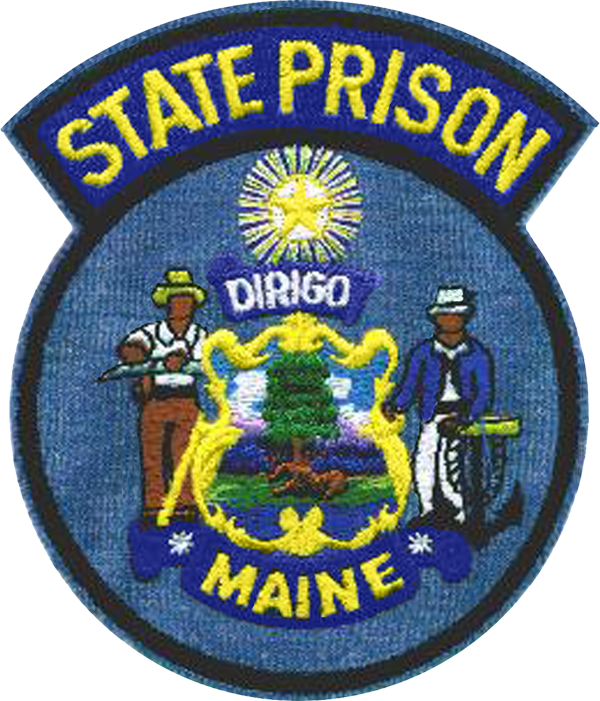
- Abbreviation: MDOC

Jurisdictional structure
- Operations jurisdiction: Maine, USA
- Map of Maine Department of Corrections's jurisdiction
- Population: 1,329,328
- General nature: Civilian police

Operational structure
- Headquarters: Augusta, Maine
- Agency executives: Randall Liberty, Commissioner; Anthony Cantillo, Deputy Commissioner; Scott Landry, Associate Commissioner; Gary Laplante, Director of Operations; Colin O'Neill, Associate Commissioner

Website
- MEDOC Website

The Maine Department of Corrections is a government agency in the U.S. state of Maine that is responsible for the direction and general administrative supervision, guidance and planning of both adult and juvenile correctional facilities and programs within the state. The agency has its headquarters in Augusta. As of January 2016, the Maine DOC had 2,223 inmates in its custody.

== History ==
In early 1823 the legislature authorized the construction of the first state prison. The facility was built in Thomaston atop the site of a limestone quarry.

== Adult institutions ==
- Bolduc Correctional Facility (inmate capacity 222)
- Mountain View Correctional Facility (inmate capacity 375)
- Maine Correctional Center (inmate capacity 662)
- Southern Maine Reentry Center (inmate capacity 64 Women)
- Maine State Prison (inmate capacity 916)
- Downeast Correctional Facility. Newer facility.
- Transitional Living Program In Bangor for males and Auburn for females. Probation only.

== Juvenile institutions ==
The Division of Juvenile Services operates the Long Creek Youth Development Center in South Portland. The headquarters of the division is in the Elkins Building in Augusta.

Mountain View was closed to juveniles and all juveniles moved to Long Creek. It is now an adult facility.

== See also ==
- List of law enforcement agencies in Maine
- List of United States state correction agencies
- List of U.S. state prisons
- Prison
