= Blaine House =

Historic house in Maine, United States

- U.S. National Register of Historic Places
- U.S. National Historic Landmark
- U.S. Historic district – Contributing property
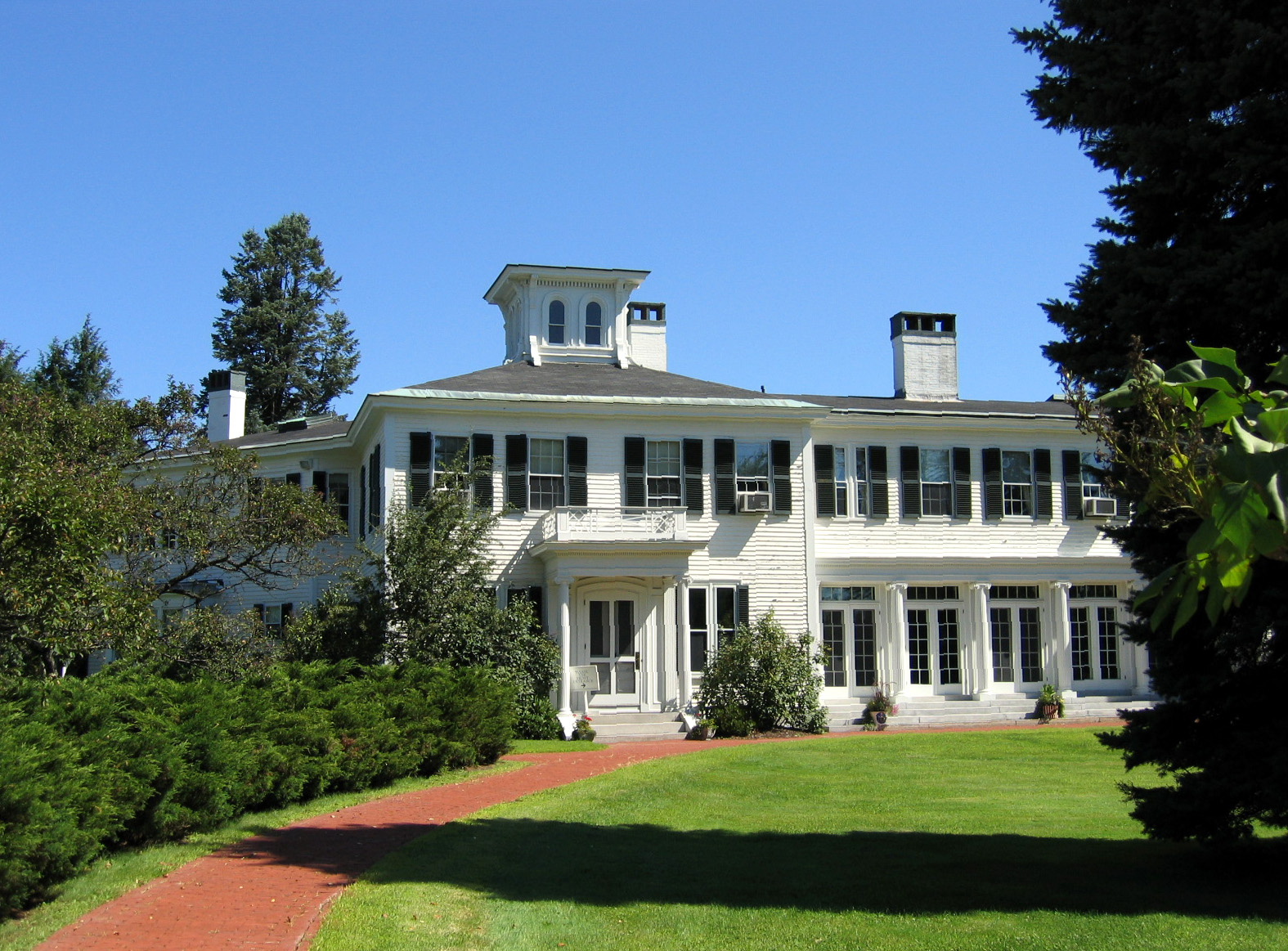

- Location within Maine Location within the United States
- Interactive map showing the location of Blaine House
- Location: Capitol and State Sts., Augusta, Maine
- Coordinates: 44°18′28.38″N 69°46′53″W
- Area: 2.4 acres (0.97 ha)
- Built: 1833
- Part of: Capitol Complex Historic District (ID01001417)
- NRHP reference No.: 66000024

Significant dates
- Added to NRHP: October 15, 1966
- Designated NHL: January 29, 1964
- Designated CP: December 31, 2001

The Blaine House, also known as the James G. Blaine House, is the official residence of the governor of Maine and their family. The executive mansion was officially declared the residence of the governor in 1919 with the name "Blaine House". It is located at Capitol and State streets in Augusta, across the street from the Maine State House.

== Description ==
The Blaine House was donated to the State of Maine for use as a governor's residence by Harriet Blaine Beale in 1919. The house dates back to 1833 and was built by James Hall, a retired ship's captain. James G. Blaine, then the Speaker of the Maine House of Representatives, purchased it in 1862 as a present for his wife, the former Harriet Stanwood, daughter of a prominent Augusta family. Blaine substantially enlarged the building, constructing an addition at the rear that was a near replica of the original structure, and removing interior walls to create a large entertainment space.

During World War I, the house was used by Maine's Committee for Public Safety. It was presented to the State by Blaine's youngest daughter, Mrs. Harriet Blaine Beale, and established by the 1919 Legislature as the official residence of the governor of Maine. It was remodeled, to designs by the noted Maine architect John Calvin Stevens, prior to the first governor taking residence in 1921. Carl E. Miliken was the first governor to occupy the residence.

The Blaine House was declared a National Historic Landmark in 1964, for its association with Blaine, an influential political and diplomatic figure on the national stage in the decades following the Civil War.

In June 2014, a system of high efficiency heat pumps was installed in the Blaine House in an effort to reduce the heating bill, after a test of one over the winter in the governor's sleeping quarters. With heating oil, the Blaine House used 5,074 gallons of oil at a cost of $16,775 in 2013. The oil boiler is also going to be converted to natural gas in a further effort to reduce costs, though that system will only be needed on the coldest days. The total cost of the upgrades is expected to be $115,000.

The current resident is Governor Janet Mills.

== See also ==
External videos
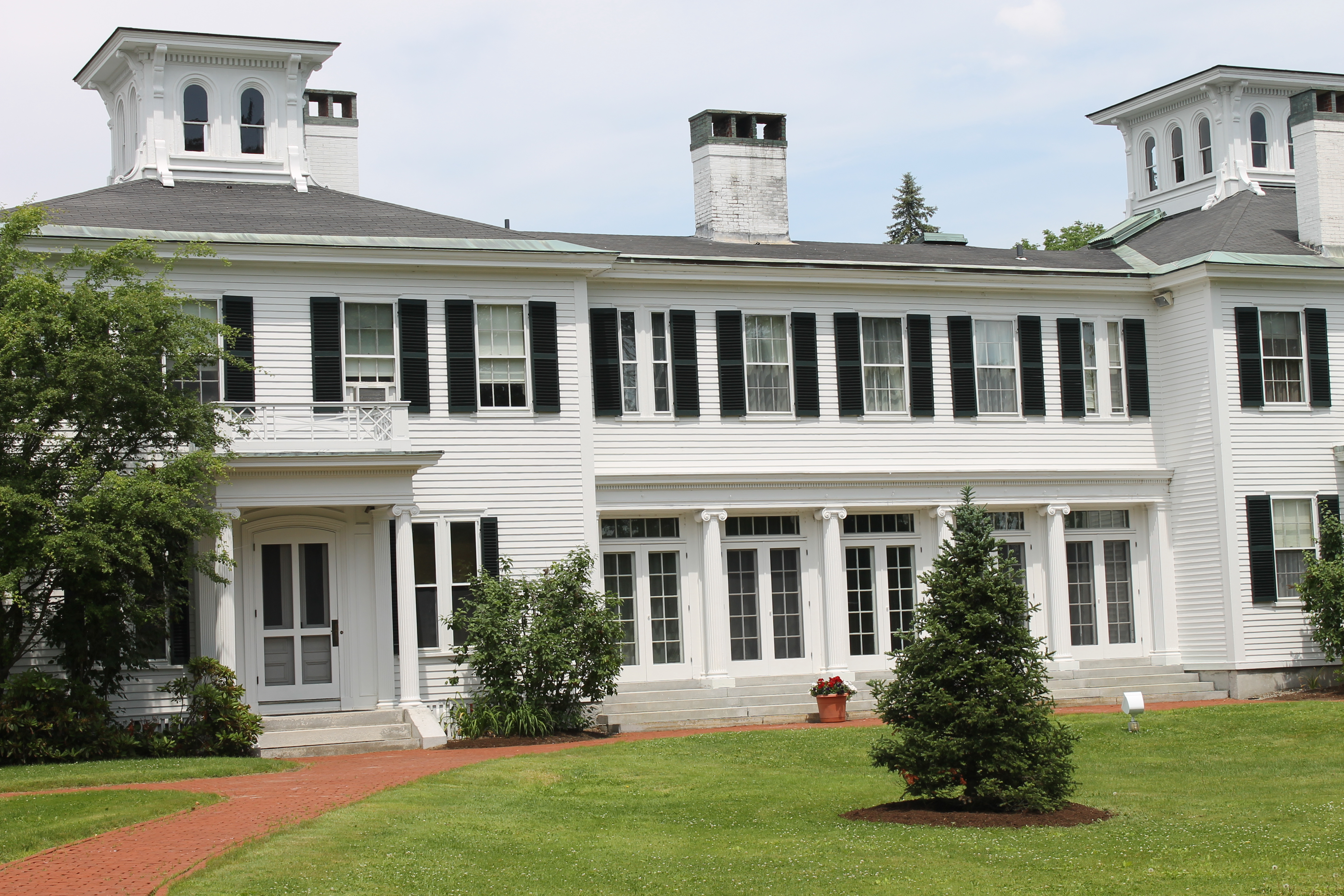
- C-SPAN Cities Tour - Augusta: The Blaine House, 9:58, C-SPAN

- List of National Historic Landmarks in Maine
- National Register of Historic Places listings in Kennebec County, Maine
