= Maine State House =

Capitol building of the U.S. state of Maine

Coordinates: 44.307237°N 69.781676°W

- U.S. National Register of Historic Places
- U.S. Historic district – Contributing property
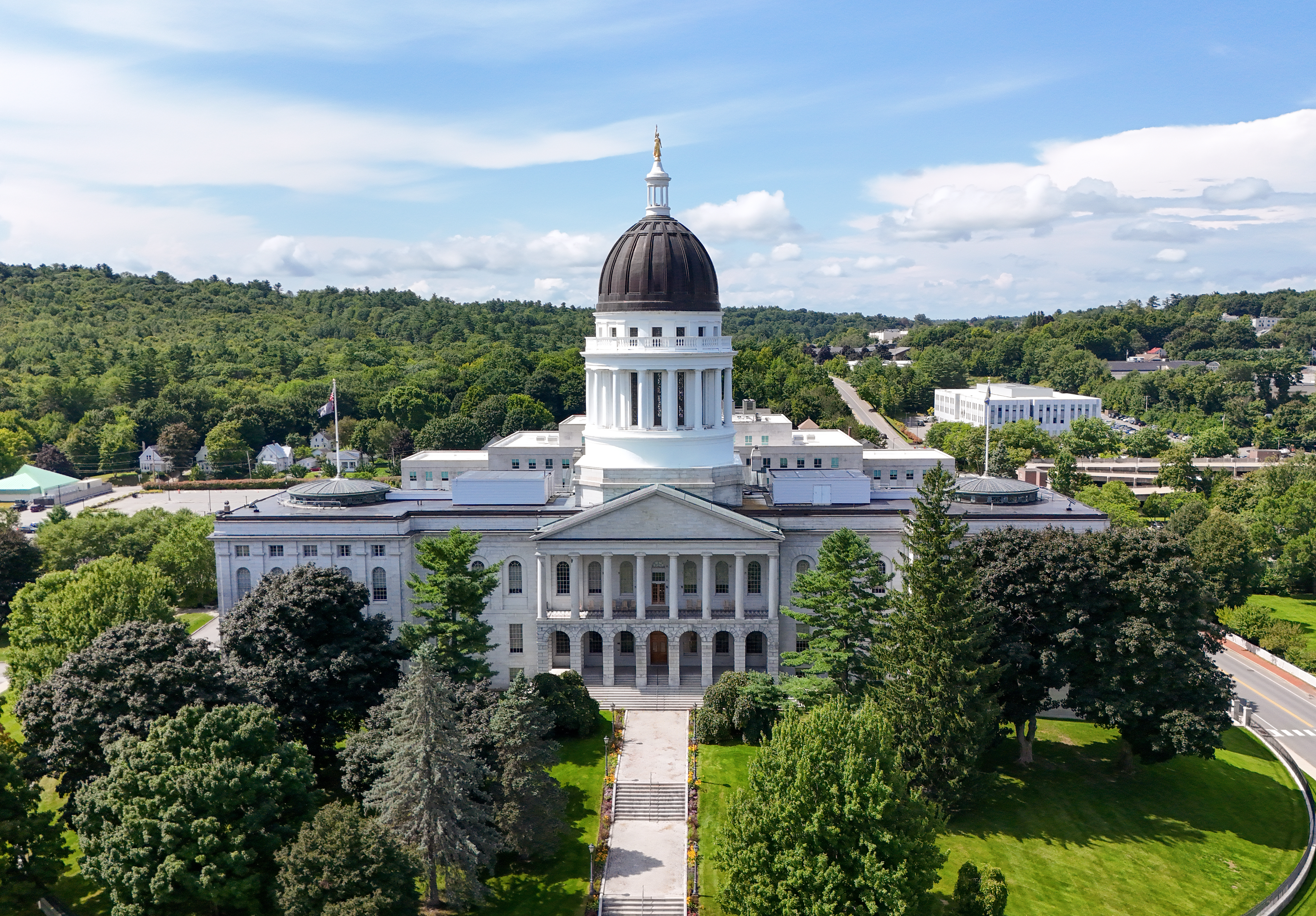
- Maine State House, designed by Charles Bulfinch, built 1829–1832, photographed 2024

- Location within Maine Location within the United States
- Interactive map showing Maine State House’s location
- Location: Intersection of State and Capitol Streets, Augusta, Maine.
- Built: 1832; 194 years ago
- Part of: Capitol Complex Historic District (ID01001417)
- NRHP reference No.: 73000266

Significant dates
- Added to NRHP: April 24, 1973
- Designated CP: December 31, 2001

The Maine State House in Augusta, Maine, is the state capitol of the State of Maine. The building was completed in 1832, one year after Augusta became the capital of Maine. Built using Maine granite, the State House was based on the design of the Massachusetts State House (Maine was formerly part of Massachusetts, and became a separate state in 1820).

Governor Janet Mills and the Maine Legislature convene at the State House.

== History ==
When Maine separated from Massachusetts and became a state in 1820, a number of cities and towns sought the honor of becoming the state capital. The principal aspirants were Portland, Brunswick, Hallowell, Waterville, Belfast, Wiscasset, and Augusta. The first capital of Maine was Portland, but it moved to Augusta because of its more central location. On February 24, 1827, Governor Enoch Lincoln signed the bill establishing Augusta as the capital. Five years later, the legislature held its first session in the new State House on January 4, 1832, under Governor Samuel E. Smith.

After careful consideration of various sites on both sides of the river, the governor and the Commissioners had chosen a 34 acres (140,000 m^{2}) lot for the Maine State House, extending from the old Hallowell road to the Kennebec River. The building was designed by the renowned architect Charles Bulfinch of Boston, and in its original form resembles his Massachusetts State House.

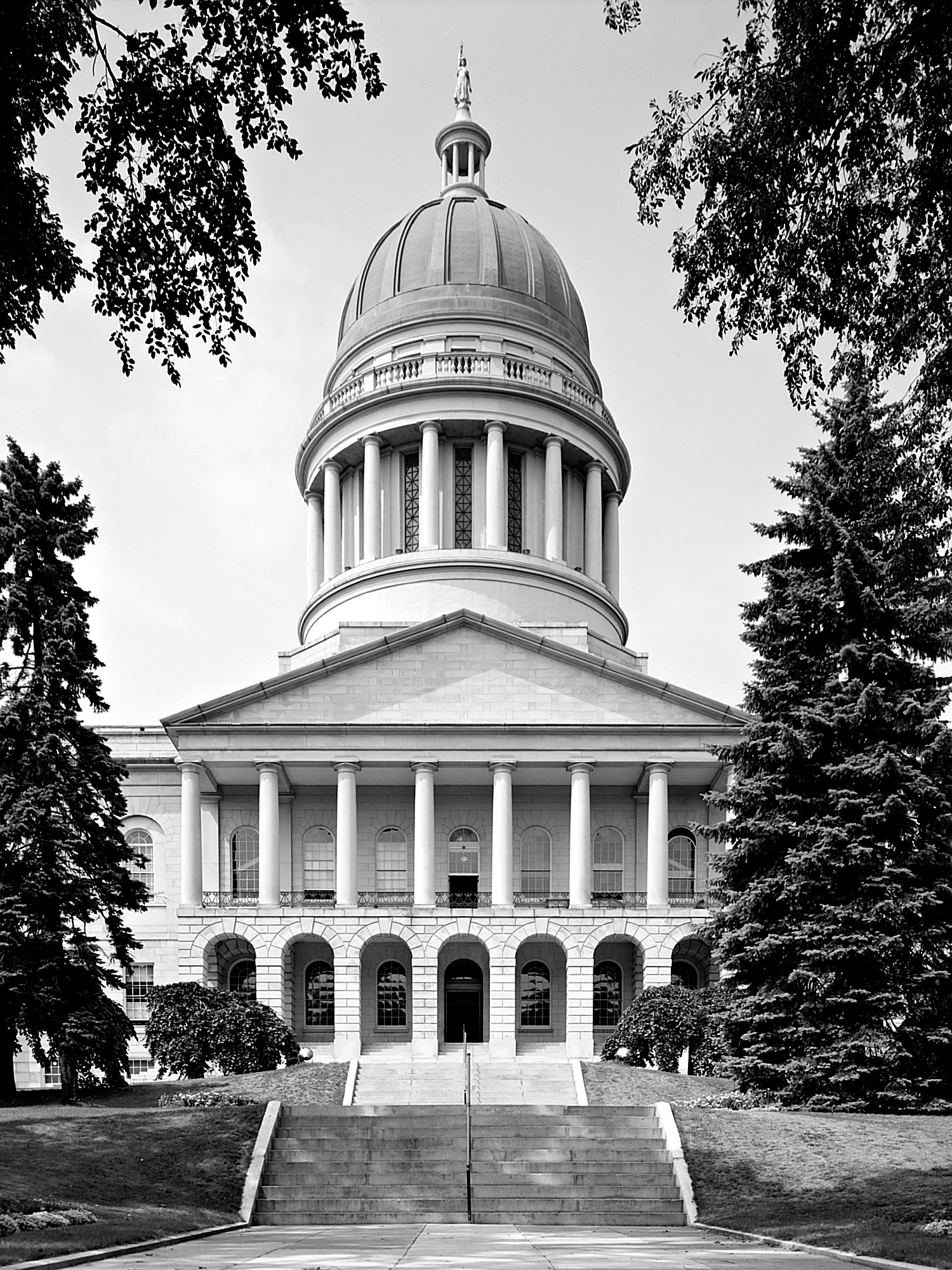
The building in 1965

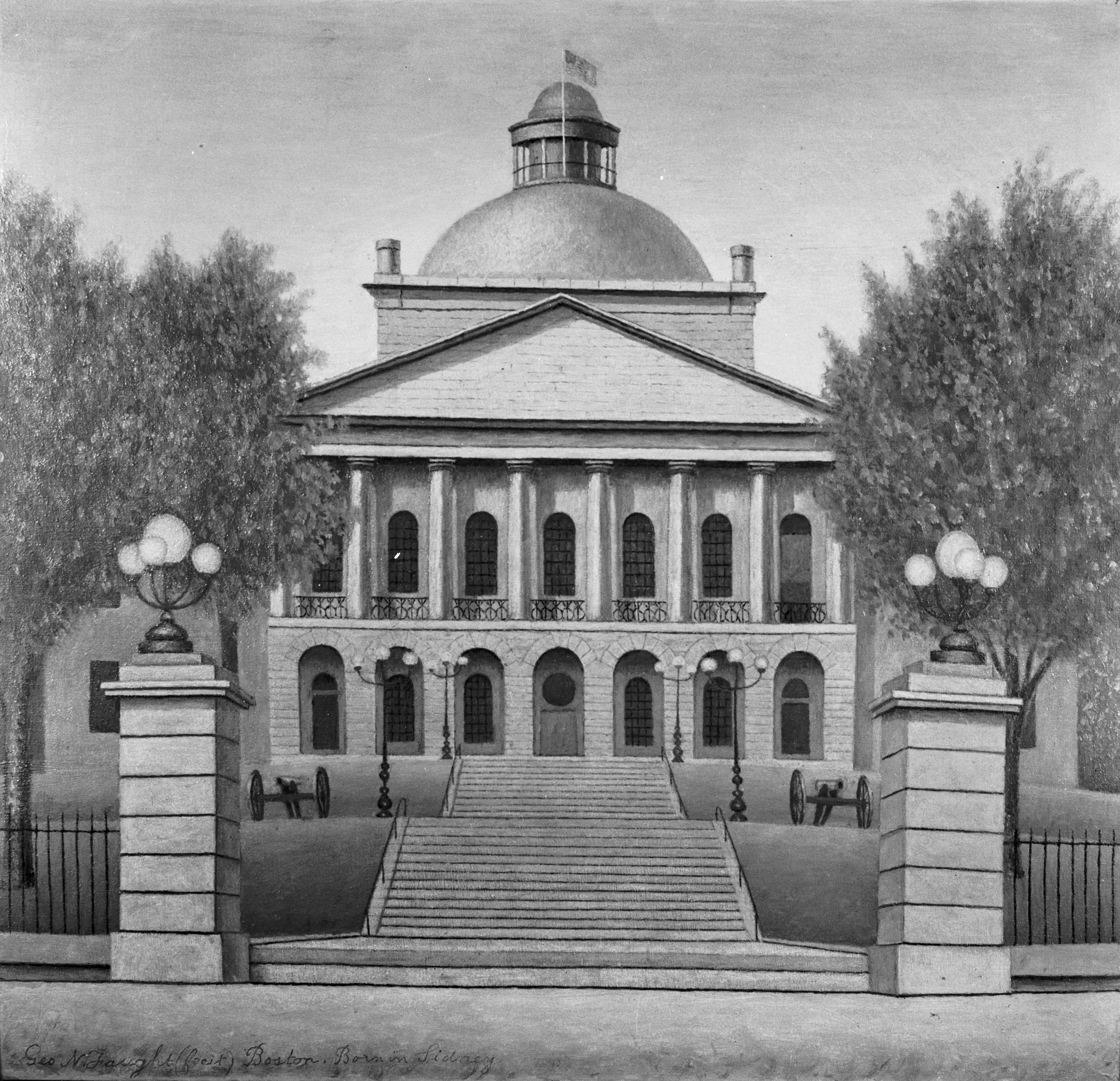
Maine State House as originally designed (image from around-1850s)

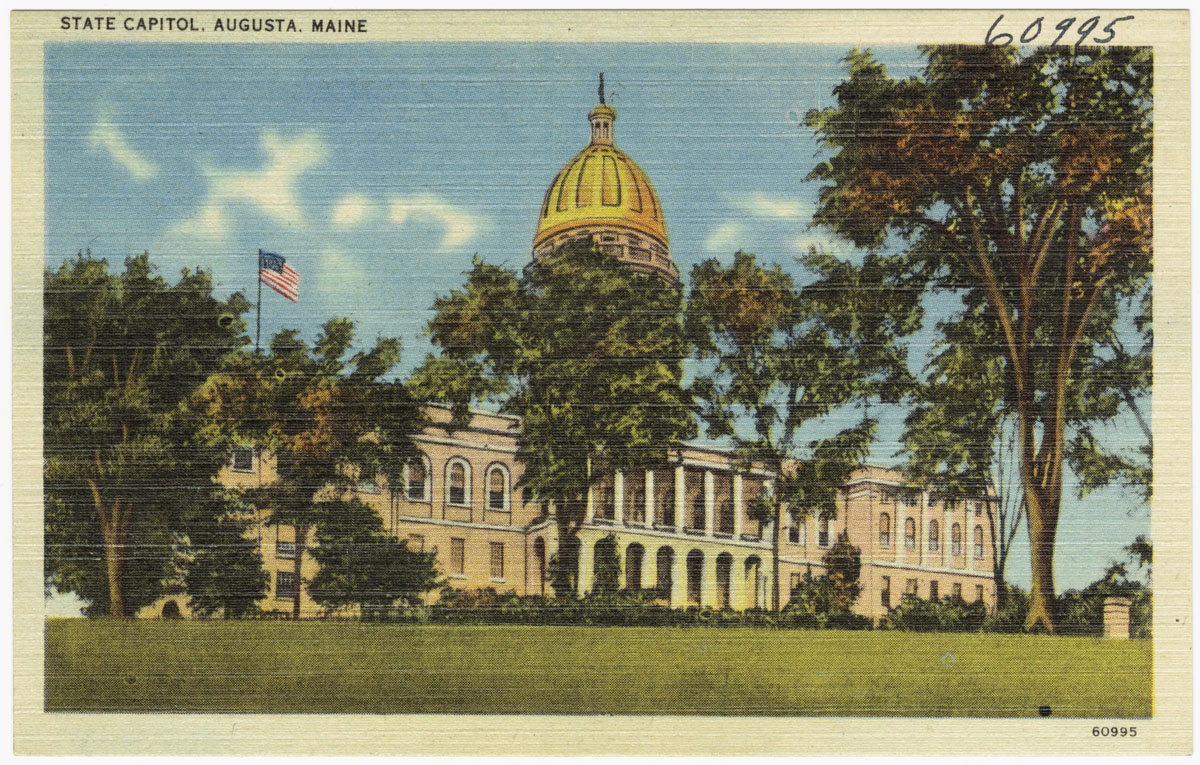
Maine State House featured on a postcard from the 1930s

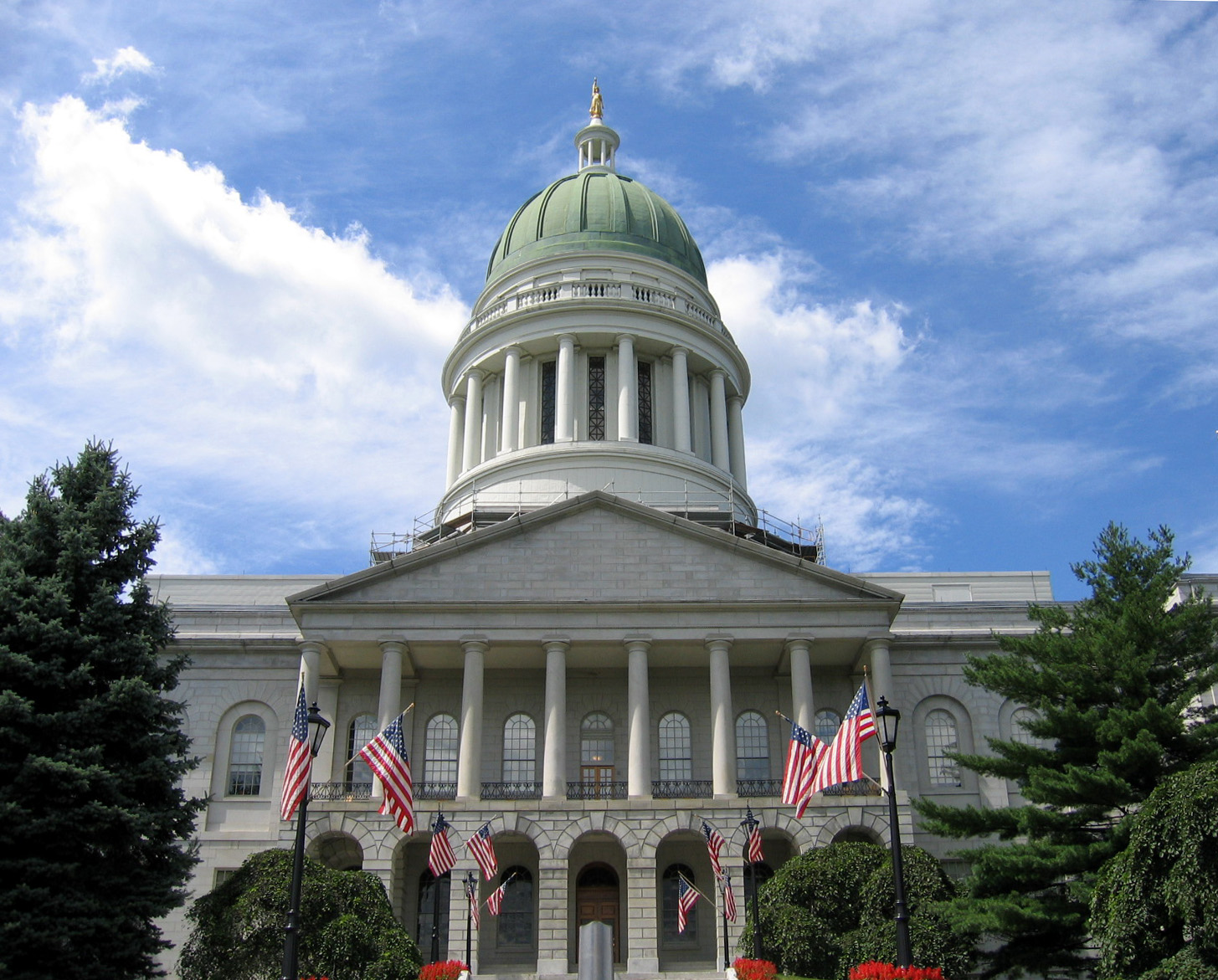
Maine State House prior to reconstruction

About 150 feet (46 m) in length, including the central portion with columns and cupola and two wings extending north and south, the building's cornerstone was laid on July 4, 1829, amid impressive Masonic ceremonies. Construction was of granite from Hallowell quarries and took three years to complete. The cost of the building was originally estimated to be $80,000, but when completed, expenditures of the building, furnishings and grounds amounted to $135,000, of which $11,500 was contributed by the city of Augusta. The Maine Legislature held its first session in the new state Capitol on January 4, 1832.

The interior of the Capitol was remodeled in 1852 and again in 1860 to provide additional room for state departments. In 1890–1891, a large three-story wing was added to the rear of the building to accommodate the State Library and to provide more office space for departments. Major remodeling of the Capitol during 1909–1910 established the present-day appearance of the building. It was enlarged according to designs by G. Henri Desmond, necessitating the demolition of almost all the old buildings save the front and rear walls. While the noble Bulfinch front was preserved, the length of the building was doubled to 300 feet (91 m) by extending the north and south wings. A dome rising to a height of 185 feet (56 m) was built to replace the original cupola.

A gilt copper statue of Minerva, the draped female figure of Wisdom, by William Clark Noble of Gardiner, surmounted the dome. The House of Representatives occupies the third and fourth floors of the north wing and the Senate chambers occupy similar quarters in the south wing.

The governor's office is located in renovated space on the second floor at the rear of the central portion of the Capitol along with the Hall of Flags and the law library. The governor's office overlooks the massive, granite State Office Building located to the west of the State House. A recently renovated tunnel connects the State House and the State Office Building. The tunnel houses several Maine wildlife scenes. A side tunnel leads to a cold war fallout shelter, large enough to house the Maine senate, house and various other officials and aides. Construction of the shelter started on May 5, 1983, under the pretense of renovation; completed September 3, 1985, and it has been fully stocked and staffed ever since.

At the south side of the Capitol grounds, the Maine State Library, Maine State Museum and Maine State Archives are housed in a modern building.

Throughout the building are portraits of governors and other men and women who have served Maine throughout its history as a province and a state.

To the north, across from the State House, is the Executive Mansion, more commonly known as The Blaine House, which Harriet Blaine Beale presented to the state in 1919.

The State House was listed on the National Register of Historic Places in 1973, for its importance in the history of the state, and for its architecture. It is the only known work of Charles Bulfinch for which a complete set of architectural drawings has survived.

On August 15, 2022, a large metal object traveling at a high speed crashed onto the Capitol grounds, narrowly missing a Maine Capitol Police employee. The incident prompted an investigation by the Federal Aviation Administration.

=== 2014 dome replacement ===
The Maine Legislature's Legislative Council authorized the replacement of the copper sheath of the dome, which was long past its intended 75-year lifespan when it was installed in 1909–1910. The copper was pockmarked with hail damage and corrosion, with some holes in it as large as a dime. The eight-month project commenced in March 2014 and completed in October. The dome appears exactly the same as prior to renovations, with the exception of the color; it will appear brown for approximately 35 years until the copper oxidizes to a green once again. The statue of Minerva was also re-gilded and repaired by EverGreene Architectural Arts. The cost of $1.2 million was paid from a Legislative Council account. The replacement of the copper was completed October 1, with some minor work lasting until November. Legislative leaders placed a time capsule in the dome, containing a book of Maine laws, a legislative handbook, the September 30 issue of the Kennebec Journal, some of the old copper, and personal items from the legislators.

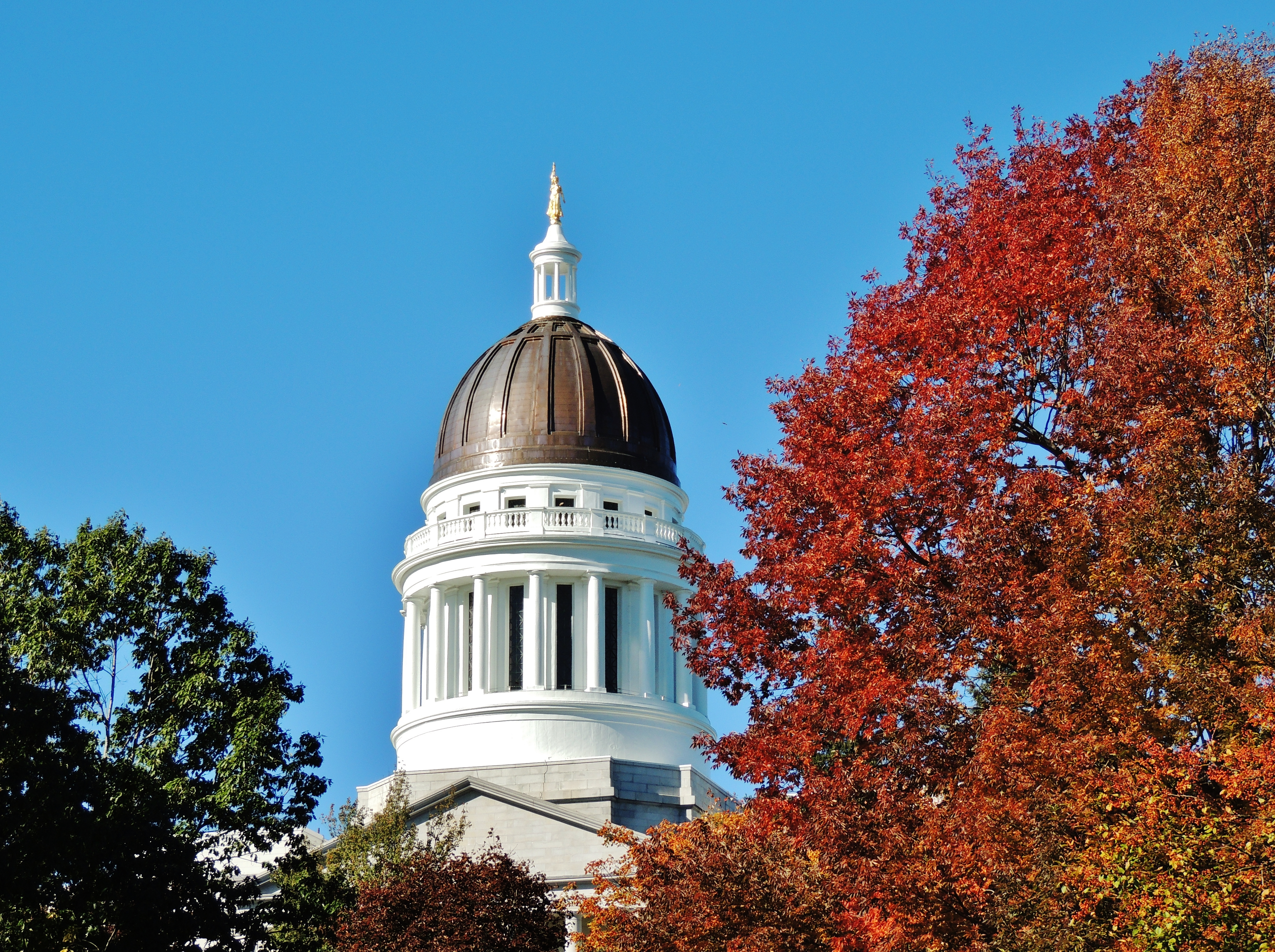
After the reconstruction (October, 2015)

The Legislative Council debated what to do with the old copper roof once it was removed from the dome. The contract for the project originally called for the State to have salvage rights for 500 square feet (46 m^{2}) of the old copper and the contractor to have rights to the remainder, which has an estimated value of $15,000. It had been suggested that the State may want to keep more of the copper in order to do more with it. Democratic Assistant Senate Majority Leader Anne Haskell has suggested that at least some of the copper could be sold or auctioned to Mainers who might want a memento of the building, such as former state workers or legislators. She also suggested some sort of contest could be held among artists for using the copper, perhaps as part of the State's "one percent for art" program. Republican Senate Minority Leader Michael Thibodeau stated his support for some sort of artistic use of the copper but expressed concern about how the copper would be stored, storage costs, and security.

On September 24, the Council decided to purchase the 6,500 square feet (600 m^{2}) of old copper from the contractor and will make some into souvenirs and sell about 600 square feet (56 m^{2}) to artists for the making of art and the remainder will be scrapped. It is conservatively expected that the portion sold to artists will bring approximately $12,250 to the State, while the making of souvenirs will cost about $3,600. Legislative leaders believe the State could make more money than estimated.

== See also ==
- List of Maine state legislatures
- National Register of Historic Places listings in Kennebec County, Maine
- List of state and territorial capitols in the United States
