= Governor of Maine =

Head of government of the U.S. state of Maine

- Seal of the governor

- Flag of the State of Maine

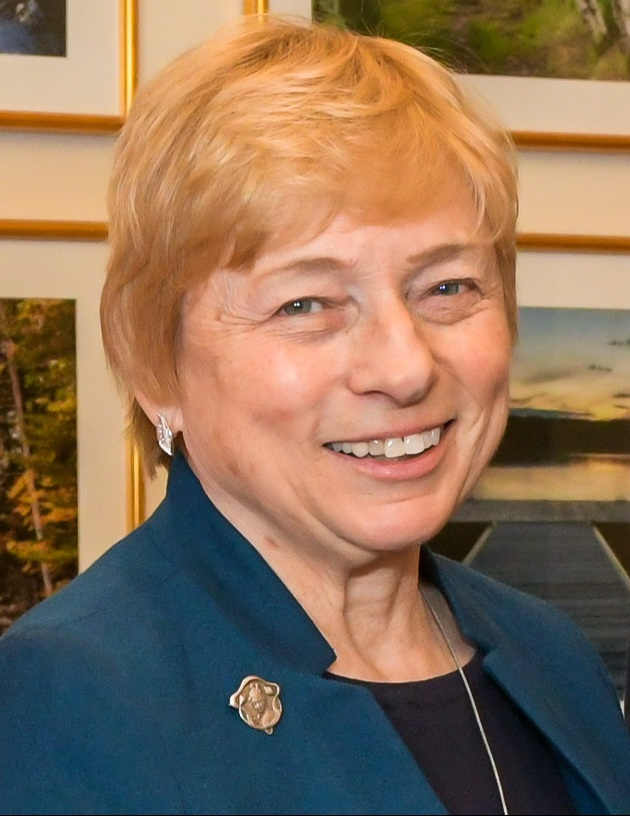
- Incumbent; Janet Mills since January 2, 2019
- Government of Maine
- Style: Governor (informal); The Honorable (formal)
- Status: Head of state Head of government
- Residence: The Blaine House
- Seat: Augusta, Maine
- Appointer: Popular vote
- Term length: 4 years, renewable once consecutively
- Constituting instrument: Constitution of Maine
- Precursor: Governor of Massachusetts (District of Maine)
- Inaugural holder: William King
- Formation: March 15, 1820
- Succession: Line of succession
- Salary: $70,000 (2022)
- Website: Official website

The governor of Maine is the head of government of the U.S. state of Maine. Before Maine was admitted to the Union in 1820, Maine was part of Massachusetts and the governor of Massachusetts was chief executive.

The current governor of Maine is Janet Mills, a Democrat, who took office January 2, 2019.

The governor of Maine receives a salary of $70,000, which is the lowest salary out of all 50 state governors, as of 2022. This will be raised to $125,000 upon a new governor taking office in early 2027, per a bill passed in 2025, as the Maine Constitution prohibits changing the salary of the sitting governor.

== Eligibility ==
Under Article V, Section 4, a person must as of the commencement of the term in office, be 30 years old, for 15 years a citizen of the United States, and for five years a resident of Maine. A governor must retain residency in Maine while in office. Section 5 provides that a person shall not assume the office of Governor while holding any other office under the United States, Maine, or "any other power".

== Elections and terms of office ==
Governors are elected directly for four-year terms. They may be elected any number of times, but with a limit of two consecutive elected terms.(Article V, Section 2). Elections are by popular vote, but if two people tie for first place, the Legislature meets in joint session to choose between them (Article V, Section 3).

The Maine Constitution of 1820 originally established a gubernatorial term of one year, to begin on the first Wednesday of January; constitutional amendments expanded this to two years in 1879 and to four years in 1957. The 1957 amendment also prohibited governors from succeeding themselves after serving two terms.

== Executive powers ==
The governor is commander-in-chief of "the army and navy of the State, and of the militia" (the Maine National Guard), except when under federal control (Article V, Section 7). The governor generally has the power to appoint civil, military, and judicial officers (aside from probate judges and justices of the peace), subject to confirmation by the Legislature, unless the Maine Constitution or a statute has provided another means of appointment (Article V, Section 8). The governor also has the power to grant pardons, reprieves, and commutations, except in cases of impeachment. This clemency power also includes juvenile offenses (Article V, Section 11).

== Cabinet ==
The governor oversees the executive branch, which includes Maine's state agencies. Their cabinet is often considered to be the state's commissioners, which are generally nominated by the governor but legally chosen by the Maine Legislature.

=== Current cabinet ===
The Mills cabinet as of January 2019
Office	Name	Since
Governor	Janet Mills	2019
Commissioner of the Department of Administrative & Financial Services	Kirsten Figueroa	2019
Commissioner of the Department of Agriculture, Conservation and Forestry	Amanda Beal	2019
Commissioner of the Department of Corrections	Randall Liberty	2019
Commissioner of the Department of Defense, Veterans and Emergency Management	Douglas Farnham	2016
Commissioner of the Department of Economic and Community Development	Heather Johnson	2019
Commissioner of the Department of Education	Pender Makin	2019
Commissioner of the Department of Environmental Protection	Melanie Loyzim	2021
Commissioner of the Department of Health & Human Services	Jeanne Lambrew	2019
Commissioner of the Department of Inland Fisheries & Wildlife	Judy Camuso	2019
Commissioner of the Department of Marine Resources	Patrick C. Keliher	2012
Commissioner of the Department of Public Safety	Michael Sauschuck	2019
Commissioner of the Department of Transportation	Bruce Van Note	2019
Commissioner of the Department of Labor	Laura Fortman	2019
Commissioner of the Department of Professional & Financial Regulation	Anne Head	2008
Executive Director of Workers' Compensation Board	John Rohde	2019

== Succession ==
Maine is one of five states that does not have an office of lieutenant governor. Under current law, if there is a vacancy in the office of governor, the president of the Maine Senate becomes governor. As of December 4, 2024, the Senate president is Democrat Mattie Daughtry.

== Official residence ==
The Blaine House in Augusta is the official governor's mansion, and is located across the street from the Maine State House. It became the official residence in 1919, and is named for James G. Blaine, who once owned the mansion. The house was built by Captain James Hall in 1833 and declared a National Historic Landmark in 1964.

== Timeline ==
Timeline of Maine governors
