= Homelessness in Maine =

Maine has one of the highest per capita rates of homelessness of any state within the East Coast of the United States. This may be attributed to several factors, including social issues that are more prevalent within New England.

Maine had 4,400 people experiencing homelessness according to a count done by MaineHousing, done in January 2022. This is over 0.3 per 100,000 residents, slightly higher than the 0.15% figure of Americans that experience a spectrum of homelessness. Nearly one-quarter of homeless individuals were under age 18, according to the survey. Almost half of households experiencing homelessness have at least one child.

Some 3,291 people were sheltered during the state's point-in-time count, and the other 1,100 people were unsheltered. Most homeless people in Maine live in the Portland area. During the late 2010s and 2020s, homelessness arose in Maine, with tent cities being formed in the Greater Portland area.

Many homeless resources in Portland are located in the Preble Street area, including the Florence House.

The homeless population is disproportionately African American; 2% of Mainers are Black, whereas 47% of homeless people in Maine are Black. 48% are White, lower than the state's 92% White figure; 0.5% are Asian/Pacific Islander compared to Maine being 1.5% Asian, and the Native American homeless population is roughly the same as the general population (0.8 and 0.7% respectively). A figure for people of Hispanic ethnicity was not reported. 33% of Maine homeless are under 18, although the vast majority of this demographic take shelter in homeless shelters or transitional homes.

== See also ==
- Homelessness in the United States by state
