= State of Maine (song) =

US state anthem, adopted in 1937

- Regional anthem of Maine
- Lyrics: Roger Vinton Snow, 1937
- Music: Roger Vinton Snow, 1937
- Adopted: 1937

Audio sample
- "State of Maine" (instrumental): file; help

The "State of Maine" is the anthem of the U.S. state of Maine, adopted as the state song in 1937. It was written and composed by Roger Vinton Snow, who died in 1953.

== Lyrics ==
Grand State of Maine,
proudly we sing
To tell your glories to the land,
To shout your praises till the echoes ring.
Should fate unkind
send us to roam,
The scent of the fragrant pines,
the tang of the salty sea
Will call us home.

CHORUS:
Oh, Pine Tree State,
Your woods, fields and hills,
Your lakes, streams and rock bound coast
Will ever fill our hearts with thrills,
And tho' we seek far and wide
Our search will be in vain,
To find a fairer spot on earth
Than Maine! Maine! Maine!
