= Florence House =

Homeless shelter in Portland, Maine

Coordinates: 43°39′02″N 70°16′41″W

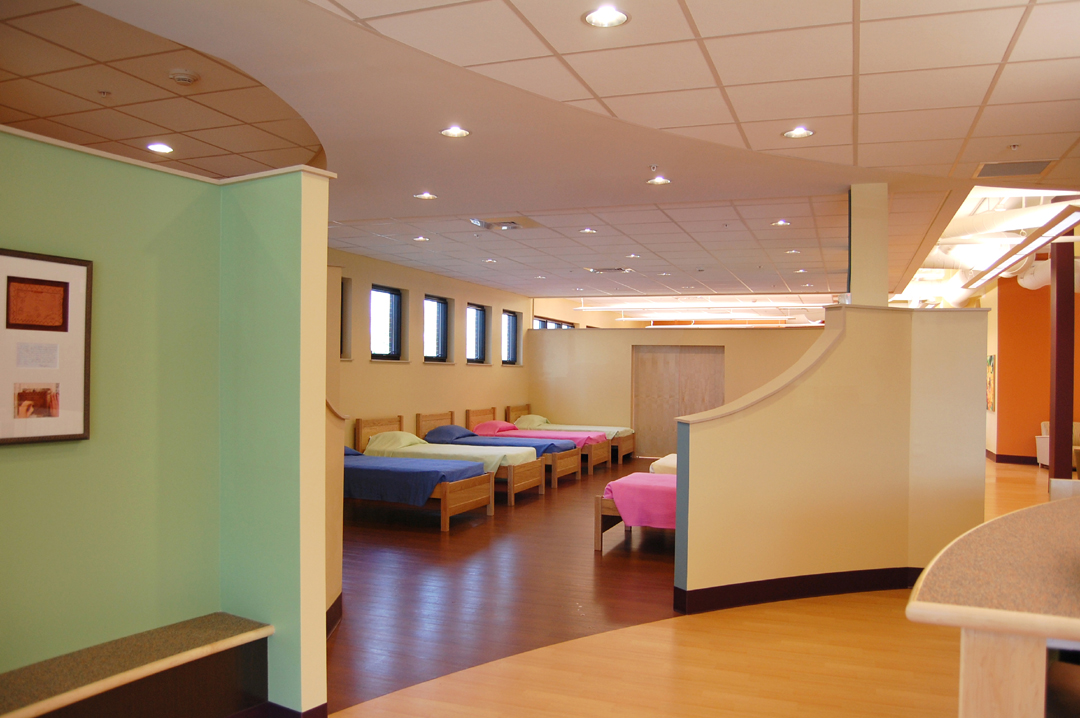
Florence House

Florence House is a 3 1/2 story building in Portland, Maine, United States, named after Florence Young "a social worker who spent more than 20 years working at Preble Street."

The building was created to help end homelessness. Florence House is based on the Housing First model, a strategy to help move women from homelessness to a permanent supportive home environment.

Florence House can house 50 or more former homeless women. The building includes 25 efficiency apartments, a safe-haven area with 15 semi-private spaces and 10 to 25 emergency shelter beds

The $7.9 million facility was completed on April 6, 2009. It was developed by Preble Street and Avesta Housing and received state and federal funding as well as private contributions.

The opening in April, 2009 (five years after the project started) was attended by Maine Governor John Baldacci, Shaun Donovan (Secretary of Housing and Urban Development — HUD), Senator Olympia Snowe, Senator Susan Collins, Representative Chellie Pingree, and other dignitaries.

== Sources ==
- Florence House Gives Homeless Women a Second Chance Maine Insights, August 27, 2010.
