= Maine =

U.S. state

- State
- Flag Seal
- Nicknames: The Pine Tree State; Vacationland
- Motto(s): "Dirigo" (Latin for "I lead", "I guide", or "I direct")
- Anthem: State of Maine
- Location of Maine within the United States
- Country: United States
- Before statehood: Part of Massachusetts (District of Maine)
- Admitted to the Union: March 15, 1820; 206 years ago (23rd)
- Capital: Augusta
- Largest city: Portland
- Largest county or equivalent: Cumberland
- Largest metro and urban areas: Portland

Government
  - Governor: Janet Mills (D)
  - Senate President: Mattie Daughtry (D) (Note: In the event of a vacancy in the office of governor, the president of the State Senate is first in line to become governor.)
- Legislature: State Legislature
  - Upper house: Senate
  - Lower house: House of Representatives
- Judiciary: Maine Supreme Judicial Court
- U.S. senators: Susan Collins (R); Angus King (I) (Note: While Angus King is a registered independent, he has caucused with the Democrats in every Congressional session since he entered the Senate in 2013.)
- U.S. House delegation: 1. Chellie Pingree (D); 2. Jared Golden (D) (list)

Area
  - Total: 35,380 sq mi (91,633 km^{2})
  - Land: 30,843 sq mi (79,883 km^{2})
  - Water: 4,540 sq mi (11,750 km^{2}) 12.8%
  - Rank: 39th

Dimensions
  - Length: 320 mi (515 km)
  - Width: 210 mi (330 km)
- Elevation: 590 ft (180 m)
- Highest elevation (Mount Katahdin (Note: Elevation adjusted to North American Vertical Datum of 1988)): 5,270 ft (1,606.4 m)
- Lowest elevation (Atlantic Ocean): 0 ft (0 m)

Population (2025)
  - Total: ▲1,414,874
  - Rank: 42nd
  - Density: 44/sq mi (16.9/km^{2})
  - Rank: 38th
  - Median household income: $73,700 (2023)
  - Income rank: 35th
- Demonym: Mainer

Language
  - Official language: None
  - Spoken language: English: 92.91%; French: 3.93% (Note: Maine is the U.S. state with the highest percentage of French-speaking population.); Other: ≤ 3.16%
- Time zone: UTC−05:00 (Eastern)
  - Summer (DST): UTC−04:00 (EDT)
- USPS abbreviation: ME
- ISO 3166 code: US-ME
- Traditional abbreviation: Me.
- Latitude: 42° 58′ N to 47° 28′ N
- Longitude: 66° 57′ W to 71° 5′ W (45°N 69°W)
- Website: maine.gov

State symbols of Maine
List of state symbols
- Flag of Maine

- Seal of Maine

- Coat of arms of Maine
- Motto: Dirigo
- Slogan: The Way Life Should Be
- Song: "State of Maine"; "The Dirigo March"; "The Ballad of the 20th Maine"

Living insignia
- Bird: Black-capped chickadee
- Butterfly: Pink-edged Sulphur
- Cat breed: Maine Coon
- Crustacean: Lobster
- Fish: Landlocked Atlantic salmon
- Flower: White pine cone and tassel
- Fruit: Wild blueberry
- Insect: Honey bee
- Mammal: Moose
- Plant: Wintergreen
- Tree: White pine

Inanimate insignia
- Beverage: Moxie
- Food: Blueberry pie Whoopie pie
- Fossil: Pertica quadrifaria
- Gemstone: Tourmaline
- Rock: Granitic pegmatite
- Ship: Bowdoin
- Soil: Chesuncook soil

State route marker

State quarter
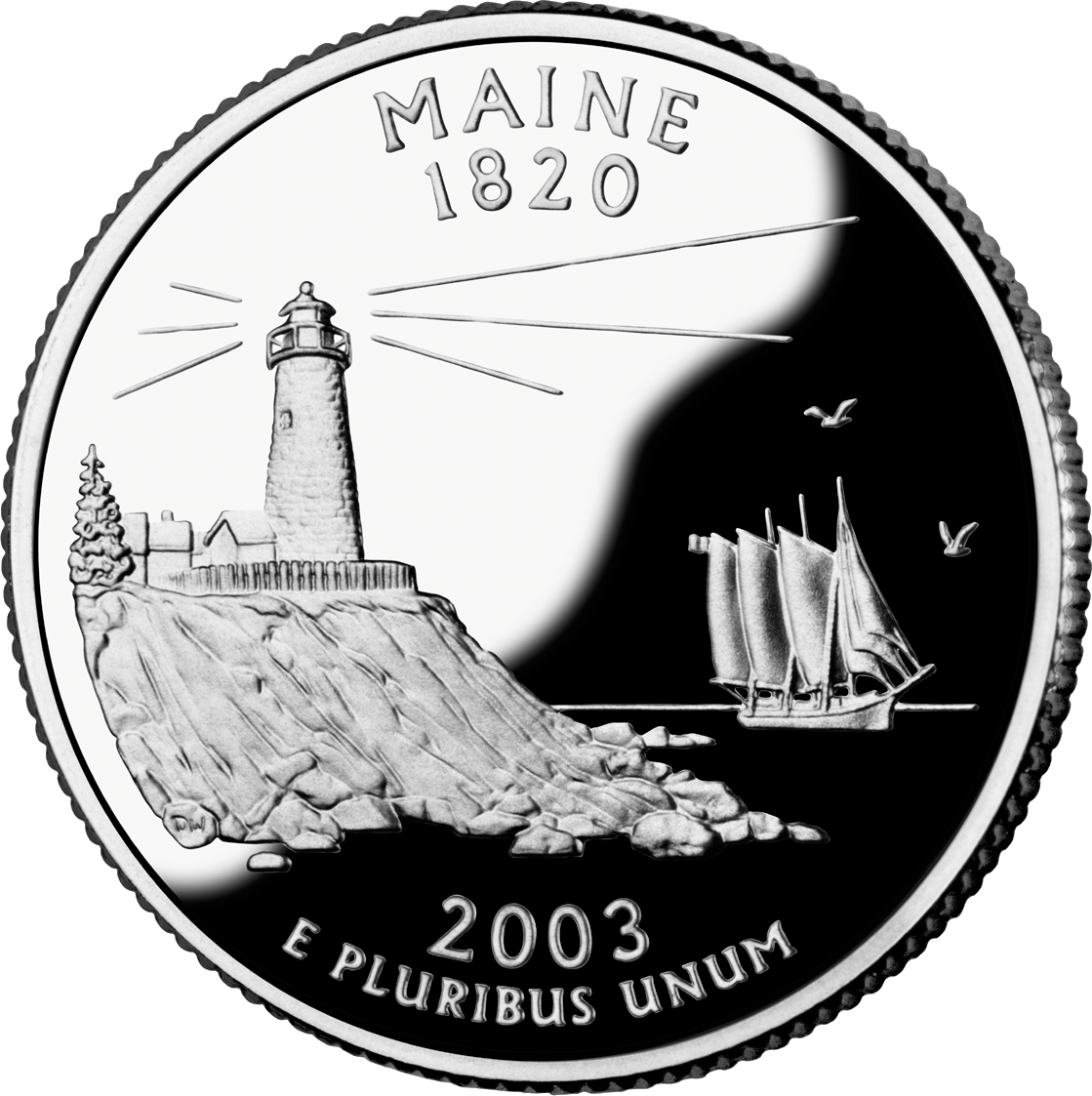
- Released in 2003

Maine (/meɪn/ MAYN) is a state in the New England region of the United States, and the northeasternmost state in the contiguous United States. It borders New Hampshire to the west, the Gulf of Maine to the southeast, and the Canadian provinces of New Brunswick and Quebec to the northeast and northwest, and shares a maritime border with Nova Scotia. It is the only state to border only one other state (New Hampshire). Maine is the largest state in New England by total area, almost as large as the combined area of the remaining five states. Of the 50 U.S. states, it is the 12th-smallest by area, the 9th-least populous, the 13th-least densely populated, and the most rural. As of 2024, Maine's population stood at a Census-estimated 1,400,000, the state's highest-ever population estimate. Maine's capital is Augusta, while its most populous city is Portland.

The territory of Maine has been inhabited by Indigenous populations for about 12,000 years, after the glaciers retreated during the last ice age. At the time of European arrival, several Algonquian-speaking nations governed the area and these nations are now known as the Wabanaki Confederacy. The first European settlement in the area was by the French in 1604 on Saint Croix Island, founded by Pierre Dugua, Sieur de Mons. The first English settlement was the short-lived Popham Colony, established by the Plymouth Company in 1607. A number of Irish and English settlements were established along the coast of Maine in the 1620s, although the rugged climate and conflict with the local Indigenous people and the French caused many to fail. Maine experienced significant warfare during the 17th century. As Maine entered the 18th century, only a half dozen European settlements had survived.

Loyalist and Patriot forces contended for Maine's territory during the American Revolution. During the War of 1812, the largely undefended eastern region of Maine was occupied by British forces with the goal of annexing it to Canada via the Colony of New Ireland, but returned to the United States following failed British offensives on the northern border, mid-Atlantic and south which produced a peace treaty that restored the pre-war boundaries. Maine was part of the Commonwealth of Massachusetts until 1820 when it voted to secede from Massachusetts to become a separate state. On March 15, 1820, under the Missouri Compromise, Maine was admitted to the Union as the 23rd state.

Maine is known for its jagged, rocky Atlantic Ocean and bay-shore coastlines, mountains, heavily forested interior, and its cuisine, particularly wild lowbush blueberries and seafood such as lobster and clams. Coastal and Down East Maine have emerged as important centers for the creative economy, especially in the vicinity of Portland, which has also brought gentrification to the city and its metropolitan area.

== History ==
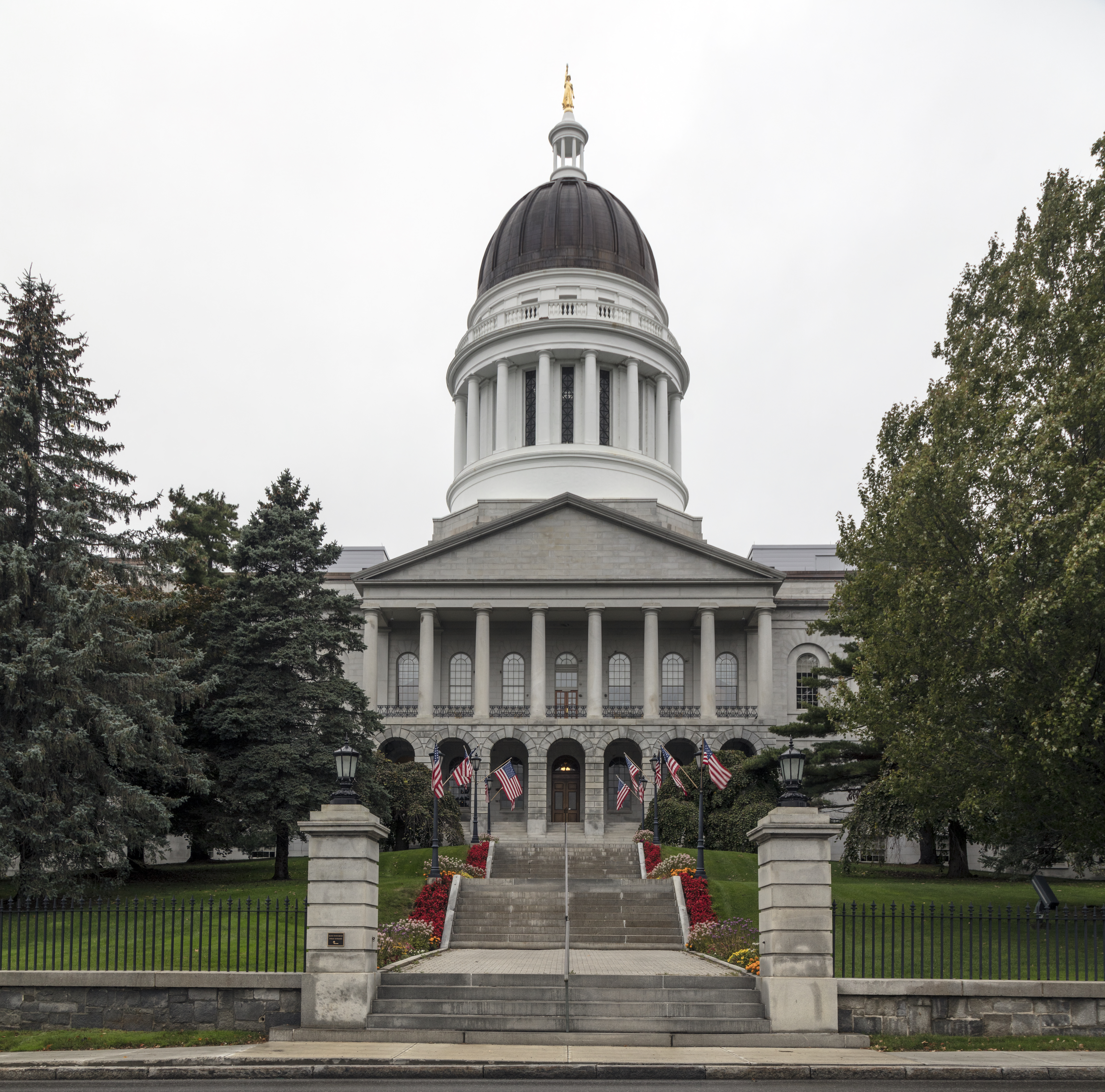
Maine State House, designed by Charles Bulfinch, built 1829–1832

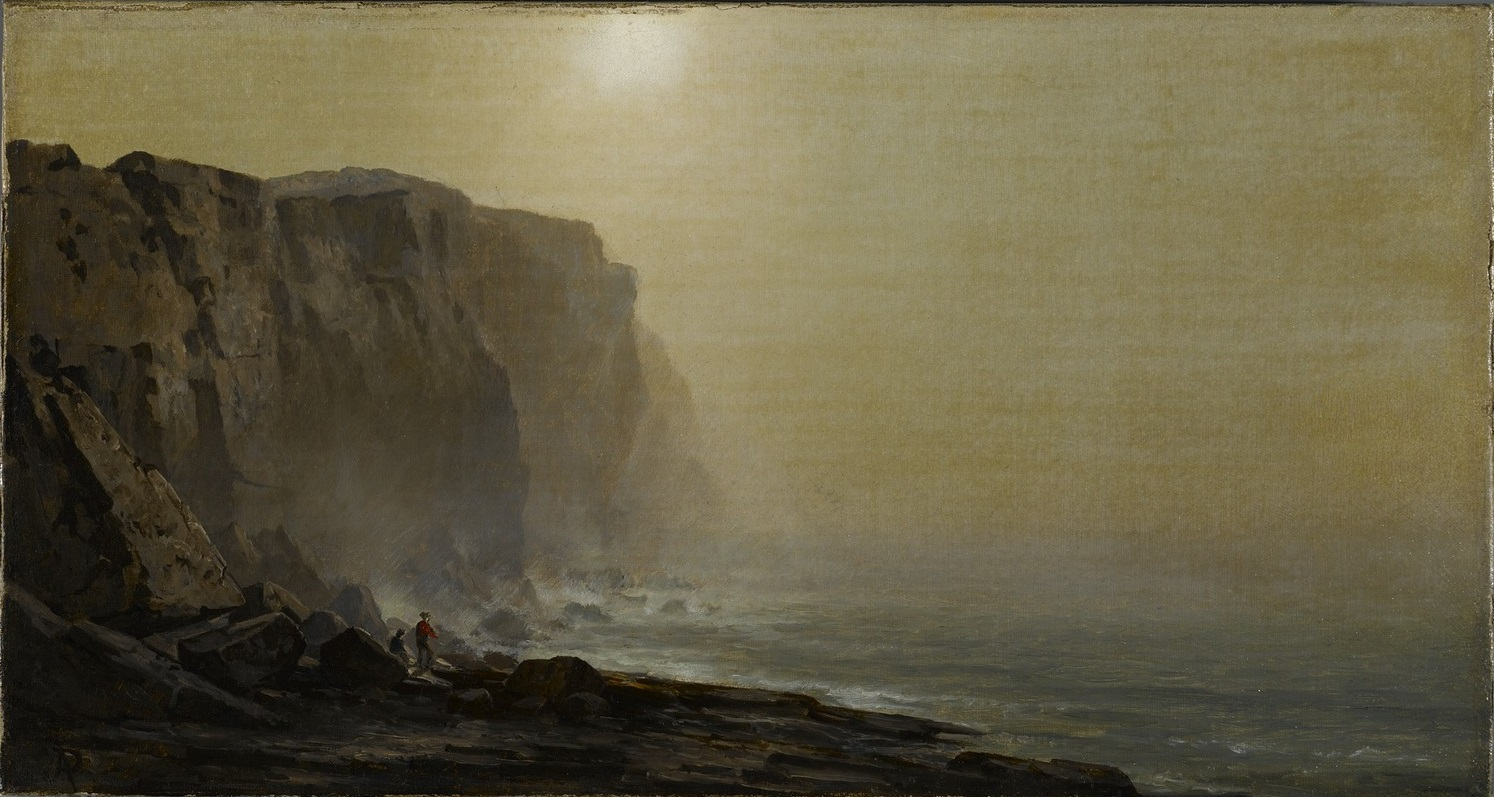
Misty Morning, Coast of Maine Arthur Parton (1842–1914). Between 1865 and 1870, Brooklyn Museum.

The earliest known inhabitants of the territory that is now Maine were Algonquian-speaking Wabanaki peoples, including the Passamaquoddy, Maliseet, Penobscot, Androscoggin, and Kennebec. During the later King Philip's War, many of these peoples would merge in one form or another to become the Wabanaki Confederacy, aiding the Wampanoag of Massachusetts and the Mahican of New York. Afterwards, many of these people were driven from their natural territories, but most of Maine's tribes continued, unchanged, until the American Revolution. Before this point, however, most of these people were considered separate nations. Many had adapted to living in permanent, Haudenosaunee-inspired settlements, while those along the coast tended to move from summer villages to winter villages on a yearly cycle. They would usually winter inland and head to the coasts by summer.

European contact with what is now called Maine may have started around 1000 CE when Vikings are believed to have interacted with the native Penobscot in present-day Hancock County, most likely through trade. If confirmed, this would make Maine the site of the earliest European appearance in the entire US. About 200 years earlier, from the settlements in Iceland and Greenland, the Norse first identified America and attempted to settle areas such as Newfoundland, but failed to establish a permanent settlement. Archeological evidence suggests that Vikings in Greenland returned to North America for several centuries after the initial discovery to trade and collect timber, with the most relevant evidence being the Maine Penny, an 11th-century Norwegian coin found at a Native American dig site in 1954.

The first European confirmed settlement in modern-day Maine was in 1604 on Saint Croix Island, led by French explorer Pierre Dugua, Sieur de Mons. His party included Samuel de Champlain, noted as an explorer. The French named the entire area Acadia, including the portion that later became the state of Maine. (It is possible that they named the region Maine after the French province; however, debate exists as to the origin of the name of the state.) The Plymouth Company established the first English settlement in Maine at the Popham Colony in 1607, the same year as the settlement at Jamestown, Virginia. The Popham colonists returned to Britain after 14 months.

The French established two Jesuit missions: one on Penobscot Bay in 1609, and the other on Mount Desert Island in 1613. The same year, Claude de La Tour established Castine. In 1625, Charles de Saint-Étienne de la Tour erected Fort Pentagouet to protect Castine. The coastal areas of eastern Maine first became the Province of Maine in a 1622 land patent. The part of western Maine north of the Kennebec River was more sparsely settled and was known in the 17th century as the Territory of Sagadahock. A second settlement was attempted in 1623 by English explorer and naval Captain Christopher Levett at a place called York, where he had been granted 6,000 acres (24 km^{2}) by King Charles I of England. It also failed.

The 1622 patent of the Province of Maine was split at the Piscataqua River into the Province of New Hampshire to the south and New Somersetshire to the north. A disputed 1630 patent split off the area around present-day Saco as Lygonia. Justifying its actions with a 1652 geographic survey that showed an overlapping patent, the Massachusetts Bay Colony had seized New Somersetshire and Lygonia by force by 1658. The Territory of Sagadahock between the Kennebec River and St. Croix River notionally became Cornwall County, Province of New York under a 1664 grant from Charles II of England to his brother James, at the time the Duke of York. Some of this land was claimed by New France as part of Acadia. All of the English settlements in the Massachusetts Bay Colony and the Province of New York became part of the Dominion of New England in 1686. All of present-day Maine was unified as York County, Massachusetts under a 1691 royal patent for the Province of Massachusetts Bay.

Central Maine was formerly inhabited by the Androscoggin tribe of the Abenaki nation, also known as Arosaguntacook. They were driven out of the area in 1690 during King William's War. They were relocated to St. Francis, Canada, which was destroyed by Rogers' Rangers in 1759, and is now Odanak. The other Abenaki tribes suffered several severe defeats, particularly during Dummer's War, with the capture of Norridgewock in 1724 and the defeat of the Pequawket in 1725, which significantly reduced their numbers. They finally withdrew to Canada, where they were settled at Bécancour and Sillery, and later at St. Francis, along with other refugee tribes from the south.

Maine was much fought over by the French, English, and allied natives during the 17th and 18th centuries. These natives conducted raids against settlers and each other, taking captives for ransom or, in some cases, kidnapped for adoption by native tribes. A notable example was the early 1692 Abenaki raid on York, where about 100 English settlers were killed and another estimated 80 taken hostage. The Abenaki took captives taken during raids of Massachusetts in Queen Anne's War of the early 1700s to Kahnewake, a Catholic Mohawk village near Montreal, where some were adopted and others ransomed.

After the British defeated the French in Acadia in the 1740s, the territory from the Penobscot River east fell under the nominal authority of the Province of Nova Scotia, and together with present-day New Brunswick formed the Nova Scotia county of Sunbury, with its court of general sessions at Campobello. American and British forces contended for Maine's territory during the American Revolution and the War of 1812, with the British occupying eastern Maine in both conflicts via the Colony of New Ireland. The territory of Maine was confirmed as part of Massachusetts when the United States was formed following the Treaty of Paris ending the revolution, although the final border with British North America was not established until the Webster–Ashburton Treaty of 1842.

Maine was physically separate from the rest of Massachusetts. Longstanding disagreements over land speculation and settlements led to Maine residents and their allies in Massachusetts proper forcing an 1807 vote in the Massachusetts Assembly on permitting Maine to secede; the vote failed. Secessionist sentiment in Maine was stoked during the War of 1812 when Massachusetts pro-British merchants opposed the war and refused to defend Maine from British invaders. In 1819, Massachusetts agreed to permit secession, sanctioned by voters of the rapidly growing region the following year.

=== Statehood and Missouri Compromise ===
Formal secession from Massachusetts and admission of Maine as the 23rd state occurred on March 15, 1820, as part of the Missouri Compromise, which geographically restricted the spread of slavery and enabled the admission to statehood of Missouri the following year, keeping a balance between slave and free states.

Maine's original state capital was Portland, Maine's largest city, until it was moved to the more central Augusta in 1832. The principal office of the Maine Supreme Judicial Court remains in Portland.

The 20th Maine Volunteer Infantry Regiment, under the command of Colonel Joshua Lawrence Chamberlain, prevented the Union Army from being flanked at Little Round Top by the Confederate Army during the Battle of Gettysburg.

Four U.S. Navy ships have been named USS Maine, most famously the armored cruiser USS Maine (ACR-1), whose sinking by an explosion on February 15, 1898, precipitated the Spanish–American War.

=== Political history ===
Many notable politicians have shaped the history of Maine, including many notable senators. During the 19th century, Hannibal Hamlin, who served as Senator and briefly Governor, was the running mate of Republican, Abraham Lincoln, and served one term as vice-president from 1861 to 1865 before being replaced by Andrew Johnson of Tennessee, while Senator and Congressman, James G. Blaine, nicknamed the "Plumed Knight", served many top positions such as Speaker of the House and Secretary of State. He was the major Republican candidate in the 1884 United States presidential election, losing narrowly to Grover Cleveland. In the 20th century, Republican, Margaret Chase Smith made history as the first woman to serve in both the House and Senate, when elected in 1948. In 1950, she delivered her famed Declaration of Conscience speech, that defended civil liberties in the wake of McCarthyism, while Democrat Edmund Muskie, who served as Governor and Senator, was the running mate of vice-president incumbent, Hubert Humphrey in 1968 United States presidential election and briefly served as Secretary of State in 1980 under Jimmy Carter.

== Geography ==
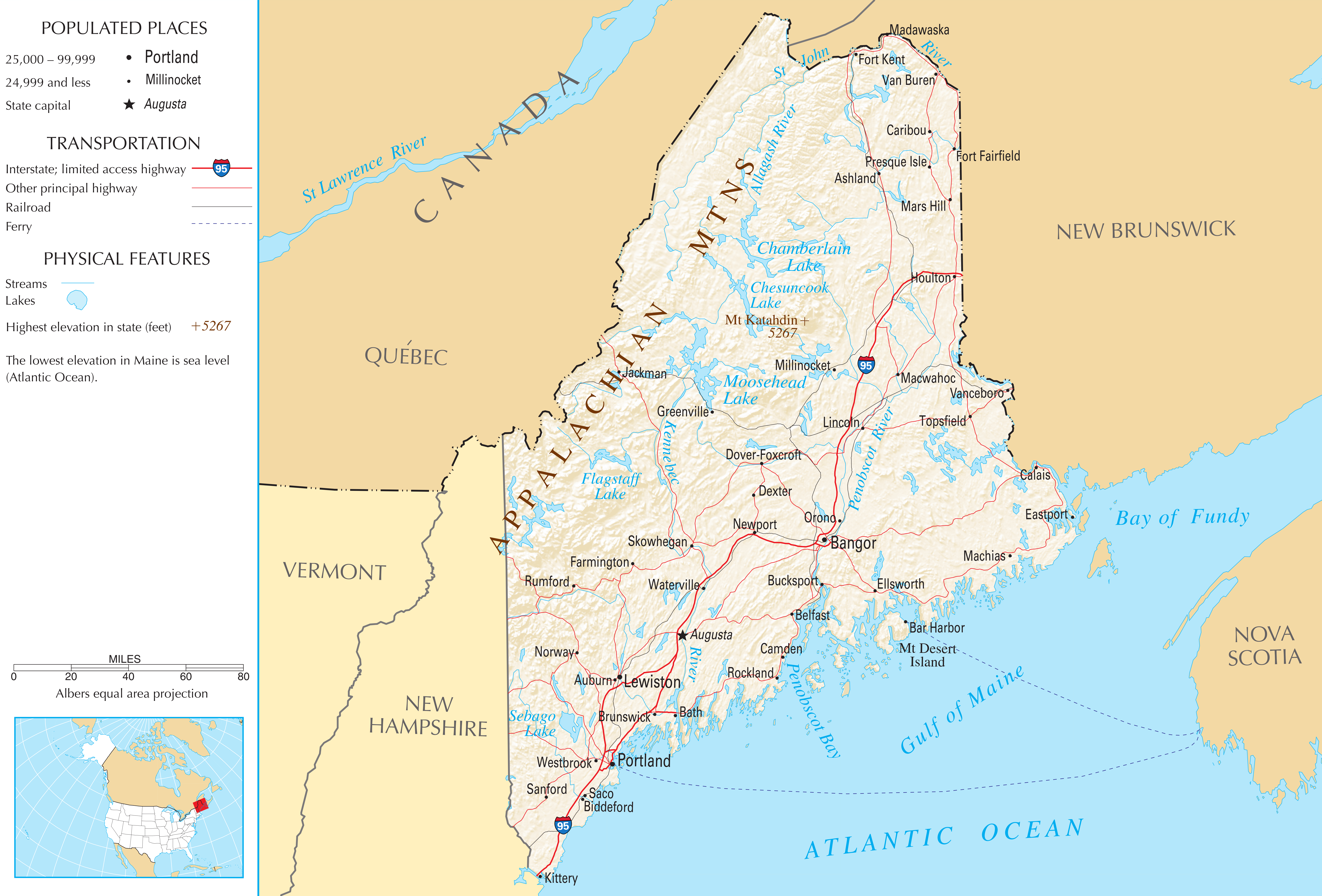
A map of Maine showing its famed jagged coast

To the south and east is the Gulf of Maine, and to the west is the state of New Hampshire. The Canadian province of New Brunswick is to the north and northeast, and the province of Quebec is to the northwest. Maine is the northernmost and largest state in New England, accounting for almost half of the region's entire land area. Maine is the only state to border exactly one other American state. Approximately half the area of Maine lies on each side of the 45th parallel north in latitude.

Maine is the easternmost state in the contiguous United States both in its extreme points and its geographic center. The town of Lubec is the easternmost organized settlement in the United States. Its Quoddy Head Lighthouse is also the closest place in the United States to Africa and Europe. Estcourt Station is Maine's northernmost point, as well as the northernmost point in New England. (For more information see extreme points of the United States)

Maine's Moosehead Lake is the largest lake wholly in New England, since Lake Champlain is located between Vermont, New York, and Quebec. A number of other Maine lakes, such as South Twin Lake, are described by Thoreau in The Maine Woods (1864). Mount Katahdin is the northern terminus of the Appalachian Trail, which extends southerly to Springer Mountain, Georgia, and the southern terminus of the new International Appalachian Trail which, when complete, will run to Belle Isle, Newfoundland and Labrador.

Machias Seal Island and North Rock, off the state's Downeast coast, are claimed by both Canada and the Maine town of Cutler, and are within one of four areas between the two countries whose sovereignty is still in dispute, but it is the only one of the disputed areas containing land. Also in this easternmost area in the Bay of Fundy is the Old Sow, the largest tidal whirlpool in the Western Hemisphere.

Maine is the least densely populated state east of the Mississippi River. It is called the Pine Tree State due to its largest distribution and presence of pine, including Pinus strobus and Pinus resinosa. Over 80% of its total area is forested or unclaimed, the most forest cover of any U.S. state. In the wooded areas of the interior lies much uninhabited land, some of which does not have formal political organization into local units (a rarity in New England). The Northwest Aroostook unorganized territory in the northern part of the state, for example, has an area of 2,668 square miles (6,910 km^{2}) and a population of 10, or one person for every 267 square miles (690 km^{2}).

Maine is in the temperate broadleaf and mixed forests biome. The land near the southern and central Atlantic coast is covered by the mixed oaks of the Northeastern coastal forests. The remainder of the state, including the North Woods, is covered by the New England–Acadian forests.

Maine has almost 230 miles (400 km) of ocean coastline (and 3,500 miles (5,600 km) of tidal coastline). West Quoddy Head in Lubec is the easternmost point of land in the 48 contiguous states. Along the famous rock-bound coast of Maine are lighthouses, beaches, fishing villages, and thousands of offshore islands, including the Isles of Shoals which straddle the New Hampshire border. There are jagged rocks and cliffs and many bays and inlets. Inland are lakes, rivers, forests, and mountains. This visual contrast of forested slopes sweeping down to the sea has been summed up by American poet Edna St. Vincent Millay of Rockland and Camden, in "Renascence":

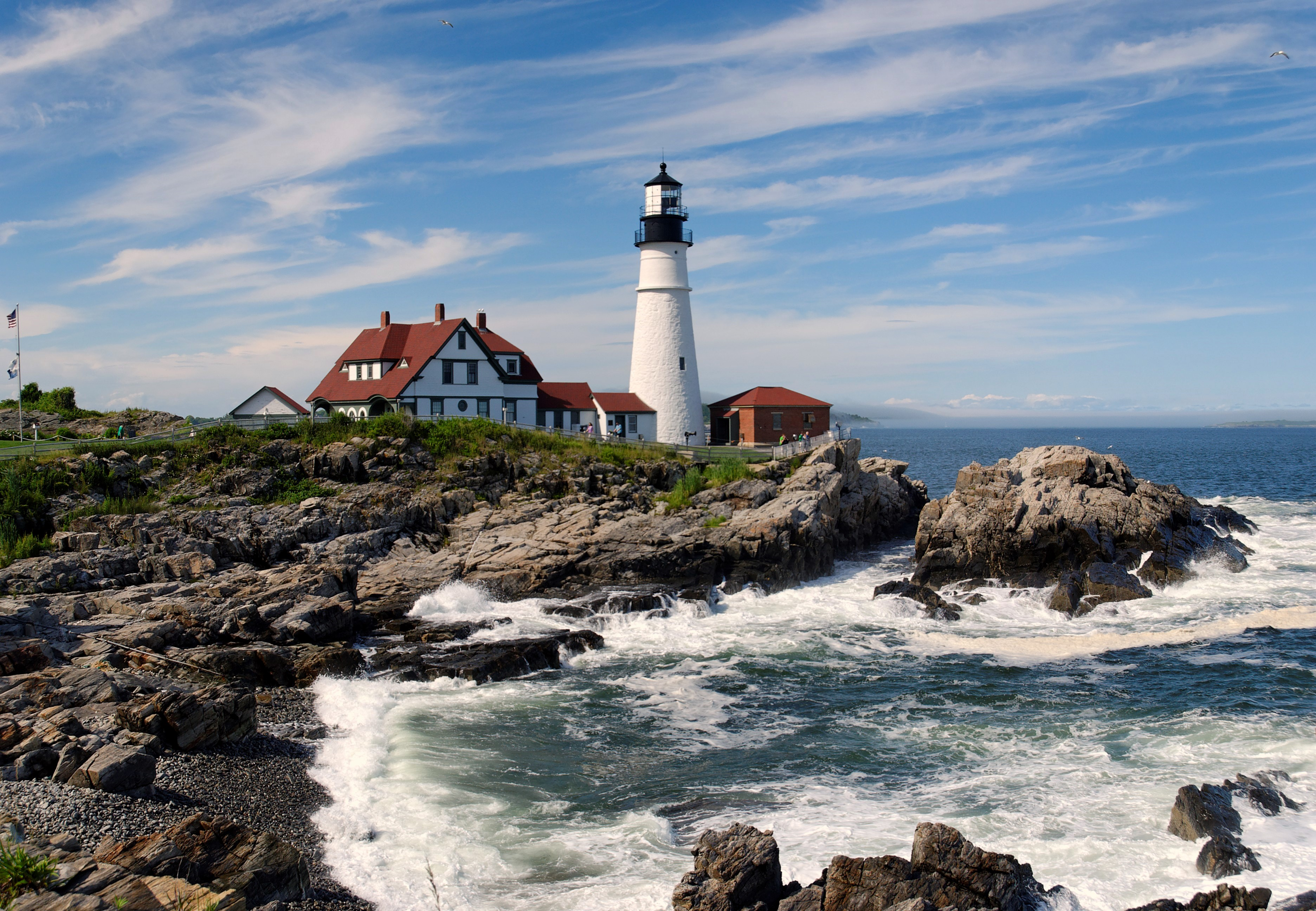
The Maine coast and Portland Head Light

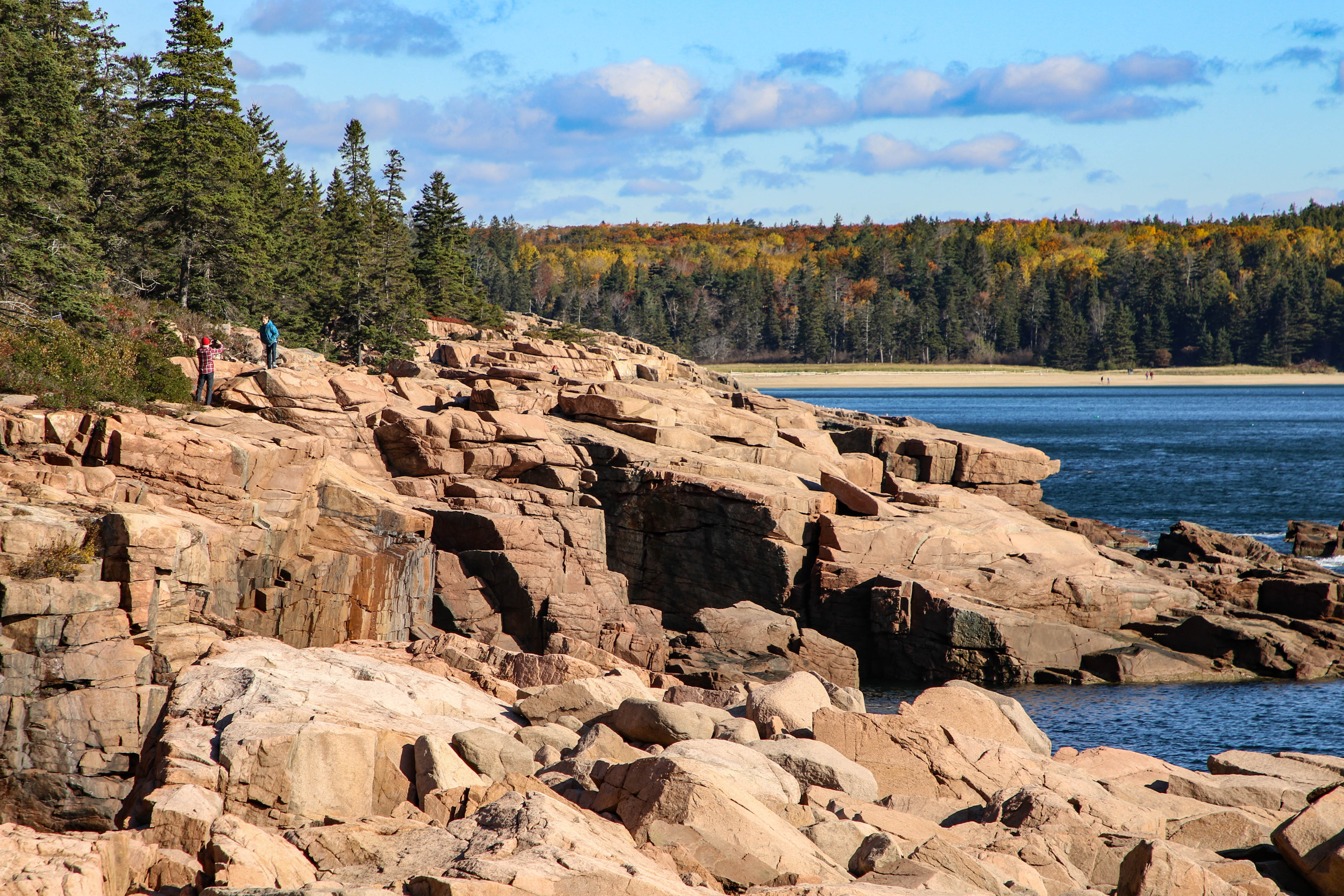
Rocky shoreline in Acadia National Park

All I could see from where I stood
Was three long mountains and a wood;
I turned and looked the other way,
And saw three islands in a bay.

— Edna St. Vincent Millay, Renascence

Geologists describe this type of landscape as a "drowned coast", where a rising sea level has invaded former land features, creating bays out of valleys and islands out of mountain tops. A rise in land elevation due to the melting of heavy glacier ice caused a slight rebounding effect of underlying rock; this land rise, however, was not enough to eliminate all the effect of the rising sea level and its invasion of former land features.

Much of Maine's geomorphology was created by extended glacial activity at the end of the last ice age. Prominent glacial features include Somes Sound and Bubble Rock, both part of Acadia National Park on Mount Desert Island. Carved by glaciers, Somes Sound reaches depths of 175 feet (50 m). The extreme depth and steep drop-off allow large ships to navigate almost the entire length of the sound. These features also have made it attractive for boat builders, such as the prestigious Hinckley Yachts.

Bubble Rock, a glacial erratic, is a large boulder perched on the edge of Bubble Mountain in Acadia National Park. By analyzing the type of granite, geologists discovered that glaciers carried Bubble Rock to its present location from near Lucerne, 30 miles (48 km) away. The Iapetus Suture runs through the north and west of the state, being underlain by the ancient Laurentian terrane, and the south and east underlain by the Avalonian terrane.

Acadia National Park is the only national park in New England. Areas under the protection and management of the National Park Service include:

- Acadia National Park near Bar Harbor
- Appalachian National Scenic Trail
- Maine Acadian Culture in St. John Valley
- Roosevelt Campobello International Park on Campobello Island in New Brunswick, Canada, operated by both the U.S. and Canada, just across the Franklin Delano Roosevelt Bridge from Lubec
- Saint Croix Island International Historic Site at Calais
- Katahdin Woods and Waters National Monument

Lands under the control of the state of Maine include:

- Maine State Parks
- Maine Wildlife Management Areas (WMA)

=== Climate ===
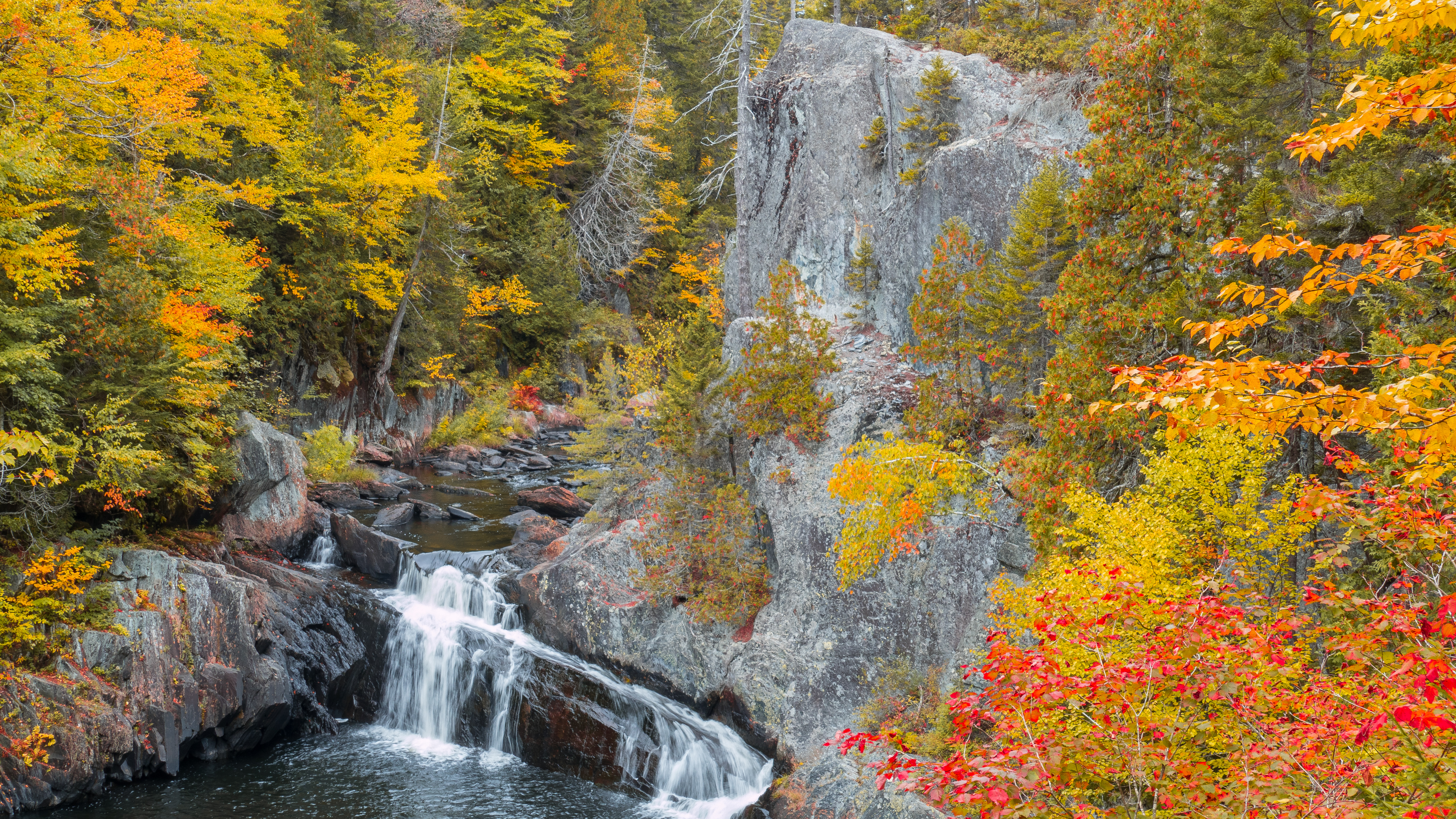
Autumn in the Hundred-Mile Wilderness

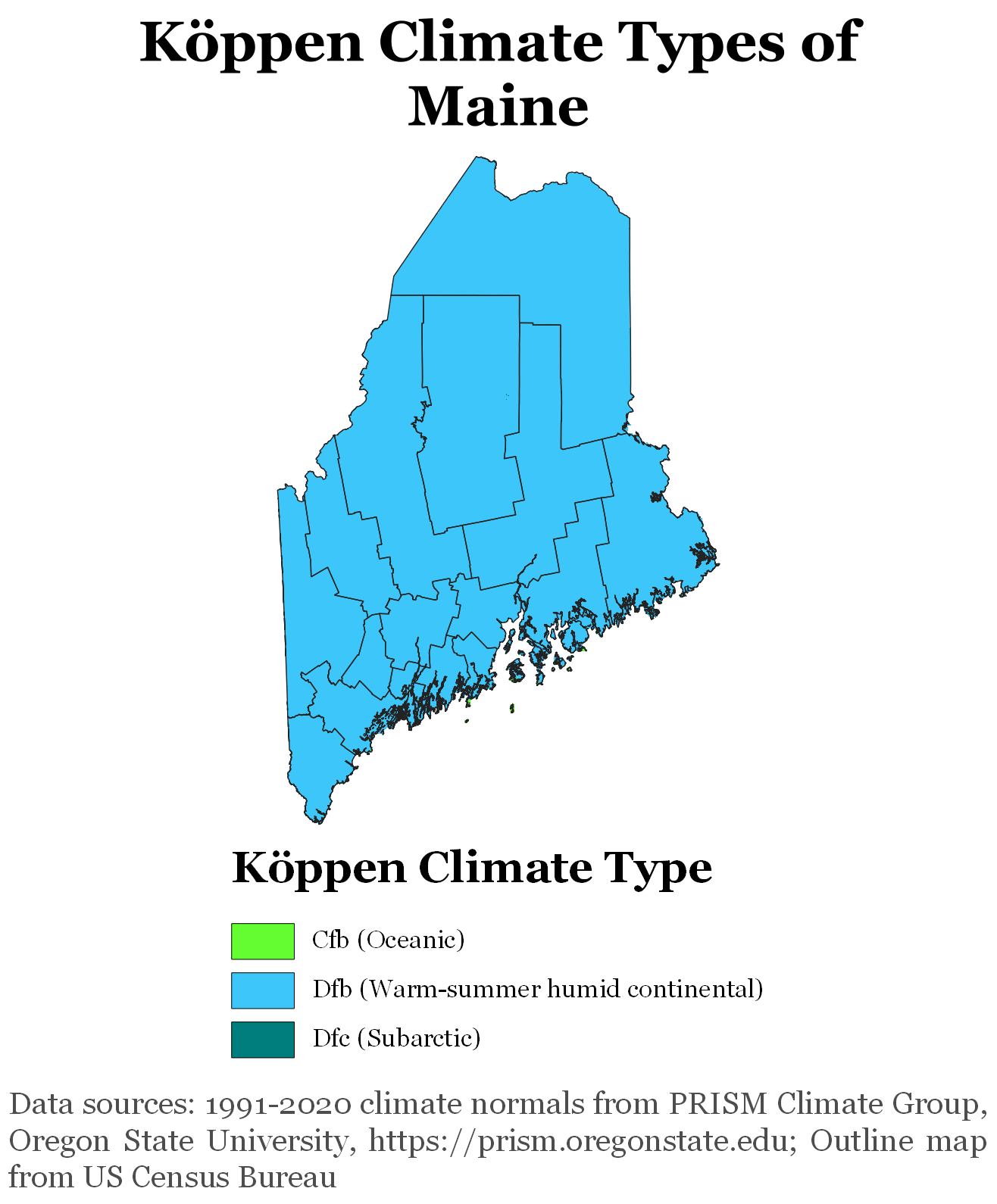
Köppen climate types of Maine, using 1991–2020 climate normals

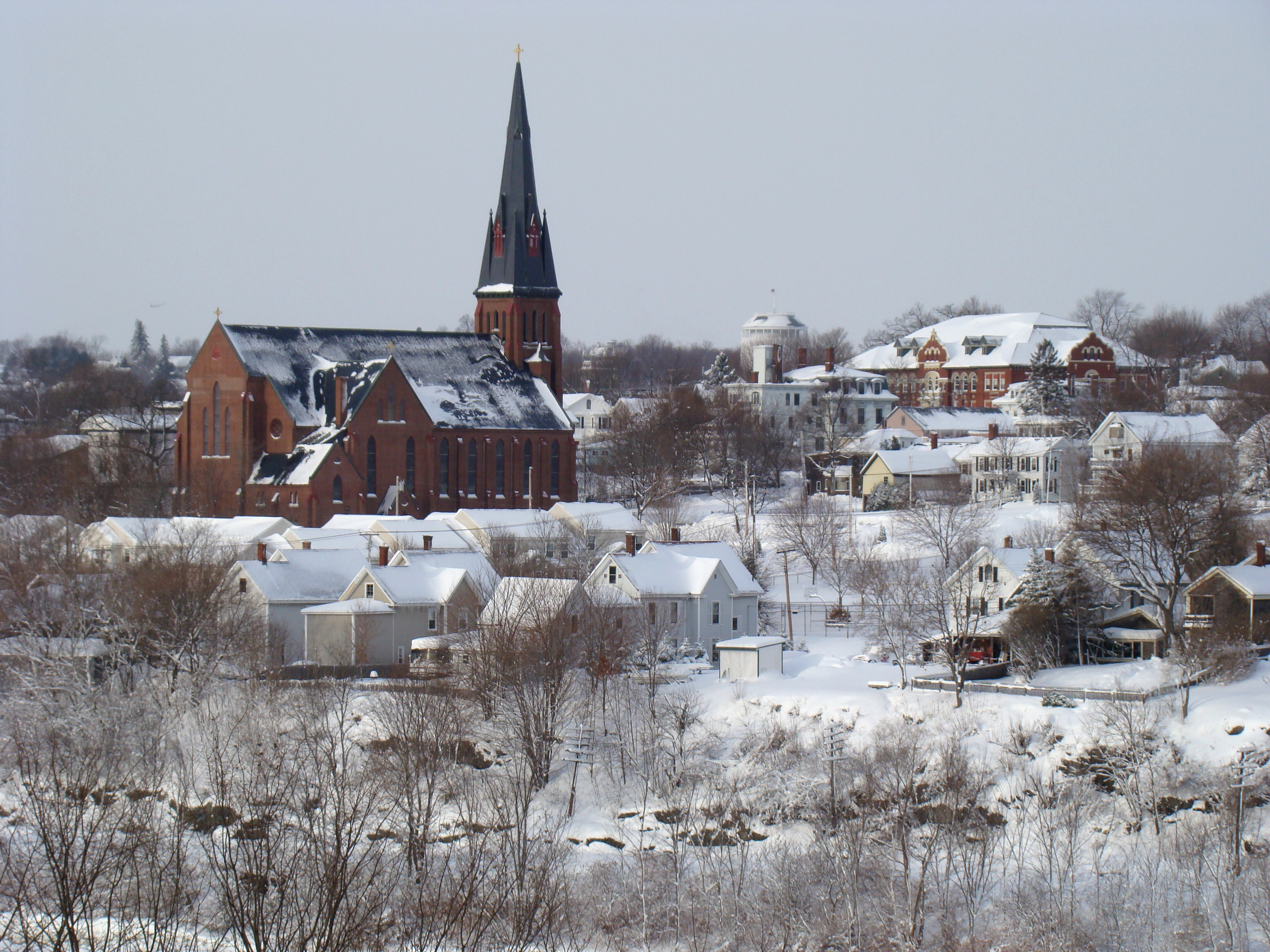
Winter in Bangor

Maine has a humid continental climate (Köppen climate classification Dfb), with warm and sometimes humid summers, and long, cold and very snowy winters. Winters are especially severe in the northern and western parts of Maine, while coastal areas are moderated slightly by the Atlantic Ocean, resulting in marginally milder winters and cooler summers than inland regions. Daytime highs are generally in the 75–85 °F (24–29 °C) range throughout the state in July, with overnight lows in the high 50s °F (around 15 °C). January temperatures range from highs near 30 °F (−1 °C) on the southern coast to overnight lows averaging below 0 °F (−18 °C) in the far north.

The state's record high temperature is 105 °F (41 °C), set in July 1911, at North Bridgton. Precipitation in Maine is evenly distributed year-round, but with a slight summer maximum in northern/northwestern Maine and a slight late-fall or early-winter maximum along the coast due to "nor'easters" or intense cold-season rain and snowstorms. In coastal Maine, the late spring and summer months are usually driest—a rarity across the Eastern United States. Maine has fewer days of thunderstorms than any other state east of the Rockies, with most of the state averaging fewer than twenty days of thunderstorms a year. Tornadoes are rare in Maine, with the state averaging two per year, although this number is increasing. Most severe thunderstorms and tornadoes occur in the southwestern interior portion of the state, where summer temperatures are often the warmest and the atmosphere is thus more unstable compared to northern and coastal areas. Maine rarely sees the direct landfall of tropical cyclones, as they tend to recurve out to sea or are rapidly weakening by the time they reach the cooler waters of Maine.

In January 2009, a new record low temperature for the state was set at Big Black River of −50 °F (−46 °C), tying the New England record.

Annual precipitation varies from 35.8 in (909 mm) in Presque Isle to 56.7 in (1,441 mm) in Acadia National Park.

Average daily maximum and minimum temperatures for selected cities in Maine
Location	July (°F)	July (°C)	January (°F)	January (°C)
Portland	78/59	26/15	31/13	−0/−10
Lewiston	81/61	27/16	29/11	−2/−12
Bangor	79/57	26/14	27/6	−2/−14
Augusta	79/60	26/15	27/11	−2/−11
Presque Isle	77/55	25/13	20/1	−6/−17

=== Flora and fauna ===
Maine exhibits a diverse range of flora and fauna across its varied landscapes, including forests, coastline, and wetlands. Forested areas consist primarily of coniferous and deciduous trees, such as balsam fir, sugar maple, and its state tree, the Eastern white pine. Coastal regions are characterized by hardy sea milkwort, sea-blight, bayberry, and the invasive rugosa rose.

Maine's terrestrial fauna comprises mammals such as moose, black bears, and white-tailed deer, along with smaller species like red squirrels, snowshoe hares, and raccoons. Maine has the largest populations of moose and black bears in the contiguous United States. Avian diversity is evident with migratory birds like piping plovers, American oystercatcher, and northern harrier, as well as resident species like black-capped chickadees, blue jays, and barred owls. Wetlands provide habitat for amphibians such as spotted salamanders, wood frogs, and toads. Freshwater habitats support fish species like brook trout, landlocked salmon, and multiple gamefish. The rivers of central and eastern Maine are home to the US' last remaining wild populations of Atlantic salmon (Salmo salar). Marine life in offshore waters includes Atlantic puffins, harbor seals, minke whales, and lobster. Maine's abundance of lobster makes the state the largest producer of lobster in the United States.

== Demographics ==
=== Population ===
Historical population
Census	Pop.	Note	%±
1790	96,540		—
1800	151,719		57.2%
1810	228,705		50.7%
1820	298,335		30.4%
1830	399,455		33.9%
1840	501,793		25.6%
1850	583,169		16.2%
1860	628,279		7.7%
1870	626,915		−0.2%
1880	648,936		3.5%
1890	661,086		1.9%
1900	694,466		5.0%
1910	742,371		6.9%
1920	768,014		3.5%
1930	797,423		3.8%
1940	847,226		6.2%
1950	913,774		7.9%
1960	969,265		6.1%
1970	992,048		2.4%
1980	1,124,660		13.4%
1990	1,227,928		9.2%
2000	1,274,923		3.8%
2010	1,328,361		4.2%
2020	1,362,359		2.6%
2025 (est.)	1,414,874		3.9%
Source: 1910–2020

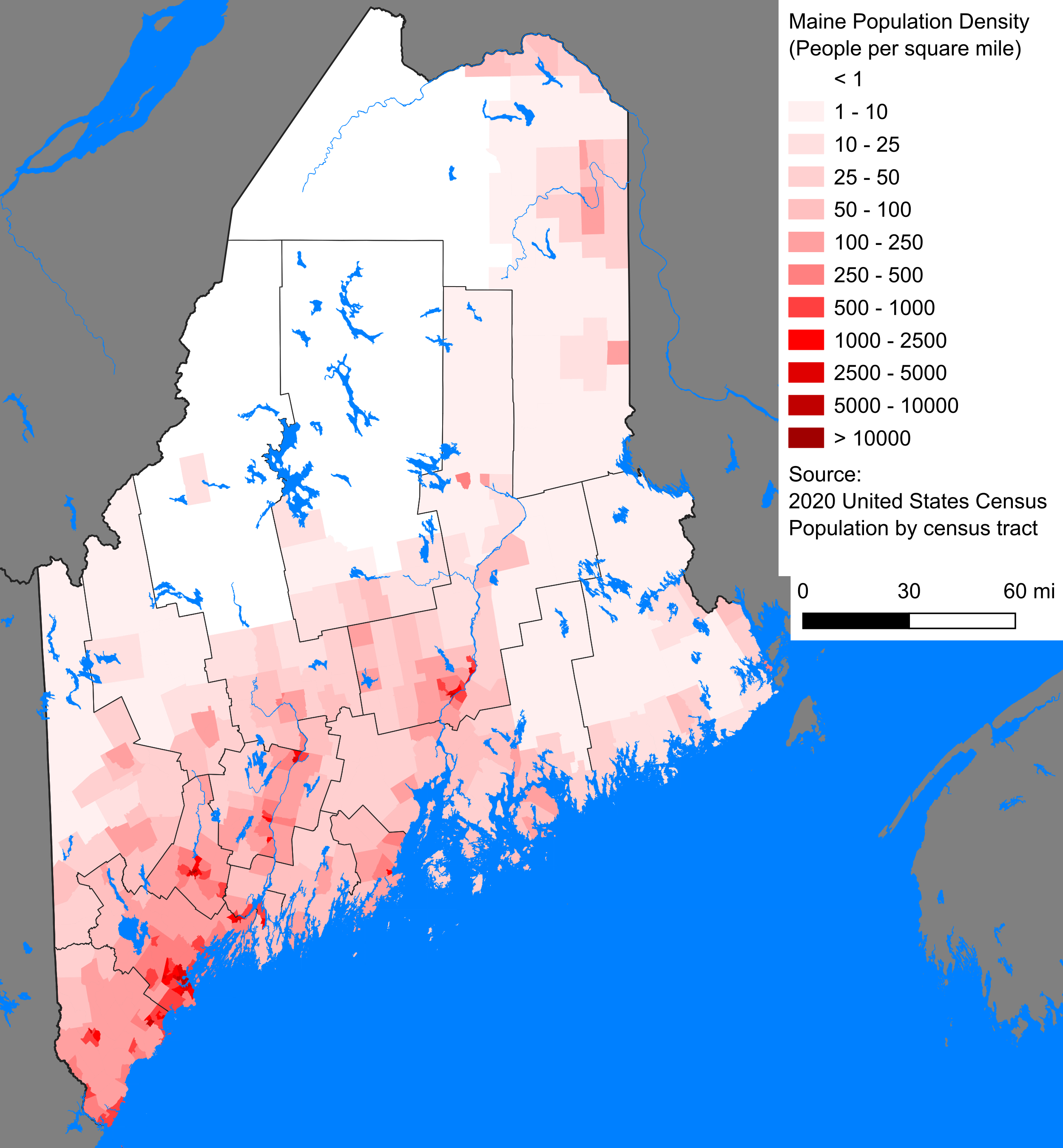
Maine population density map

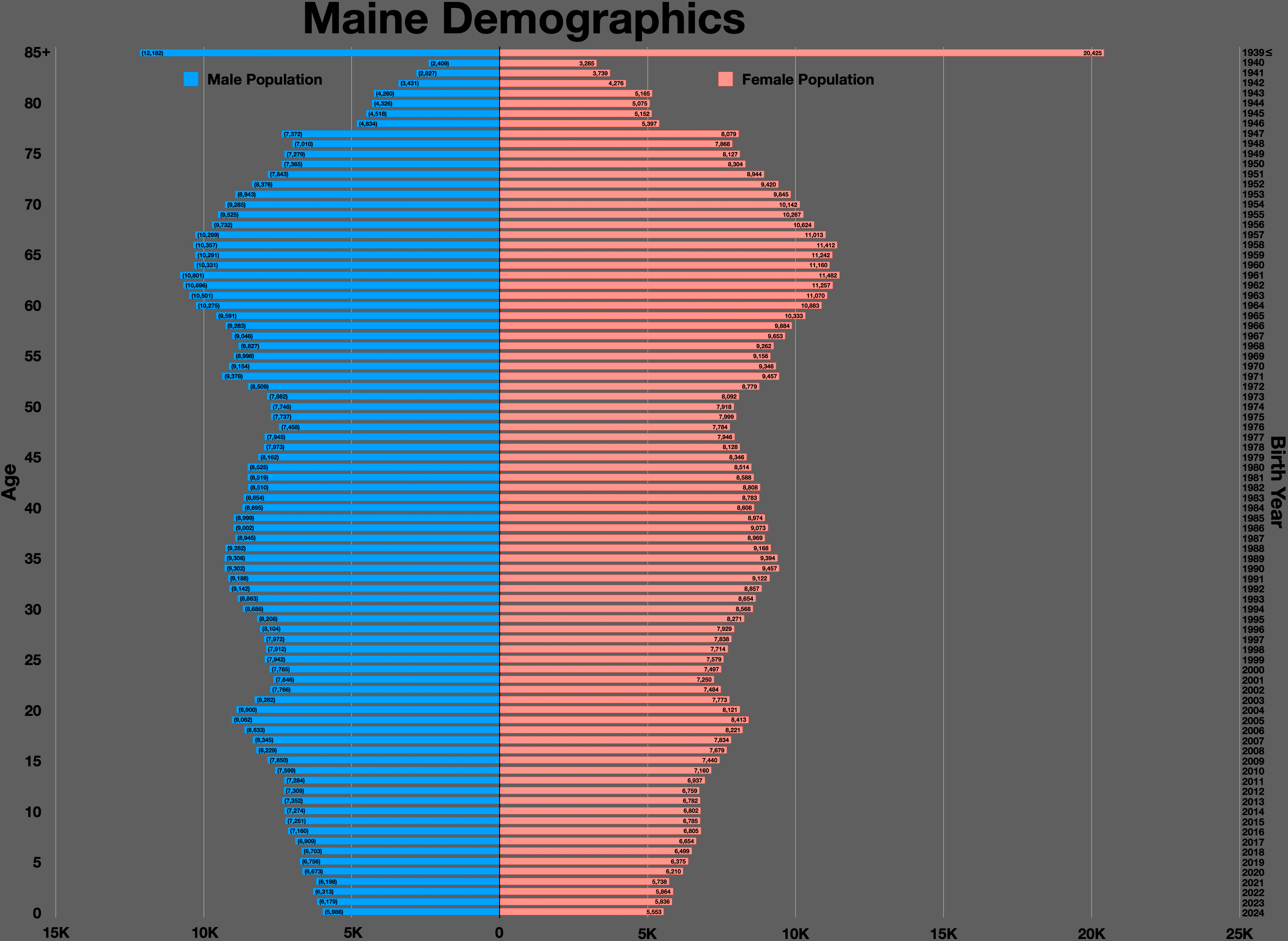
Maine population pyramid

The U.S. Census Bureau estimates that the population of Maine was 1,344,212 on July 1, 2019, a 1.19% increase since the 2010 United States census. At the 2020 census, 1,362,359 people lived in the state. The state's population density is 41.3 people per square mile, making it the least densely populated state east of the Mississippi River. As of 2010, Maine was also the most rural state in the Union, with only 38.7% of the state's population living within urban areas. As explained in detail under "Geography", there are large tracts of uninhabited land in some remote parts of the interior of the state, particularly in the North Maine Woods.

The mean population center of Maine is located in Kennebec County, just east of Augusta. The Greater Portland metropolitan area is the most densely populated with nearly 40% of Maine's population. This area spans three counties and includes many farms and wooded areas; the 2016 population of Portland proper was 66,937.

Maine has experienced a very slow rate of population growth since the 1990 census; its rate of growth (0.57%) since the 2010 census ranks 45th of the 50 states. In 2021 and 2022, however, Maine had the highest proportion of arriving residents to departing residents of any state in the country, with 1.8 arrivals for every departure. The modest population growth in the state has been concentrated in the southern coastal counties; with more diverse populations slowly moving into these areas of the state. However, the northern, more rural areas of the state have experienced a slight decline in population from 2010 to 2016.

As of 2020, Maine has the highest population age 65 or older in the United States.

According to the 2010 census, Maine has the highest percentage of Non-Hispanic whites of any state, at 94.4% of the total population. In 2011, 89.0% of all births in the state were to non-Hispanic white parents. Maine also has the second-highest residential senior population.

According to HUD's 2022 Annual Homeless Assessment Report, there were an estimated 4,411 homeless people in Maine.

=== Race and ethnicity ===
The table below shows the racial and ethnic composition of Maine's population as of 2016.

Maine racial and ethnic composition of population
Race	Population (2016 est.)	Percentage
Total population	1,329,923	100%
White	1,260,476	94.8%
Black or African American	16,303	1.2%
American Indian and Alaska Native	8,013	0.6%
Asian	14,643	1.1%
Native Hawaiian and Other Pacific Islander	211	0.0%
Some other race	3,151	0.2%
Two or more races	27,126	2.0%

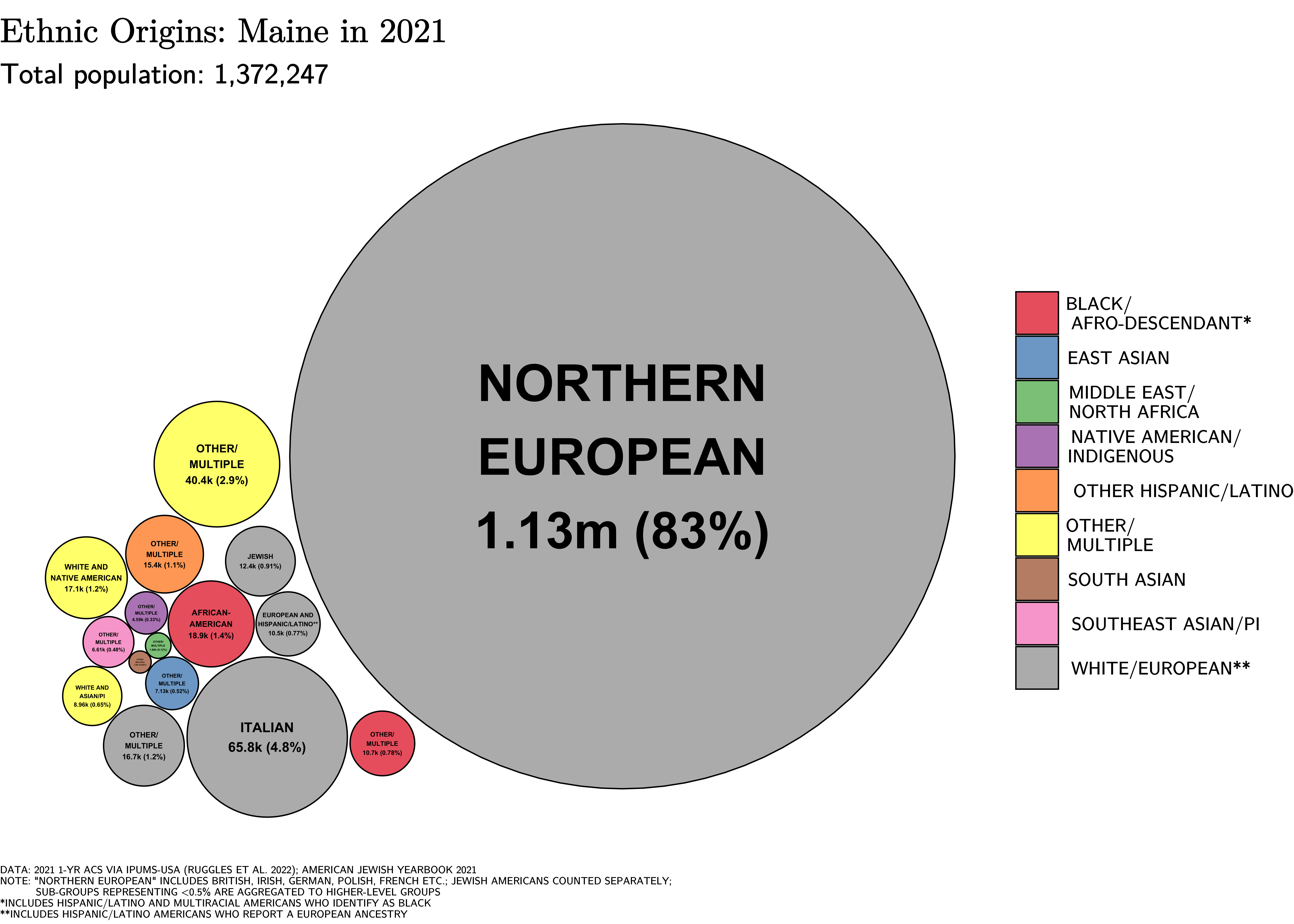
Ethnic origins in Maine

According to the 2016 American Community Survey, 1.5% of Maine's population were of Hispanic or Latino origin (of any race): Mexican (0.4%), Puerto Rican (0.4%), Cuban (0.1%), and other Hispanic or Latino origin (0.6%). The six largest ancestry groups were: English (20.7%), Irish (17.3%), French (15.7%), German (8.1%), American (7.8%) and French Canadian (7.7%).

Maine – Racial and ethnic composition Note: the US Census treats Hispanic/Latino as an ethnic category. This table excludes Latinos from the racial categories and assigns them to a separate category. Hispanics/Latinos may be of any race.
Race / Ethnicity (NH = Non-Hispanic)	Pop 2000	Pop 2010	Pop 2020	% 2000	% 2010	% 2020
White alone (NH)	1,230,297	1,254,297	1,228,264	96.50%	94.42%	90.16%
Black or African American alone (NH)	6,440	15,154	25,115	0.51%	1.14%	1.84%
Native American or Alaska Native alone (NH)	6,911	8,210	7,293	0.54%	0.62%	0.54%
Asian alone (NH)	9,014	13,442	16,668	0.71%	1.01%	1.22%
Pacific Islander alone (NH)	334	313	407	0.03%	0.02%	0.03%
Other race alone (NH)	836	1,014	4,430	0.07%	0.08%	0.33%
Mixed race or Multiracial (NH)	11,731	18,996	53,573	0.92%	1.43%	3.93%
Hispanic or Latino (any race)	9,360	16,935	26,609	0.73%	1.27%	1.95%
Total	1,274,923	1,328,361	1,362,359	100.00%	100.00%	100.00%

People citing that they are American are of overwhelmingly English descent, but have ancestry that has been in the region for so long (often since the 17th century) that they choose to identify simply as Americans.

Maine has the highest percentage of French Americans of any state. Most of them are of Canadian origin, but in some cases have been living there since prior to the American Revolutionary War. There are particularly high concentrations in the northern part of Maine in Aroostook County, which is part of a cultural region known as Acadia that goes over the border into New Brunswick. Along with the Acadian population in the north, many French-Canadians came from Quebec as immigrants between 1840 and 1930.

The upper Saint John River valley area was once part of the so-called Republic of Madawaska, before the frontier was decided in the Webster-Ashburton Treaty of 1842. Over a quarter of the population of Lewiston, Waterville, and Biddeford are Franco-American. Most of the residents of the Mid Coast and Down East sections are chiefly of British heritage. Smaller numbers of various other groups, including Irish, Italian, Swedish and Polish, have settled throughout the state since the late 19th and early 20th century immigration waves.

In the 2020 Census, 25,752 Maine residents were identified as African American (of the total 1,362,359). . African Americans in the five counties of Cumberland (12,120), Androscoggin (6,531), York (2,098), Penobscot (1,507), and Kennebec (919) make up more than 89% of all African Americans in the state.

Today there are four federally recognized tribes in Maine, including the Mi'kmaq Nation. In 2020, 7,885 identified as being Native American alone, and 25,617 did in combination with one or more other races.

==== Birth data ====
Note: Births in table do not sum to 100% because Hispanics are counted both by their ethnicity and by their race.

Live births by single race/ethnicity of mother
Race	2014	2015	2016	2017	2018	2019	2020	2021	2022	2023	2024
> White	11,654 (91.8%)	11,563 (91.7%)	11,484 (90.4%)	10,958 (89.1%)	11,022 (89.5%)	10,401 (88.3%)	10,231 (88.7%)	10,619 (88.4%)	10,640 (88.0%)	10,015 (86.1%)	9,669 (83.4%)
Black	450 (3.5%)	473 (3.7%)	411 (3.2%)	545 (4.4%)	546 (4.4%)	541 (4.6%)	514 (4.5%)	551 (4.6%)	679 (5.6%)	790 (6.8%)	799 (6.9%)
Asian	248 (1.9%)	186 (1.5%)	192 (1.5%)	219 (1.8%)	202 (1.6%)	217 (1.8%)	195 (1.7%)	197 (1.6%)	163 (1.3%)	199 (1.7%)	192 (1.7%)
American Indian	158 (1.2%)	143 (1.1%)	97 (0.7%)	88 (0.7%)	99 (0.8%)	96 (0.8%)	85 (0.7%)	71 (0.6%)	76 (0.7%)	70 (0.6%)	72 (0.6%)
Hispanic (of any race)	200 (1.6%)	251 (2.0%)	238 (1.9%)	229 (1.9%)	224 (1.8%)	257 (2.2%)	258 (2.2%)	305 (2.5%)	338 (2.8%)	334 (2.9%)	355 (3.1%)
Total	12,698 (100%)	12,607 (100%)	12,705 (100%)	12,298 (100%)	12,311 (100%)	11,779 (100%)	11,539 (100%)	12,006 (100%)	12,093 (100%)	11,627 (100%)	11,601 (100%)

- Since 2016, data for births of White Hispanic origin are not collected, but included in one Hispanic group; persons of Hispanic origin may be of any race.

In 2018, the top countries of origin for Maine's immigrants were Canada, the Philippines, Germany, India and Korea.

=== Language ===
Maine does not have an official language, but the most widely spoken language in the state is English. The 2010 census reported 92.91% of Maine residents aged five and older spoke only English at home. French-speakers are the state's chief linguistic minority; census figures show that Maine has the highest percentage of people speaking French at home of any state: 3.93% of Maine households are French-speaking, compared with 3.45% (including Cajun and Creole) in Louisiana, which is the second highest state. Spanish is the third-most-common language in Maine, after English and French.

=== Religion ===
Religious self-identification, per Public Religion Research Institute's 2022 American Values Survey
1. Protestantism (41.0%)
2. Catholicism (21.0%)
3. Unitarian/Universalist (1.00%)
4. Unaffiliated (30.0%)
5. Judaism (5.00%)
6. New Age (1.00%)
7. Other (1.00%)

According to the Pew Research Center in 2014, the religious affiliations of Maine were: Protestant 37% (in particular: Evangelical Protestant 14%, Mainline Protestant 21%, Historical Black Protestant 2%), Atheism or Agnosticism 6%, Nothing in Particular 26%, Roman Catholic Church 21%, other Christians 5%, non-Christian religions including Hinduism, Islam, Buddhism and Baháʼí 7%, and Pagans and Unitarians 5%.

In 2014, the Roman Catholic Church was the largest religious denomination and the Baptists (7% Evangelical and 5% Mainline) were the state's largest Protestant denomination, followed by the Methodists (6%) and the Congregationalists (5%). The atheists and the agnostics are only 6% of the state, but 26% of Mainers said that they "Believe in God but they are Unaffiliated." Eighty-one percent of Mainers believed in God, while 3% did not know and 16% did not believe in God. Thirty-four percent of Mainers thought that religion was "very important" and 29% said that it was "important", while 21% said that religion was not important.

According to a survey through the Public Religion Research Institute in 2020, approximately 62% of the population were Christian; the religiously unaffiliated slightly increased to 33% from the separate 2014 study by the Pew Research Center. In a 2022 study by the Public Religion Research Institute, 63% of the population were Christian, and 30% were religiously unaffiliated. Among the non-Christian population in 2022, 1% were Unitarian Universalist, 5% Jewish, and 1% New Ager.

According to the Association of Religion Data Archives in 2020, with Christianity as the dominant faith, the largest denominations by number of adherents were Catholicism (219,233 members), non-denominational Protestantism (45,364), and United Methodists (19,686). According to the same study, there were an estimated 16,894 Muslims in the state.

== Economy ==
Total employment (May 2024):

- 674,900

Total employer establishments (2021):

- 42,519

In 2025, Maine's total gross state product was $102.8 billion and the state's per capita personal income was $71,662. Its median gross income was $69,543. As of May 2025, Maine's unemployment rate is 3.4%. As of January 2025, Maine's minimum wage is $14.65. In 2025, small businesses made up 99.2% of Maine's businesses, and employed 54.5% of the state's workforce.

Maine's industrial outputs consist chiefly of paper, lumber and wood products, electronic equipment, leather products, food products, textiles, and bio-technology. Naval shipbuilding and construction remain key as well, with Bath Iron Works in Bath and Portsmouth Naval Shipyard in Kittery.

Brunswick Landing, formerly Naval Air Station Brunswick, is also in Maine. Formerly a large support base for the U.S. Navy, the BRAC campaign initiated the Naval Air Station's closing, despite a government-funded effort to upgrade its facilities. The former base has since been changed into a civilian business park, as well as a new satellite campus for Southern Maine Community College.

Historically, Maine ports played a key role in national transportation. Beginning around 1880, Portland's rail link and ice-free port made it Canada's principal winter port, until the aggressive development of Halifax, Nova Scotia in the mid-20th century. In 2013, 12,039,600 short tons passed into and out of Portland by sea, which places it 45th of U.S. water ports. Portland International Jetport has been expanded, providing the state with increased air traffic from carriers such as JetBlue and Southwest Airlines.

Maine has very few large companies that maintain headquarters in the state, and that number has fallen due to consolidations and mergers, particularly in the pulp and paper industry. Some of the larger companies that do maintain headquarters in Maine include Covetrus in Portland; Fairchild Semiconductor in South Portland; IDEXX Laboratories in Westbrook; Hannaford Bros. Co. in Scarborough; L.L.Bean in Freeport; and Puritan Medical Products in Guilford. Western Maine aquifers and springs are a source of bottled water for companies like Poland Spring.

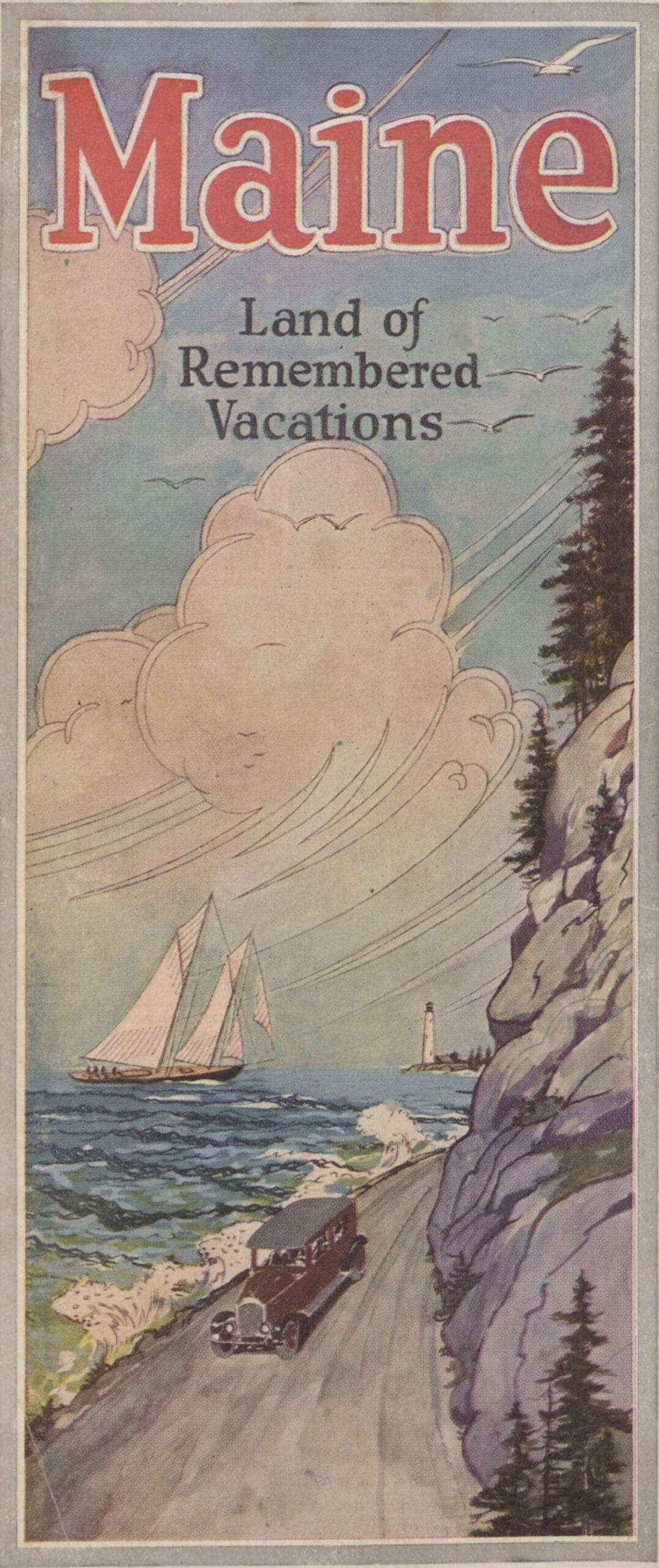
1928 ad promoting vacations in Maine

=== Tourism ===
Tourism and outdoor recreation play a major and increasingly important role in Maine's economy. In 2023, 15,267,000 visitors spent more than $9 billion in Maine. In 2024, Maine's outdoor recreation industry generated $3.9 billion and employed more than 32,000 people. An estimated 14% of the housing stock in Maine is used as vacation homes. In the late 19th century, artist colonies developed in Ogunquit and on Monhegan. Acadia National Park became part of the national park system in 1929. The park is one of the most popular national parks in the United States. It attracts more than 4 million visitors each year. In 2024, visitors spent $475 million in the Bar Harbor area where the park is located. The flagship L.L. Bean store in Freeport attracts more than 3 million visitors each year.

Most visitors arrive in the spring, summer, and fall, and southern Maine's coastal beaches, including those in Old Orchard Beach, Kittery, York, Wells, and Kennebunk, are top destinations. In 2023, Maine's beaches attracted almost 4 million visitors who spent $2.5 billion. Visitors also visit interior Maine which has 6,000 lakes and ponds and many beaches, youth summer camps, lakeside homes, cottages, and lake-related businesses. In 2024, a study determined that Maine's lakes and ponds have an estimated total net value of $14.2 billion per year.

Visitors also visit Maine in the winter. Between December 2024 and April 2025, more than 3 million out-of-state visitors came to Maine. Many arrive for the Thanksgiving and Christmas holidays, visiting towns including Ogunquit, which hosts a Christmas by the Sea festival, Kennebunkport, which hosts Christmas Prelude, Camden, which hosts a Christmas by the Sea festival, and Portland, where the Portland Symphony Orchestra hosts the annual Magic of Christmas concert series and the Maine Narrow Gauge Railroad runs The Polar Express Christmas train. At least eight Hallmark Christmas movies have been set in Maine. Visitors also arrive to experience Maine's winter outdoor recreation, including Nordic and alpine skiing. During the 2022–2023 winter season, 1,372,128 out-of-state skiers visited Maine ski resorts, including Sugarloaf, Sunday River, Saddleback, Big Moose Mountain, Black Mountain of Maine, Mount Abram, and Pleasant Mountain.

Summer visitors and tourism began before the Civil War. After the Civil War, the number of visitors increased significantly. This was when a growing urban middle class wanted to leave cities in the summer to seek Maine's coast, lakes, woods, and mountains. Maine's fresh air, pure water, and local food were additional attractions.

Many notable persons have drawn attention to Maine's natural attractions. In 1846, Henry David Thoreau came to Maine to climb Katahdin and came back two more times to explore other trails and waterways. His book The Maine Woods was published in 1864 recounting his journeys in Maine. In 1849, Elizabeth Oakes Smith climbed Katahdin and wrote about her experience. As early as 1878, Theodore Roosevelt visited Maine. Roosevelt explored what is now designated the Katahdin Woods and Waters National Monument with legendary Maine guide William Wingate Sewall and stayed at the William Sewall House. American businessman William Henry Vanderbilt first vacationed with his family in Bar Harbor in the early 1880s. In 1910, businessman John D. Rockefeller Jr. purchased a summer home in Seal Harbor and later spent $3.5 million developing the Carriage Roads of what is now Acadia National Park. In 1997, TV personality and businesswomen Martha Stewart purchased Skylands in Seal Harbor, featuring the estate regularly in national media outlets. The state is a popular destination for hiking, snowmobiling, skiing, boating, camping, fishing, and hunting, among other activities.

=== Agriculture ===
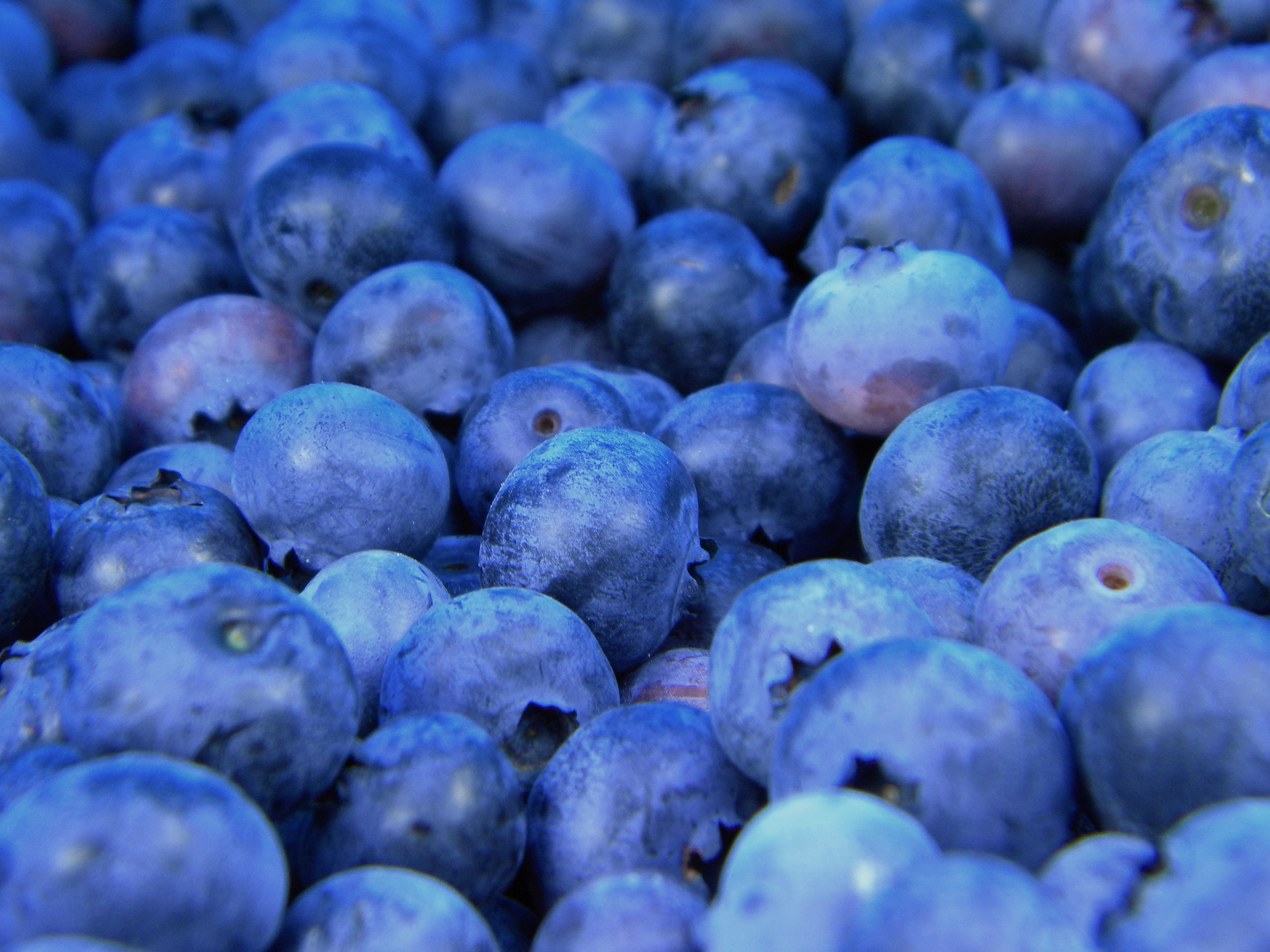
Wild low-bush blueberries are only produced commercially in Maine.

Agriculture plays a significant role in Maine's economy. In 2020, Maine's 7,600 farms produced $2.1 billion in direct sales. Maine is home to the Maine Organic Farmers and Gardeners Association and had 535 certified organic farms in 2019 that generated $60 million in direct sales.

Vegetable farming was the most valuable farming sector in Maine with $231,900,000 in sales in 2020. In 2020 dairy farming had $154,500,000 in direct sales, greenhouse and nursery production had $72,300,000 in direct sales, and fruit farming had $63,900,000 in direct sales. Maine's grain industry is undergoing a revival. In 2020, Maine farms had $26,300,000 in direct sales of grains and oilseeds, and the processing of grains and oilseeds generated an additional $89,800,000 in direct sales. Maine is a significant U.S.-producer of maple syrup, generating $56 million in 2025. Maine has approximately 500 licensed maple syrup producers who produced 549,000 gallons of maple syrup from almost 1.8 million taps in 2025.

Maine's agricultural outputs include mixed vegetables, potatoes, wild blueberries, apples, grains, maple syrup, maple sugar, poultry, eggs, dairy products, and seaweed. Aroostook County is known for its potato crops. Potatoes make the state $166,672,000 a year. Maine is the top U.S. producer of low-bush blueberries. Preliminary data from the USDA for 2012 also indicate Maine was the largest blueberry producer of the major blueberry producing states, with a total production of 91,100,000 lbs. This data includes both low (wild) and high-bush (cultivated) blueberries. In 2017, the production of Maine's seaweed industry was estimated at $20 million per year. In 2022, Maine seaweed farmers harvested over 1 million pounds of seaweed, which was predicted to rise to 4.1 million pounds by 2025. Sixty percent of American seaweed comes from Maine.

=== Commercial fishing ===
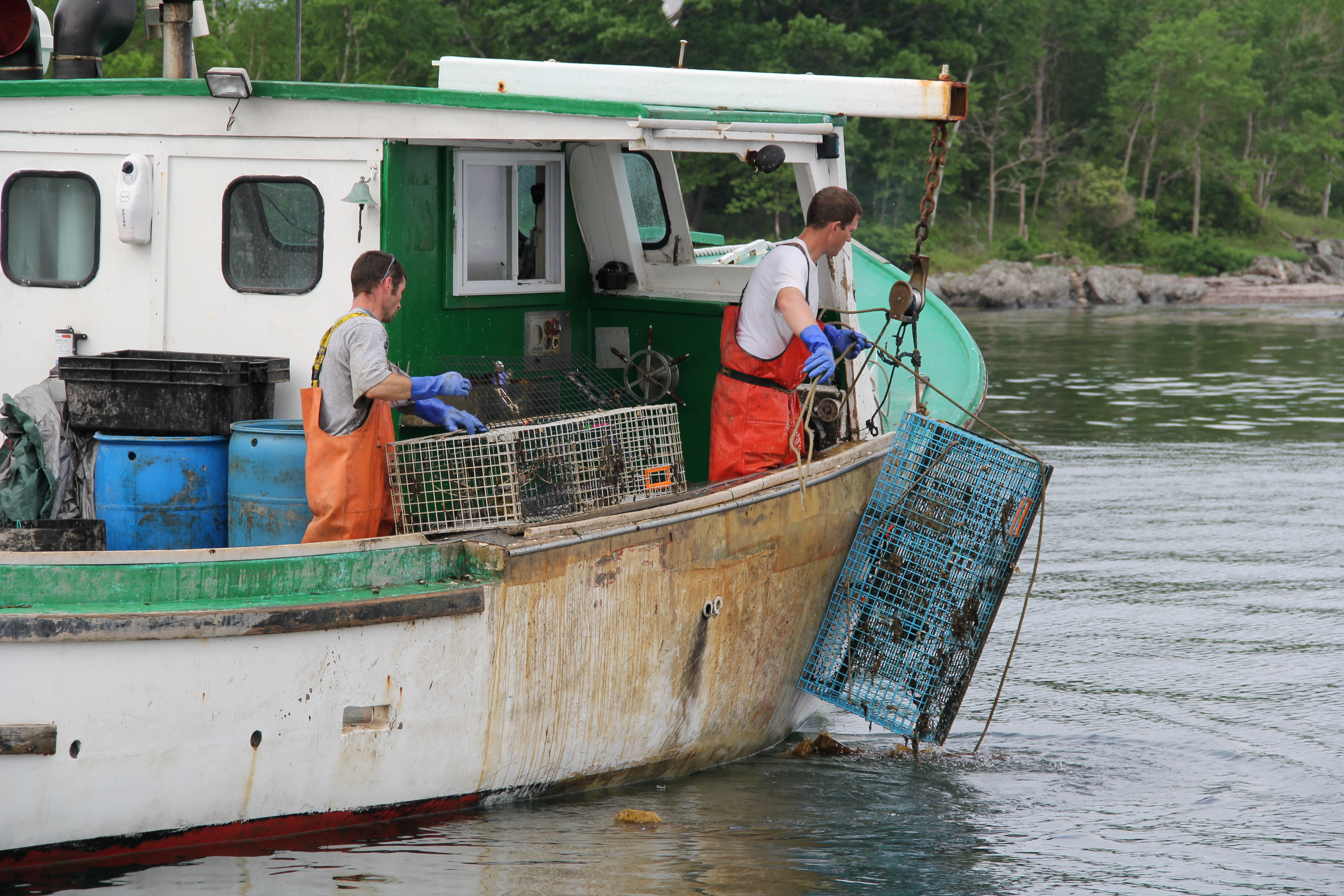
Lobstering in Portland

Commercial fishing, once a mainstay of the state's economy, maintains a presence, particularly lobstering and groundfishing. In 2025, Maine's commercial harvesters earned $619 million. While lobster is the main seafood focus for Maine, the harvest of oysters are on the rise. In 2015, 14% of the Northeast's total oyster supply came from Maine. The shrimp industry of Maine is on a government-mandated hold. With an ever-decreasing Northern shrimp population, Maine fishermen are no longer allowed to catch and sell shrimp. The hold began in 2014, but a pilot program allowing limited shrimp fishing began in 2025.

=== Christmas tree farms ===
Since the early 20th century, Maine has been among the top producers of Christmas trees and Christmas wreaths annually. Its 370 Christmas tree farms produce roughly 100,000 trees each year. The Christmas tree industry in Maine generates an estimated $19 million in direct economic impact annually and supports 800 jobs. On average, it takes Maine farmers seven to eight years to grow a Christmas tree to a sellable size. Many of Maine's Christmas tree farms are small, family-run operations that offer choose-your-own trees or sell trees at roadside stands. Ninety percent of Christmas trees grown in Maine are balsam firs, the only fir tree native to Maine. As early as 1860, Maine Christmas tree farmers Thomas W. Jackson Jr. and his son Herbert A. Jackson of Portland were selling Christmas trees in New York City. The trees ranged in height from four feet to 25 feet tall.

=== Shipbuilding ===
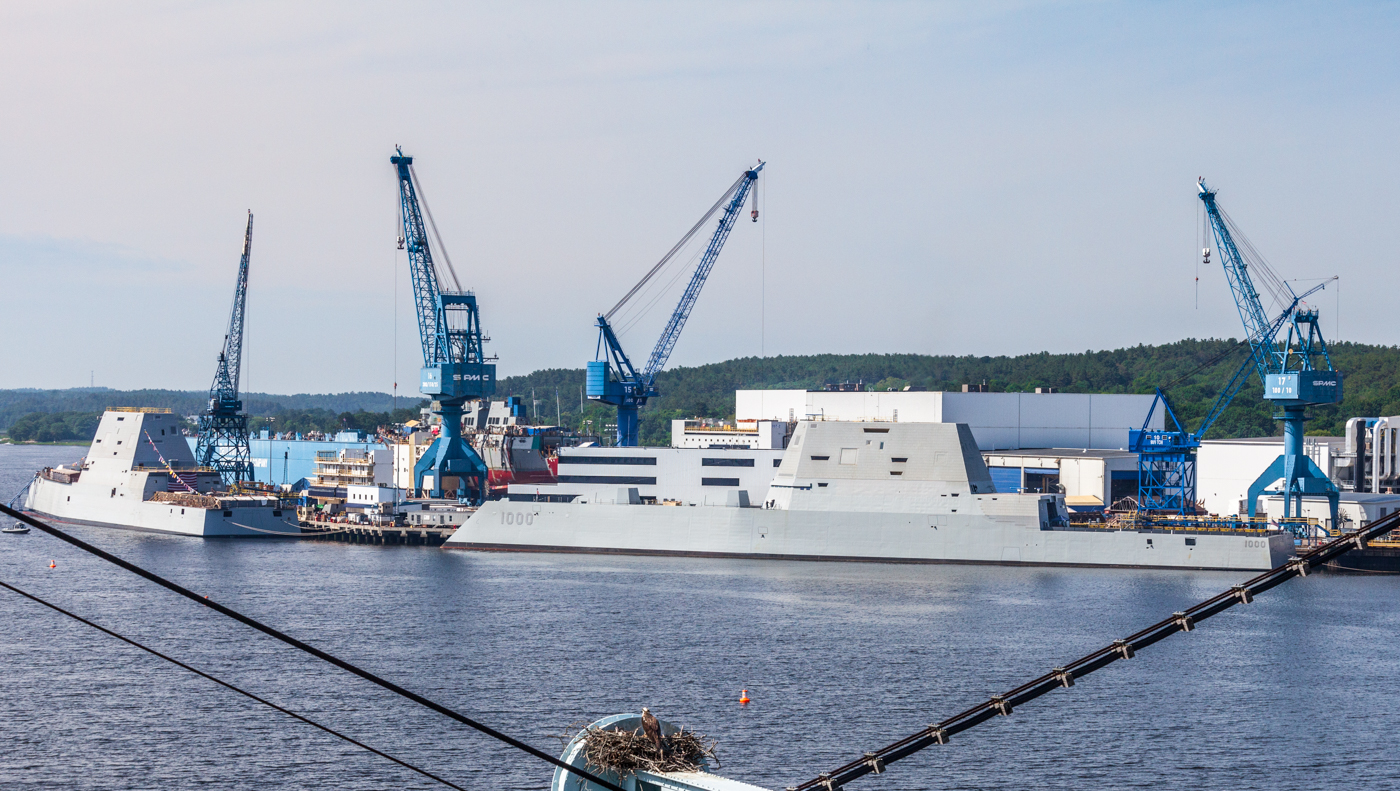
Bath Iron Works naval shipbuilding

Maine has a long-standing tradition of being home to many shipbuilding companies, such as Bath Iron Works and the Portsmouth Naval Shipyard. In the 18th and 19th centuries, Maine was home to many shipyards that produced wooden sailing ships. The main function of these ships was to transport either cargos or passengers overseas. One of these yards was located in Pennellville Historic District in what is now Brunswick, Maine. This yard, owned by the Pennell family, was typical of the many family-owned shipbuilding companies of the time period. Other such examples of shipbuilding families were the Skolfields and the Morses. During the 18th and 19th centuries, wooden shipbuilding of this sort made up a sizable portion of the economy.

=== Creative economy & the arts ===
Maine has developed a burgeoning creative economy, most notably centered in the Greater Portland vicinity. In 2022, Portland's nonprofit arts and culture industry generated $86 million in economic activity, according to a survey by Americans for the Arts. The foundation of Maine's creative economy is its long tradition of fine arts. It also includes craftsmen, historic sites, museums, and cultural attractions.

=== Taxation ===
Maine has an income tax structure containing two brackets, 6.5 and 7.95 percent of personal income. Before July 2013, Maine had four brackets: 2, 4.5, 7, and 8.5 percent. Maine's general sales tax rate is 5.5 percent. The state also levies charges of nine percent on lodging and prepared food and ten percent on short-term auto rentals. Commercial sellers of blueberries, a Maine staple, must keep records of their transactions and pay the state 1.5 cents per pound ($1.50 per 100 pounds) of the fruit sold each season. All real and tangible personal property located in the state of Maine is taxable unless specifically exempted by statute. The administration of property taxes is handled by the local assessor in incorporated cities and towns, while property taxes in the unorganized territories are handled by the State Tax Assessor.

== Transportation ==
=== Airports ===
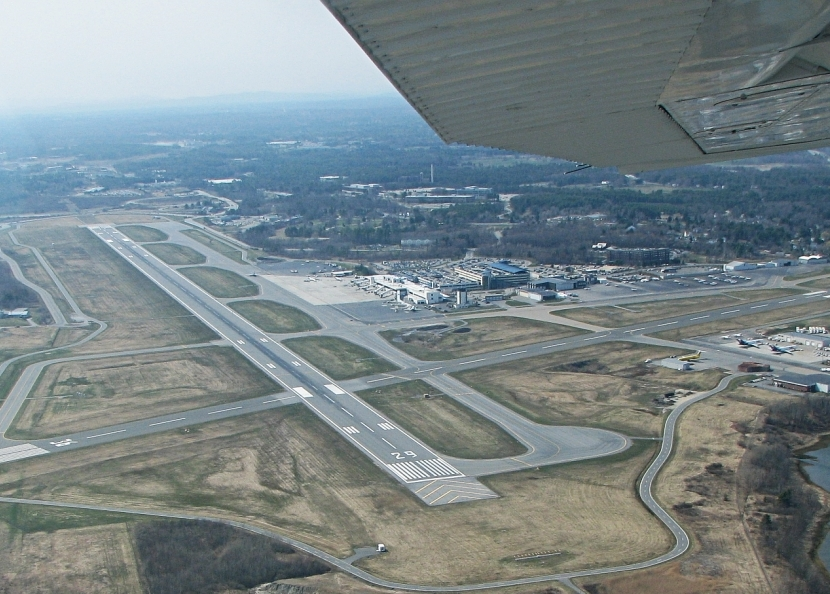
Portland International Jetport

Maine receives passenger jet service at its two largest airports, the Portland International Jetport in Portland, and the Bangor International Airport in Bangor. Both are served daily by many major airlines to destinations such as New York, Atlanta, and Orlando. Essential Air Service also subsidizes service to a number of smaller airports in Maine, bringing small turboprop aircraft to regional airports such as the Augusta State Airport, Hancock County-Bar Harbor Airport, Knox County Regional Airport, and the Presque Isle International Airport. These airports are served by regional providers such as Cape Air with Cessna 402s, and CommutAir with Embraer ERJ-145 aircraft.

Many smaller airports are scattered throughout Maine, serving only general aviation traffic. The Eastport Municipal Airport, for example, is a city-owned public-use airport with 1,200 general aviation aircraft operations each year from single-engine and ultralight aircraft.

=== Highways ===
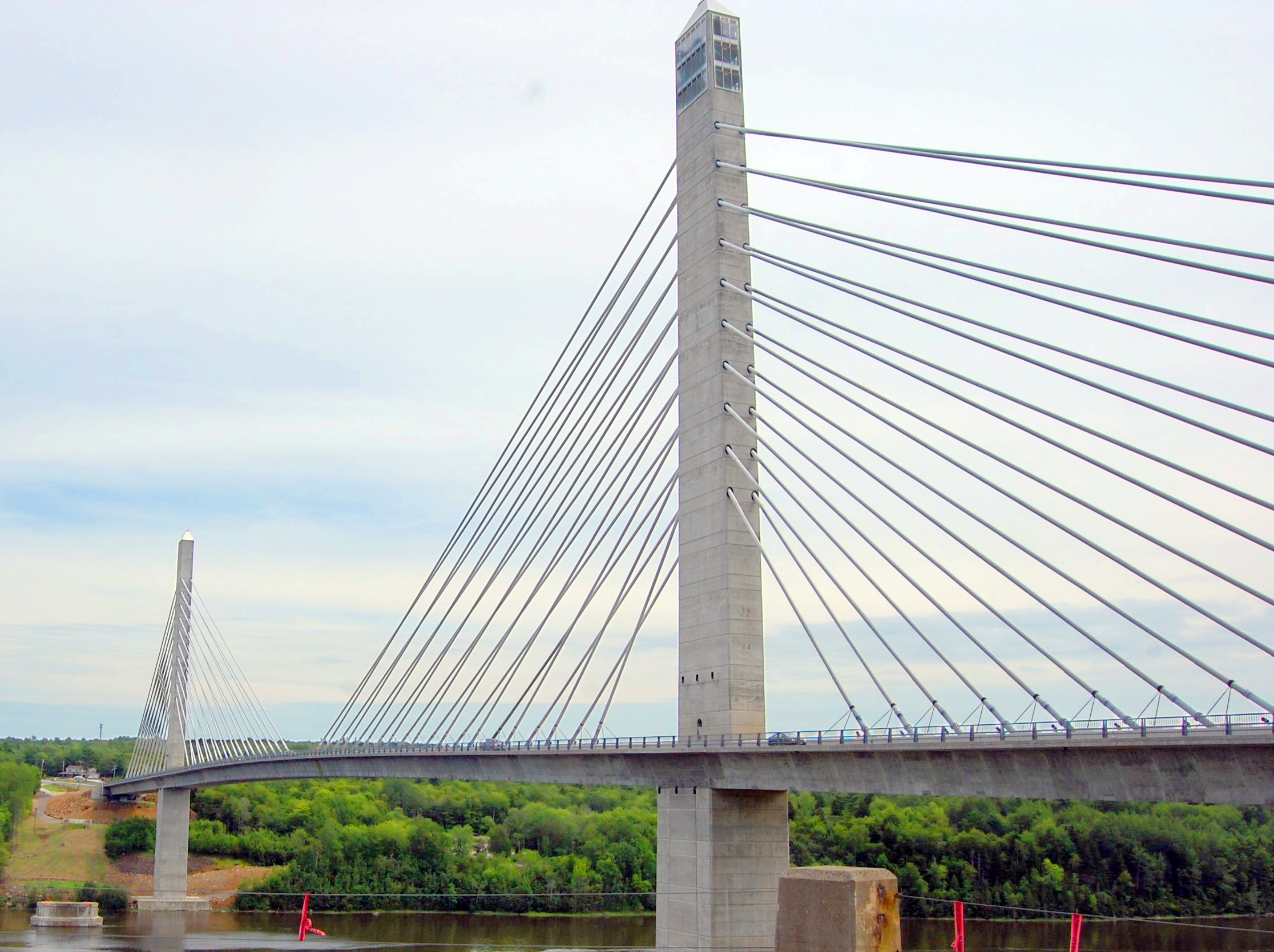
The Penobscot Narrows Bridge, carrying U.S. Route 1 and Maine State Route 3 over the Penobscot River

Interstate 95 (I-95) travels through Maine, as well as its easterly branch I-295 and spurs I-195, I-395 and the unsigned I-495 (the Falmouth Spur). In addition, U.S. Route 1 (US 1) starts in Fort Kent and travels to Florida. The eastern terminus of the eastern section of US 2 starts in Houlton, near the New Brunswick, Canada border to Rouses Point, New York, at US 11. US 2A connects Old Town and Orono, primarily serving the University of Maine campus. US 201 and US 202 flow through the state. US 2, Maine State Route 6 (SR 6), and SR 9 are often used by truckers and other motorists of the Maritime Provinces en route to other destinations in the United States or as a short cut to Central Canada.

=== Rail ===
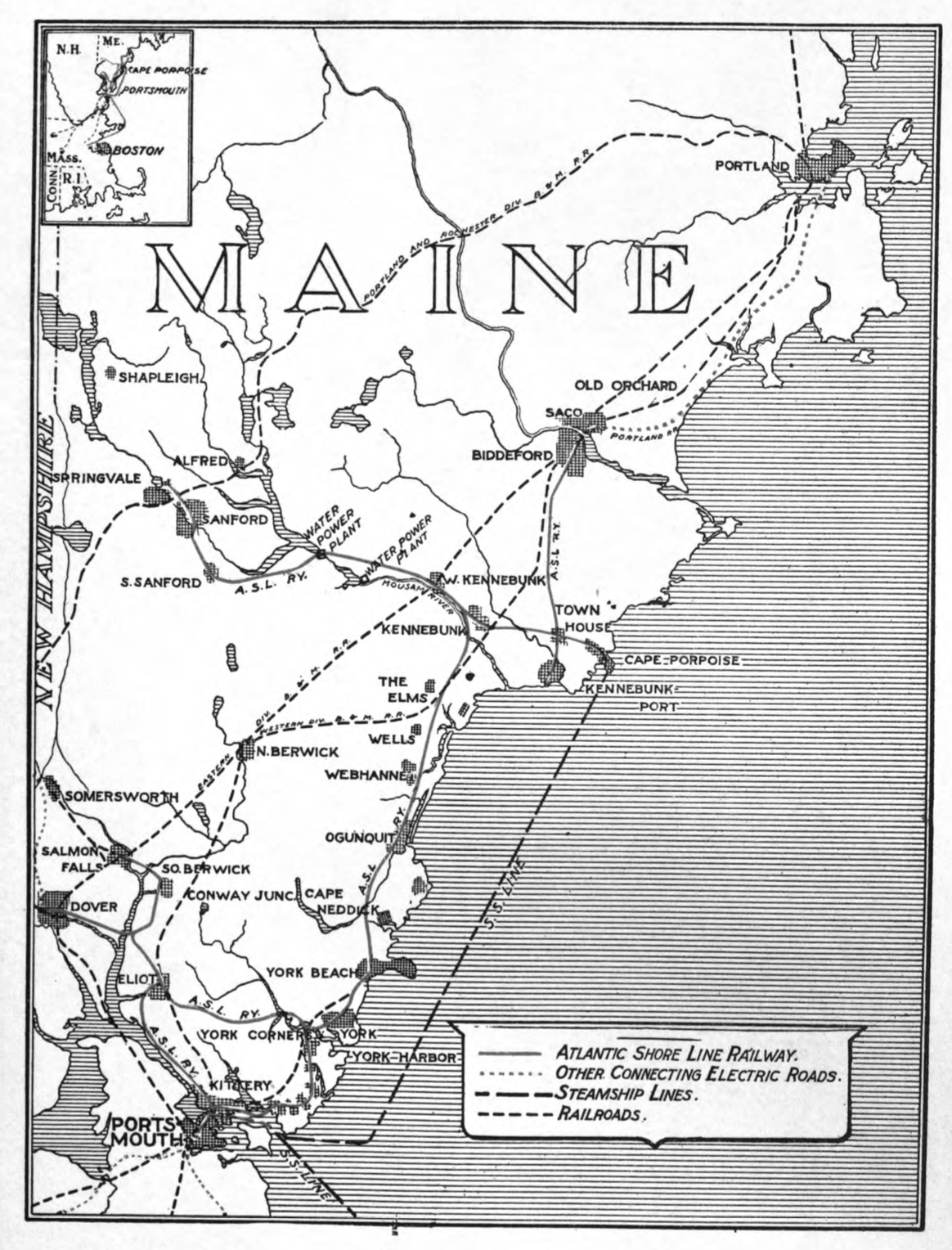
Map of Electric Railway Lines in Maine c 1907

==== Passenger ====
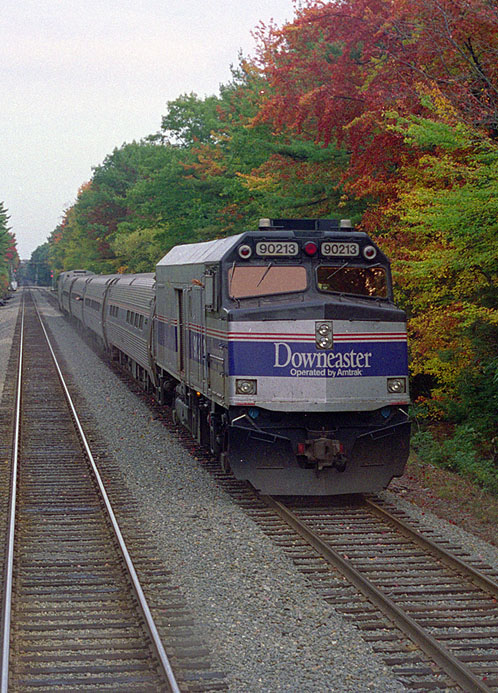
A southbound Downeaster passenger train at Ocean Park, Maine, as viewed from the cab of a northbound train

The Downeaster passenger train, operated by Amtrak, provides passenger service between Brunswick and Boston's North Station, with stops in Freeport, Portland, Old Orchard Beach, Saco, and Wells. The Downeaster makes five daily trips.

==== Freight ====
Freight service throughout the state is provided by a handful of carriers: CSX (which purchased Pan Am Railways, formerly known as Guilford Rail System) operates the former Boston and Maine and Maine Central railroads; additional service is provided by the St. Lawrence and Atlantic Railroad; Maine Eastern Railroad; Central Maine and Quebec Railway; and New Brunswick Southern Railway.

=== Shipping ===
==== Cargo ====
The International Marine Terminal in Portland provides shipping container transport. In 2021 an estimated 36,700 shipping containers moved through the terminal. In 2017, a total of 17,515 shipping containers were transported. The Icelandic shipping company Eimskip opened its United States headquarters in Portland in 2013. Its ships stop in Portland once a week in a route that includes Atlantic Canada and Iceland with connections to northern Europe and Asia. In 2015, the terminal moved 10,500 containers. The Maine Port Authority in 2016 began a $15.5 million expansion and improvement of the terminal. The Maine Port Authority leased the International Marine Terminal from the city of Portland in 2009.

== Law and government ==
The Maine Constitution structures Maine's state government, composed of three co-equal branches—the executive, legislative, and judicial branches. The state of Maine also has three Constitutional Officers (the Secretary of State, the State Treasurer, and the State Attorney General) and one Statutory Officer (the State Auditor).

The legislative branch is the Maine Legislature, a bicameral body composed of the Maine House of Representatives, with 151 members, and the Maine Senate, with 35 members. The Legislature is charged with introducing and passing laws.

The executive branch is headed by the Governor of Maine (currently Janet Mills). The Governor is elected every four years; no individual may serve more than two consecutive terms in this office. The current attorney general of Maine is Aaron Frey. As with other state legislatures, the Maine Legislature can by a two-thirds majority vote from both the House and Senate override a gubernatorial veto. Maine is one of seven states that do not have a lieutenant governor.

Maine.gov logo

The highest court in the state's judicial branch is the Maine Supreme Judicial Court. The lower courts are the District Court, Superior Court and Probate Court. All judges except for probate judges serve full-time, are nominated by the Governor, and confirmed by the Legislature for terms of seven years. Probate judges serve part-time and are elected by the voters of each county for four-year terms.

In a 2020 study, Maine was ranked as the 14th easiest state for citizens to vote in. In 2012, Maine became one of the first U.S. states to establish marriage rights for same-sex couples.

=== Politics ===
Maine politics are dynamic in nature, with parties loosely hung together, governors often winning by pluralities rather than majorities, and significant turnover both in members and parties in legislative districts. In his 2010 article "Maine's Paradoxical Politics", Kenneth Palmer suggests that "Maine's political leaders find themselves as centrists, primarily because they want to find practical solutions to difficult problems."

The results of the elections are often varied. Maine is currently considered to be moderately blue and a secondary battleground state, with unusually high support for independent candidates. The Republican Party has won Maine in 11 out of the past 20 presidential elections, and the governorship has been won by Democrats and independents three times each, and Republicans four times, since 1974.

Maine uses ranked-choice voting in primary elections for state and federal offices, as well as in general elections for federal offices. Ranked choice voting was adopted by voters in a 2016 referendum.

=== Counties ===
Maine is divided into political jurisdictions designated as counties. Since 1860 there have been 16 counties in the state, ranging in size from 370 to 6,829 square miles (958 to 17,700 km^{2}).

Maine counties
County name	County seat	Year founded	Population 2020 Census	Percent of total	Area (sq. mi.)	Percent of total
Androscoggin	Auburn	1854	111,139	8.16%	497	1.44%
Aroostook	Houlton	1839	67,105	4.93%	6,829	19.76%
Cumberland	Portland	1760	303,069	22.25%	1,217	3.52%
Franklin	Farmington	1838	29,456	2.16%	1,744	5.05%
Hancock	Ellsworth	1789	55,478	4.07%	1,522	4.40%
Kennebec	Augusta	1799	123,642	9.08%	951	2.75%
Knox	Rockland	1860	40,607	2.98%	1,142	3.30%
Lincoln	Wiscasset	1760	35,237	2.59%	700	2.03%
Oxford	Paris	1805	57,777	4.24%	2,175	6.29%
Penobscot	Bangor	1816	152,199	11.17%	3,556	10.29%
Piscataquis	Dover-Foxcroft	1838	16,800	1.23%	4,377	12.67%
Sagadahoc	Bath	1854	36,699	2.69%	370	1.07%
Somerset	Skowhegan	1809	50,477	3.71%	4,095	11.85%
Waldo	Belfast	1827	39,607	2.91%	853	2.47%
Washington	Machias	1790	31,095	2.28%	3,255	9.42%
York	Alfred	1636	211,972	15.56%	1,271	3.68%
Total counties: 16			Total 2020 population: 1,362,359		Total state area: 34,554 square miles (89,494 km^{2})	

=== Law enforcement ===
The Maine State Police (MSP) is the state police agency for Maine, which has jurisdiction across the state and was created in 1921.

== Municipalities ==
=== Organized municipalities ===
An organized municipality has a form of elected local government which administers and provides local services, keeps records, collects licensing fees, and can pass locally binding ordinances, among other responsibilities of self-government. The governmental format of most organized towns and plantations is the town meeting, while the format of most cities is the council-manager form. As of 2022 the organized municipalities of Maine consist of 23 cities, 430 towns, and 30 plantations. Collectively these 483 organized municipalities cover less than half of the state's territory. Maine also has three Reservations: Indian Island, Indian Township Reservation, and Pleasant Point Indian Reservation.

- The largest municipality in Maine, by population, is the city of Portland (pop. 68,408).
- The smallest city by population is Eastport (pop. 1,288).
- The largest town by population is Brunswick (pop. 21,756).
- The smallest town by population is Frye Island, a resort town which reported zero year-round population in the 2000 Census; one plantation, Glenwood Plantation, also reported a permanent population of zero.
- In the 2000 census, the smallest town aside from Frye Island was Centerville with a population of 26, but since that census, Centerville voted to disincorporate and therefore is no longer a town. The next smallest town with a population listed in that census is Beddington (pop. 60 at the 2020 census).
- The largest municipality by land area is the town of Allagash, at 128 square miles (332 km^{2}).
- The smallest municipality by land area is Monhegan Island, at 0.86 square miles (2.2 km^{2}). The smallest municipality by area that is not an island is Randolph, at 2.23 square miles (6 km^{2}).

=== Unorganized territory ===
Unorganized territory (UT) has no local government. Administration, services, licensing, and ordinances are handled by the state government as well as by respective county governments who have townships within each county's bounds. The unorganized territory of Maine consists of more than 400 townships (in Maine, towns are incorporated, townships are unincorporated), plus many coastal islands that do not lie within any municipal bounds. The UT land area is slightly over half the entire area of the State of Maine. Year-round residents in the UT number approximately 9,000 (about 1.3% of the state's total population), with many more people staying there only seasonally. Only four of Maine's sixteen counties (Androscoggin, Cumberland, Waldo and York) are entirely incorporated, although a few others are nearly so, and most of the unincorporated area is in the vast and sparsely populated Great North Woods of Maine.

=== Most populous cities and towns ===
Largest cities or towns in Maine 2020 U.S. Census populations
Rank	Name	County	Pop.
1	Portland	Cumberland	68,408
2	Lewiston	Androscoggin	37,121
3	Bangor	Penobscot	31,753
4	South Portland	Cumberland	26,498
5	Auburn	Androscoggin	24,061
6	Biddeford	York	22,552
7	Scarborough	Cumberland	22,135
8	Sanford	York	21,982
9	Brunswick	Cumberland	21,756
10	Westbrook	Cumberland	20,400

Throughout Maine, many municipalities, although each separate governmental entities, nevertheless form portions of a much larger population base. There are many such population clusters throughout Maine, but some examples from the municipalities appearing in the above listing are:

- Portland, South Portland, Cape Elizabeth, Westbrook, Scarborough, and Falmouth
- Lewiston and Auburn
- Bangor, Orono, Brewer, Old Town, and Hampden
- Biddeford, Saco and Old Orchard Beach
- Brunswick and Topsham
- Waterville, Winslow, Fairfield, and Oakland
- Presque Isle and Caribou

== Education ==
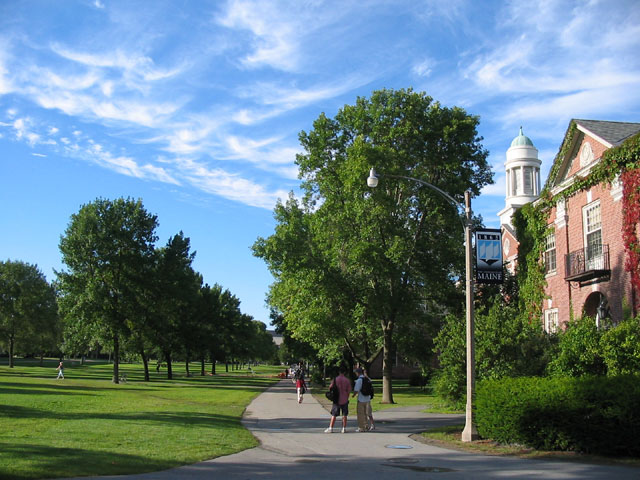
The University of Maine is the state's only research university.

There are thirty institutions of higher learning in Maine. These institutions include the University of Maine, which is the oldest, largest and only research university in the state. UMaine was founded in 1865 and is the state's only land grant and sea grant college. The University of Maine is located in the town of Orono and is the flagship of Maine. There are also branch campuses in Augusta, Farmington, Fort Kent, Machias, and Presque Isle.

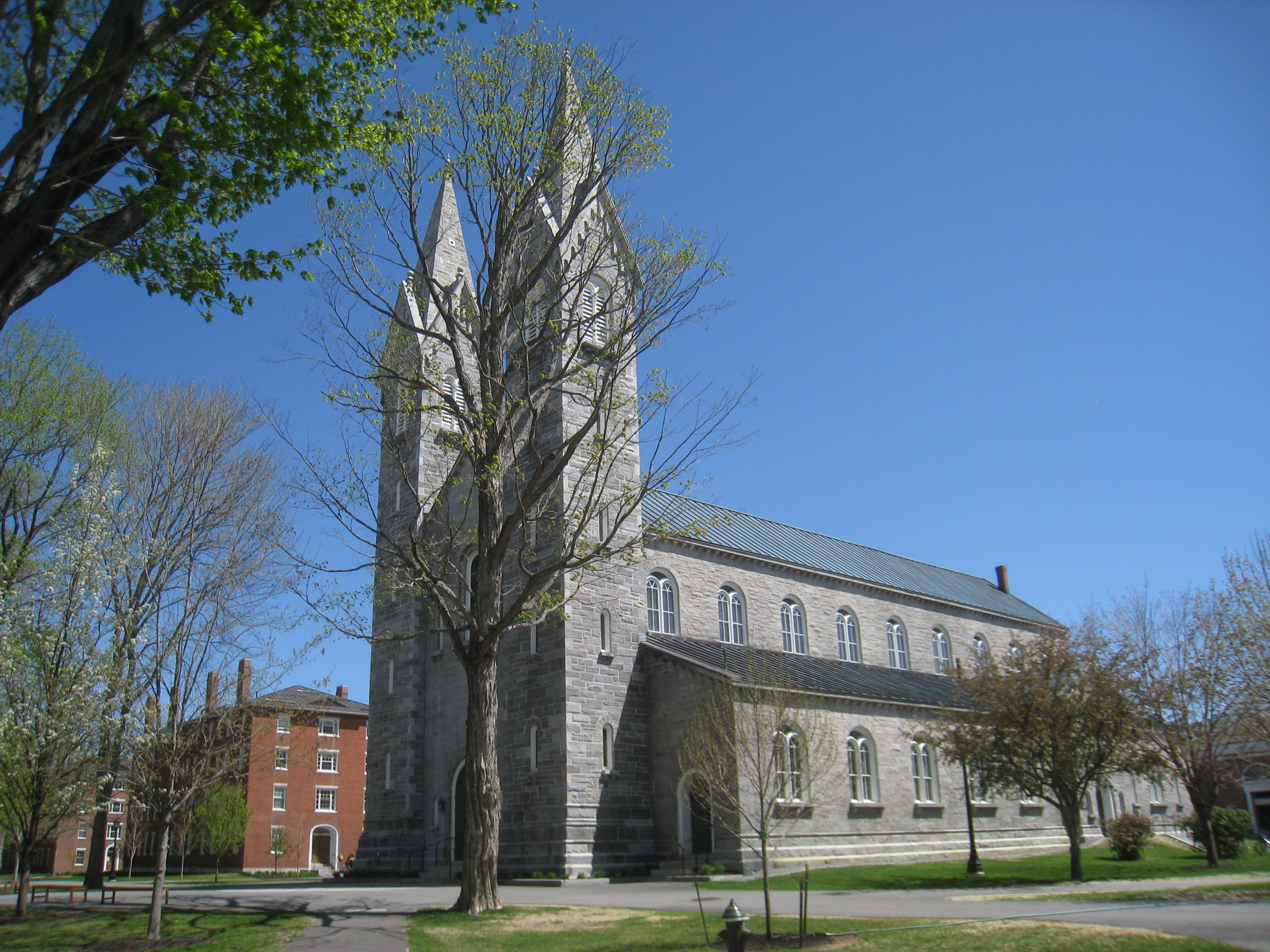
Colby, Bates, and Bowdoin (pictured) Colleges form the Colby-Bates-Bowdoin Consortium

Bowdoin College is a liberal arts college founded in 1794 in Brunswick, making it the oldest institution of higher learning in the state. Colby College in Waterville was founded in 1813 making it the second oldest college in Maine. Bates College in Lewiston was founded in 1855 making it the third oldest institution in the state and the oldest coeducational college in New England. The three colleges collectively form the Colby-Bates-Bowdoin Consortium and are ranked among the best colleges in the United States; often placing in the top 10% of all liberal arts colleges.

Maine's per-student public expenditure for elementary and secondary schools was 21st in the nation in 2012, at $12,344.

The collegiate system of Maine also includes numerous baccalaureate colleges such as: the Maine Maritime Academy (MMA), College of the Atlantic, Unity Environmental University, and Thomas College. There is only one medical school in the state, (University of New England's College of Osteopathic Medicine) and only one law school (The University of Maine School of Law). There is one art school in the state, Maine College of Art, along with a private graduate school, Institute for Doctoral Studies in the Visual Arts, which offers a Doctor of Philosophy to visual artists.

The Maine Community College System, founded in 1985 also serves "to provide associate degree, diploma and certificate programs directed at the educational, career and technical needs of the State's citizens and the workforce needs of the State's employers." This system includes Southern Maine Community College (SMCC), York County Community College (YCCC), Central Maine Community College (CMCC), Eastern Maine Community College (EMCC), Kennebec Valley Community College (KVCC), Northern Maine Community College (NMCC), and Washington County Community College (WCCC).

Private schools in Maine are funded independently of the state and its furthered domains. Private schools are less common than public schools. A large number of private elementary schools with under 20 students exist, but most private high schools in Maine can be described as "semi-private".

Maine also has Vocational Schools, such as the Biddeford Regional Center of Technology and Sanford Regional Technical Center that teach trades such as welding, construction and vehicle repair to students.

== Culture ==
=== Agriculture ===
Farms and farming constitute a large part of Maine's history, heritage, and culture. Family farms, homesteads, and backyard gardens are common features of the Maine landscape. Vegetable farming is the largest sector of Maine farming. As a result, Maine is known for its locally-grown food sold in markets and prepared at restaurants. Maine residents ranked number three, after Vermont and Oregon, for access to local food as measured by the high per capita ratio of farmers markets and consumer supported agriculture programs.

Historically, Maine was a center of agriculture before it achieved statehood. Prior to colonization, Wabanaki nations farmed large crops of corn and other produce in southern Maine. Maine was a center of grain production in the 1800s, until grain production moved westward. However, in the early 2000s the local food movement spurred renewed interested in locally grown grains. In 2007, the Kneading Conference was founded. In, 2012, the Skowhegan grist mill Maine Grains opened. The revival of grain farming and milling in Maine has led to the creation of other businesses, including bakeries and malthouses.

Maine has many vegetable farms and other small, diversified farms. In the 1960s and 1970s, the book "Living the Good Life" by Helen Nearing and Scott Nearing caused many young people to move to Maine and engage in small-scale farming and homesteading. These back-to-the-land migrants increased the population of some counties.

=== Newspapers ===
Maine's notable news outlets include the Portland Press Herald, the Lewiston Sun Journal, the Kennebec Journal, and the Bangor Daily News. The state's largest news organization is the Maine Trust for Local News, which owns the Press Herald (Maine's largest newspaper) and other publications.

Mainebiz is known for covering the state's business news and economic issues, in addition to publishing local commentary and rankings of notable individuals and businesses. It is owned by New England Business Media.

The Maine Press Association promotes journalists, newspapers, and media organizations in the state.

=== Festivals ===
Maine has multiple fairs and festivals that are held annually. These events include La Kermesse, a celebration of the state's French and French Canadian heritage, the Acadia Night Sky Festival, a festival of the starlit sky, the Great Falls Balloon Festival, a festival of hot air balloons, the Christmas Prelude festival in Kennebunkport, and a number of Portland Food Festivals. Maine is home to 25 agricultural fairs that include the Fryeburg Fair, the Cumberland Fair, the Union Fair, and the Common Ground Country Fair. There are a number of Old Home Days festivals, including the Yarmouth Clam Festival.

=== Food ===
Along with the growth of the local food movement over the last several decades, Maine has received national recognition for its food and restaurant scene. Portland was named Bon Appetit magazine's Restaurant City of the Year in 2018. In 2018, HealthIQ.com named Maine the 3rd most vegan-friendly state. Biddeford was selected by Food & Wine in 2022 as one of America's next great food cities.

Maine food shares many ingredients with Wabanaki cuisine, including corn, beans, squash, wild blueberries, maple syrup, fish, and seafood. By 1902, the Maine Italian sandwich had been invented in Portland. Sandwich shops across Maine serve the sandwiches. Baked beans are a common dish in Maine, served at community suppers where the beans are sometimes cooked underground in a bean hole. In New England, Maine baked beans are one of two well-known regional styles of baked beans, the other being Boston baked beans. Maine baked beans use thicker skinned, native bean varieties such like Marafax, soldier, and yellow-eye beans. From 1913 until 2021, baked beans were canned on the Portland waterfront at the B&M Baked Beans factory.

=== Sports teams ===
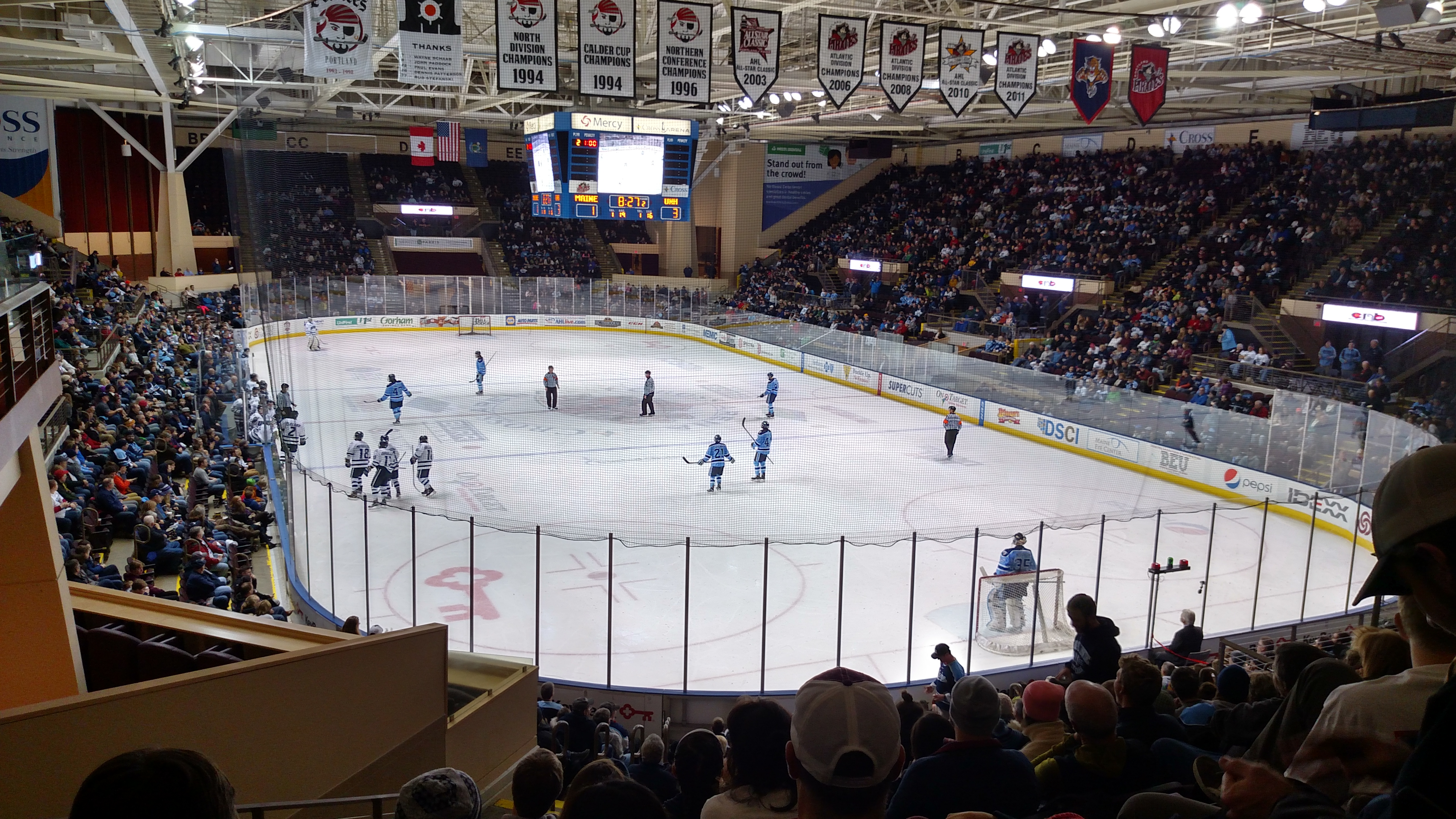
College hockey being played at the Cross Insurance Arena

==== Professional ====
- Maine Celtics, basketball, NBA G League
- Portland Sea Dogs, minor league baseball, Eastern League
- Maine Mariners, ice hockey, ECHL
- Portland Hearts of Pine, soccer, USL League One

==== Non-professional ====
- Portland Phoenix FC, soccer, Premier Developmental League
- Maine Roller Derby, roller derby, Women's Flat Track Derby Association

===== NCAA =====
- Maine Black Bears
- Husson Eagles
- Maine Maritime Mariners
- Bates Bobcats
- Colby Mules
- Bowdoin Polar Bears
- New England Nor'easters

===== USCAA =====
- York County Community College
- University of Maine at Augusta

=== Fashion ===
Maine people have a distinctive fashion that is closely associated with Bean boots, L.L. Bean clothing, flannel shirts, rugged pants, and outerwear. Maine fashion is casual and influenced by coastal living, outdoor recreation, and demanding outdoor occupations, such as logging and lobstering. In addition to Bean boots, other Maine fashion staples include Carhartt, muck boots, and long johns. Maine fashion is regarded as understated and associated with preppy clothing and nautical clothing. Other items associated with Maine fashion are tourmaline jewelry, Liberty Graphics T-shirts, and G.H. Bass Weejuns. Maine, particularly Portland, is home to a small number of fashion designers. The Maine College of Art & Design has a fashion and textile design program of study.

=== Accent and terminology ===
The traditional Maine accent is spoken in parts of Maine, especially along the "Down East" and "Midcoast" seaside regions. Maine maintains some vernacular and terminology that is unique in comparison to the rest of the country. Some of these include:

- "Ayuh" - An affirmative response, like "Yes".
- "Can't get there from here" - Place requires complicated instructions to reach.
- "Down cellah" - In the basement.
- "Downeast" - The coastline of Washington and Hancock counties, including Bar Harbor.
- "From away" - A non-native person of Maine.
- "Hard tellin' not knowin'" - Don't know.
- "Puckerbrush" - Dense vegetation likely to scratch your legs.
- "Upta camp" - Going to a more out-of-the-way, rustic place. Popularized by Bob Marley after his special of the same name.

== People from Maine ==
Citizens of Maine are often known as Mainers. The term Downeaster may be applied to residents of the northeast coast of the state. The term Mainiac is considered by some to be derogatory, but is embraced with pride by others, and is used for a variety of organizations and for events such as the YMCA Mainiac Sprint Triathlon & Duathlon.

== See also ==
- Index of Maine-related articles
- Outline of Maine

Preceded by Alabama	List of U.S. states by date of admission to the Union; Admitted on March 15, 1820 (23rd)	Succeeded by Missouri
