= Puritan Medical Products =

American manufacturer of medical diagnostic products

Puritan Medical Products is an American manufacturer of swab, diagnostic, and specimen collection products. Puritan is North America's largest manufacturer of COVID-19 testing swabs.

Based in Guilford, Maine, Puritan was a subsidiary of Hardwood Products Co., LP (its two subsidiaries being Hardwood Products Co., LLC and Puritan Medical Products Co., LLC), but has since split from Hardwood Products. Guilford has been described as America's "swab capital," with Puritan's manufacturing reportedly ushering in the "golden age of the swab."

Puritan operates three facilities in Maine (one in Guilford and two in Pittsfield), producing swabs and diagnostic testing supplies. In 2022, Puritan was named "Innovator of the Year" by the Maine International Trade Center.

As of 2025, Puritan has about 500 employees. It is a family-owned, “Maine-made” company. All of Puritan's production is done domestically using U.S.-sourced materials.

== History ==
Established in 1919, Puritan began as a producer of mint-flavored toothpicks in Saginaw, Michigan. The business moved to Maine in 1920, where white birch (needed for the toothpicks) was plentiful. Puritan eventually pivoted into the medical field with the introduction of tongue depressors and aseptic wood applicators, and in the mid-1970s began to focus specifically on medical and healthcare products.

== Leadership ==
Puritan is a family-owned business. The company is led by co-owner Timothy Templet, a third-generation family leader who serves as executive vice president of sales. Templet's grandfather, Lloyd Cartwright, founded Puritan in 1919 during the influenza pandemic. His daughter, Virginia Templet, serves as Puritan's marketing director.

A business advocate, Templet urges American workers to join small companies and other private-sector employers as a way of combating labor shortages. He also believes in proactively bracing for the next global health crisis, claiming the COVID-19 pandemic was a "wake-up call about stockpiles and being prepared." In June 2026, Templet published a Fortune op-ed column with Virginia for the U.S. Semiquincentennial, expressing optimism about domestic manufacturing as "the strongest backbone of America’s economy."

As of 2026, Puritan's CEO is Kerem Durdag. Derek McKenney serves as Puritan's vice president of manufacturing operations. In July 2026, Family Business magazine named McKenney to its "NextGens to Watch Class of 2026" for his leadership in contributing to the company's growth and transformation.

Puritan's fiduciary board of directors includes a mix of family and non-family members. Templet says the combination provides a “continuity of family perspective and the benefit of outside, independent expertise."

== COVID-19 pandemic ==
In April 2020, Puritan received over $75 million from the U.S. Department of Defense to produce more "flock tip testing swabs," which are preferred for COVID-19 testing. In June 2020, President Trump visited the company, highlighting its "noble tradition of American manufacturing excellence for more than 100 years." In July 2020, Puritan received another $51 million from the Defense Department to "expand industrial production capacity of flock tip testing swabs." To meet demand, the company partnered with Cianbro Corp. to open another swab production facility in Pittsfield, Maine. Granted federal funding to churn out 40 million swabs per month, the new Pittsfield facility is hiring and training hundreds of workers to produce up to 100 million swabs a month. In total, the federal government provided Puritan with more than $250 million in funding to accelerate COVID-19 testing swab production.

In November 2020, Puritan was awarded over $11 million to produce three million more testing swabs per month, with the money coming through the Paycheck Protection Program and Health Care Enhancement Act.

In December 2020, Inc. named Puritan the magazine's "Company of the Year," describing it as "the most important manufacturer in the world." Governor Janet Mills praised Puritan for "stepping up during tumultuous times to meet the needs of our state." According to Bloomberg, Puritan offers full benefits and pays fully trained employees $15 an hour, higher than the $12.15 hourly minimum wage in Maine.

In April 2021, Puritan announced plans to open a new manufacturing and distribution center in Orlinda, Tennessee, expanding the company's national presence. The Tennessee plant expected to create as many as 625 new jobs over the next five years. In addition to accessing a larger workforce than in Maine, Puritan chose the Tennessee location for "the location, logistics, and incentives offered by Tennessee state and county development officials." Puritan ceased operations at the plant in 2023, and sold the facility in 2025.

In November 2025, Puritan announced the release of PurSafe Plus for the collection, inactivation, and preservation of human upper respiratory specimens suspected of containing SARS-CoV-2.

== Other work ==
Puritan produces sterile and non-sterile swabs, made from flocked fiber, rayon, cotton, polyester, and foam. In addition to manufacturing COVID-19 testing swabs, Puritan is also active in the environmental, forensics, genetics, and microbiology media industries, among others. This includes the production of environmental surface sampling kits.

In 2023, Puritan partnered with GenoTyping Center of America, a Maine-based genetic testing company, to produce specialty swabs that collect DNA from rodents without the need to use a surgical procedure or harvest a fresh tissue sample from each rodent. Improving animal welfare, the new genotyping process is a DNA collection method that supports necessary biological research. Heather Johnson, commissioner of the state's Department of Economic and Community Development, says the partnership "illustrates the growth of Maine’s life sciences industry."

In 2024, Puritan announced a hiring spree, eyeing 50 employees to add to its roster of 450 workers. The company cited orders being up 45 percent from pre-pandemic levels, including demand for U.S.-made testing products for the flu, RSV, strep, and COVID.

The company's stated 2026 priority is an aggressive expansion of liquid media transport systems, in addition to the medical, industrial disposable, and antiseptic markets.
