= Index of Maine-related articles =

The location of the state of Maine in the United States of America

The following is an alphabetical list of articles related to the U.S. state of Maine.

== 0–9 ==
- .me.us – Internet second-level domain for the state of Maine
- 2020 Maine Question 1 ballot referendum
- 23rd state to join the United States of America
- The Original 1901 Maine Flag for the state of Maine

== A ==
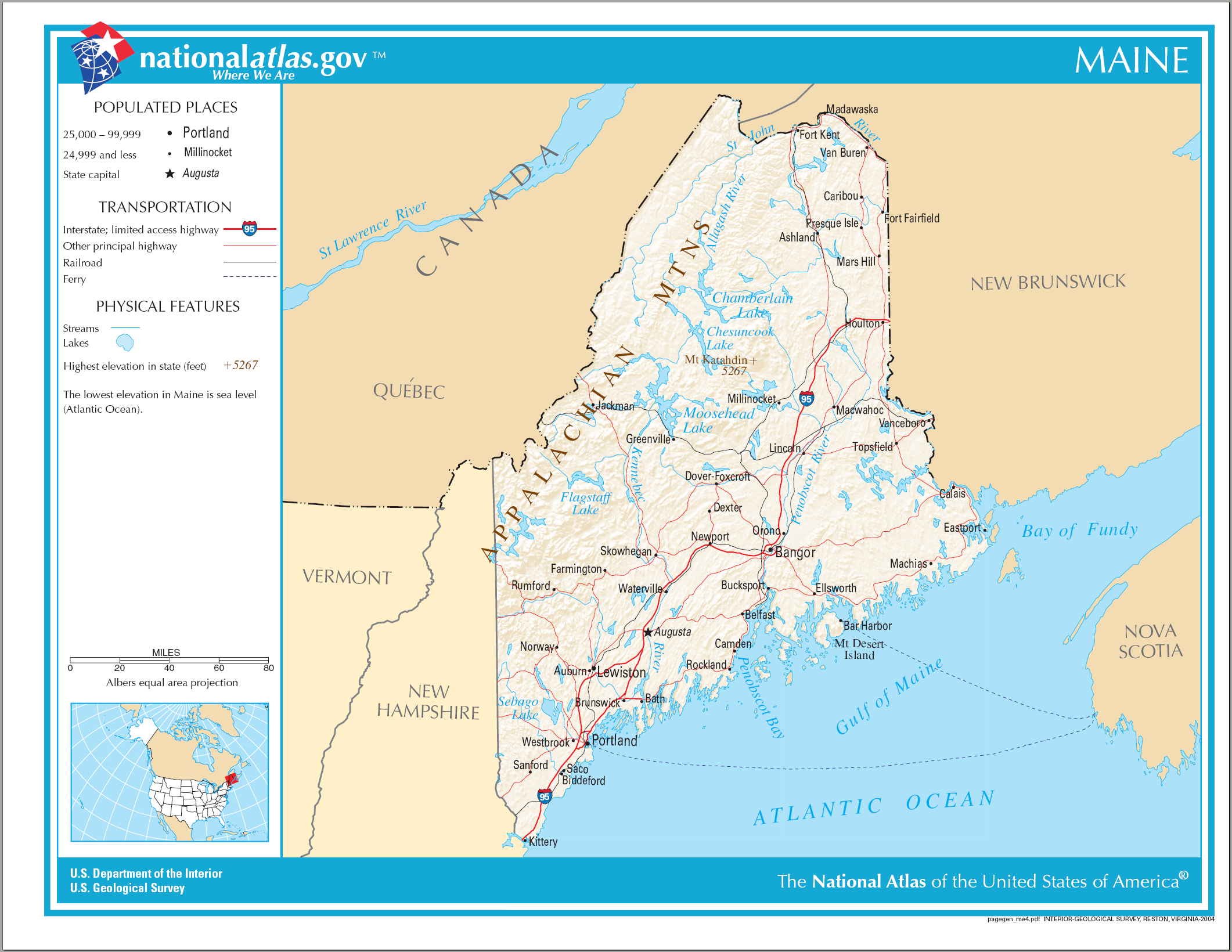
An enlargeable map of the state of Maine

- Abortion in Maine
- Adjacent state and provinces: (the only state with one neighboring state)
  - Province de Québec
  - Province of New Brunswick
  - State of New Hampshire
- Agriculture in Maine
- Airports in Maine
- Allen's Coffee Brandy, formerly the best-selling liquor in Maine.
- Amusement parks in Maine
- Arboreta in Maine
  - commons:Category:Arboreta in Maine
- Archaeology of Maine
  - Category:Archaeological sites in Maine
    - commons:Category:Archaeological sites in Maine
- Architecture of Maine
- Area codes in Maine
- Art museums and galleries in Maine
  - commons:Category:Art museums and galleries in Maine
- Astronomical observatories in Maine
  - commons:Category:Astronomical observatories in Maine
- Augusta, Maine, state capital since 1827

== B ==
- Bangor, Maine
- Botanical gardens in Maine
  - commons:Category:Botanical gardens in Maine
- Buildings and structures in Maine
  - commons:Category:Buildings and structures in Maine

== C ==
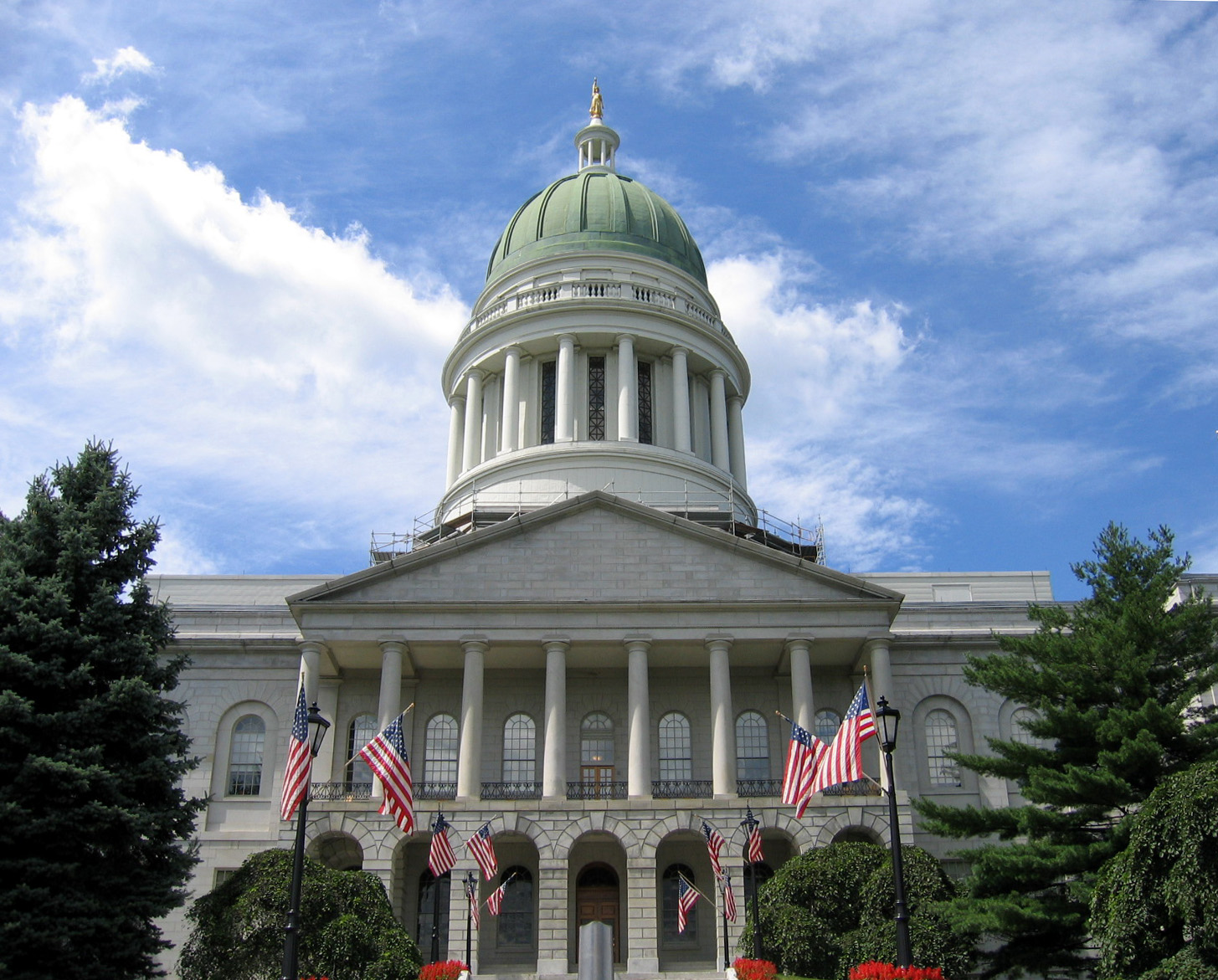
The Maine State House in Augusta

- Capital of the State of Maine
- Capitol of the State of Maine
  - commons:Category:Maine State Capitol
- Census statistical areas of Maine
- Cities in Maine
  - commons:Category:Cities in Maine
- Climate of Maine
- Climate change in Maine

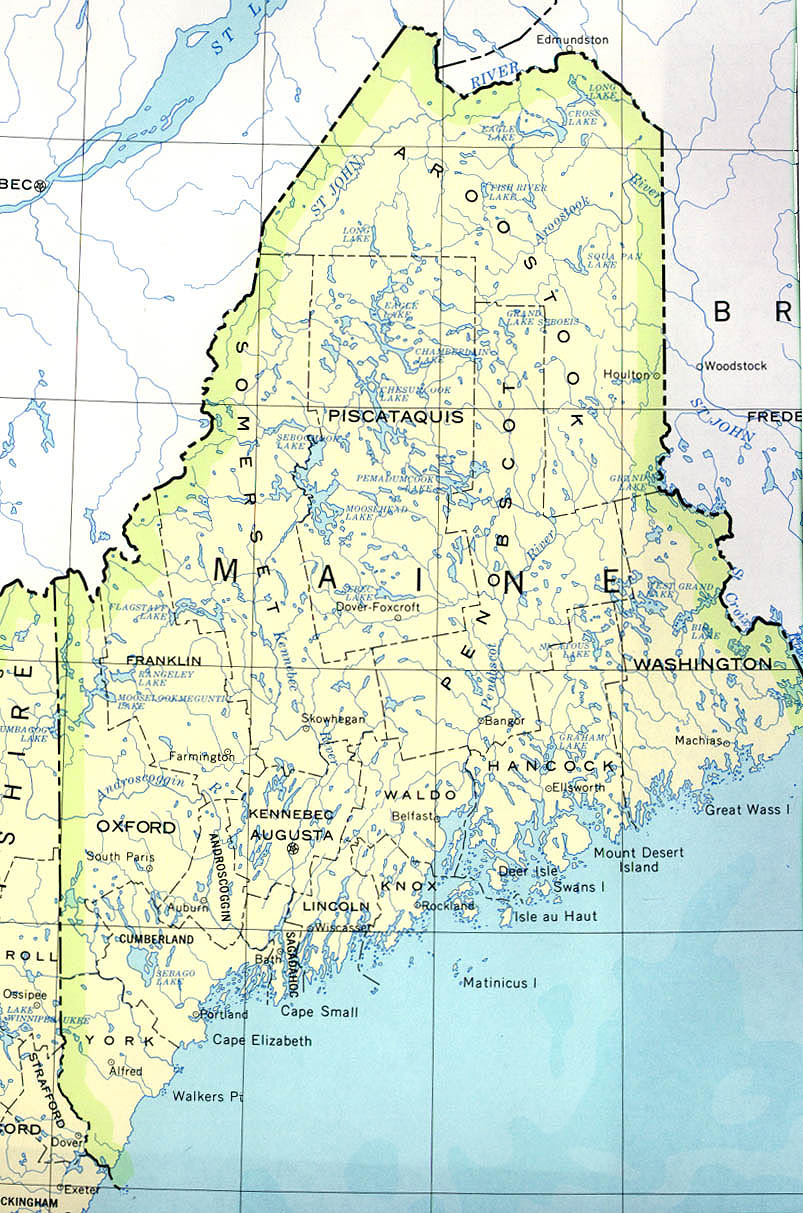
An enlargeable map of the 16 counties of the state of Maine

- Colleges and universities in Maine
  - commons:Category:Universities and colleges in Maine
- Colony of Massachusetts Bay, 1628–1686 and 1689–1692
- Commonwealth of Massachusetts, (1780–1820)
- Communications in Maine
  - commons:Category:Communications in Maine
- Companies in Maine
- Congressional districts of Maine
- Convention centers in Maine
  - commons:Category:Convention centers in Maine
- Counties of the state of Maine
  - commons:Category:Counties in Maine
    - commons:Category:Summer camps in Maine
- County seats in Maine
- Culture of Maine
  - commons:Category:Maine culture

== D ==
- Demographics of Maine
- Domestic partnership in Maine
- Dominion of New-England in America, 1686–1689
- Down East

== E ==
- Economy of Maine
  - Category:Economy of Maine
    - commons:Category:Economy of Maine
- Education in Maine
  - Category:Education in Maine
    - commons:Category:Education in Maine
- Category:Elections in Maine
    - commons:Category:Elections in Maine
- Category:Environment of Maine
  - commons:Category:Environment of Maine

== F ==
The flag of the state of Maine

- Fauna of Maine
- Festivals in Maine
  - commons:Category:Festivals in Maine
- Flag of the state of Maine
- Forts in Maine
  - Category:Forts in Maine
    - commons:Category:Forts in Maine
- French in the United States

== G ==
The Great Seal of the State of Maine

- Geography of Maine
  - Category:Geography of Maine
    - commons:Category:Geography of Maine
- Ghost towns in Maine
  - Category:Ghost towns in Maine
    - commons:Category:Ghost towns in Maine
- Golf clubs and courses in Maine
- Government of the State of Maine website
  - Category:Government of Maine
    - commons:Category:Government of Maine
- Governor of the State of Maine
  - List of governors of Maine
- Great Seal of the State of Maine

== H ==
- Heritage railroads in Maine
  - commons:Category:Heritage railroads in Maine
- High schools of Maine
- Higher education in Maine
- Highway routes in Maine
- Hiking trails in Maine
  - commons:Category:Hiking trails in Maine
- History of Maine
  - Historical outline of Maine
    - Category:History of Maine
      - commons:Category:History of Maine
- Hospitals in Maine
- House of Representatives of the State of Maine

== I ==
- Île Sainte-Croix, first settlement in North America by a European nation other than Spain
- Images of Maine
  - commons:Category:Maine

== L ==
- l'Acadie, 1604–1763
- Lakes of Maine
  - Category:Lakes of Maine
    - commons:Category:Lakes of Maine
- Land patents in Maine
- Landmarks in Maine
  - commons:Category:Landmarks in Maine
- Law of Maine
- Lists related to the state of Maine:
  - LGBT rights in Maine
  - List of airports in Maine
  - List of census statistical areas in Maine
  - List of cities in Maine
  - List of colleges and universities in Maine
  - List of United States congressional districts in Maine
  - List of counties in Maine
  - List of county seats in Maine
  - List of dams and reservoirs in Maine
  - List of forts in Maine
  - List of ghost towns in Maine
  - List of governors of Maine
  - List of high schools in Maine
  - List of highway routes in Maine
  - List of hospitals in Maine
  - List of lakes in Maine
  - List of land patents in Maine
  - List of law enforcement agencies in Maine
  - List of museums in Maine
  - List of National Historic Landmarks in Maine
  - List of New England towns in Maine
  - List of newspapers in Maine
  - List of painters from Maine
  - List of people from Maine
  - List of plantations in Maine
  - List of power stations in Maine
  - List of radio stations in Maine
  - List of railroads in Maine
  - List of Registered Historic Places in Maine
  - List of rivers of Maine
  - List of school districts in Maine
  - List of state forests in Maine
  - List of state parks in Maine
  - List of state prisons in Maine
  - List of symbols of the State of Maine
  - List of telephone area codes in Maine
  - List of television stations in Maine
  - List of towns in Maine
  - List of Maine's congressional delegations
  - List of United States congressional districts in Maine
  - List of United States representatives from Maine
  - List of United States senators from Maine
  - List of unorganized territories in Maine
  - List of Maine Wildlife Areas
  - List of wineries and vineyards in Maine

== M ==
- Maine website
  - Category:Maine
    - commons:Category:Maine
- Maine Guide
- Maine Liquor Law
- Maine Public Employees Retirement System
- Maine School Administrative District 45
- Maine State House
- Maine State Police
- Maps of Maine
  - commons:Category:Maps of Maine
- Mass media in Maine
- ME – United States Postal Service postal code for the State of Maine
- Mid Coast
- Mountains of Maine
  - commons:Category:Mountains of Maine
- Museums in Maine
  - Category:Museums in Maine
    - commons:Category:Museums in Maine
- Music of Maine
  - commons:Category:Music of Maine
  - Category:Musical groups from Maine
  - Category:Musicians from Maine

== N ==
- National Forests of Maine
  - commons:Category:National Forests of Maine
- Natural gas pipelines in Maine
- Natural history of Maine
  - commons:Category:Natural history of Maine
- New England
- New England towns in Maine
- Newspapers of Maine

== P ==
- Painters from Maine
- Pennellville Historic District
- People from Maine
  - Category:People from Maine
    - commons:Category:People from Maine
    - Category:People from Maine by populated place
    - Category:People from Maine by county
- Politics of Maine
  - commons:Category:Politics of Maine
- Portland, Maine, first state capital 1820–1827
- Protected areas of Maine
  - commons:Category:Protected areas of Maine
- Province of Massachusetts Bay, 1691–1776
- Public transportation in Maine

== R ==
- Radio stations in Maine
- Railroad museums in Maine
  - commons:Category:Railroad museums in Maine
- Railroads in Maine
- Registered historic places in Maine
  - commons:Category:Registered Historic Places in Maine
- Religion in Maine
  - Category:Religion in Maine
    - commons:Category:Religion in Maine
- Rivers of Maine
  - commons:Category:Rivers of Maine
- Roller coasters in Maine
  - commons:Category:Roller coasters in Maine

== S ==
- School districts of Maine
- Scouting in Maine
- Senate of the State of Maine
- Settlements in Maine
  - Cities in Maine
  - Towns in Maine
  - Census Designated Places in Maine
  - List of ghost towns in Maine
- Ski areas and resorts in Maine
  - commons:Category:Ski areas and resorts in Maine
- Solar power in Maine
- Sports in Maine
  - commons:Category:Sports in Maine
- Sports venues in Maine
  - commons:Category:Sports venues in Maine
- State of Maine website
  - Government of the State of Maine
    - Category:Government of Maine
      - commons:Category:Government of Maine
  - Executive branch of the government of the State of Maine
    - Governor of the State of Maine
  - Legislative branch of the government of the State of Maine
    - Legislature of the State of Maine
      - Senate of the State of Maine
      - House of Representatives of the State of Maine
  - Judicial branch of the government of the State of Maine
- State of Massachusetts, 1776–1780
- State parks of Maine
  - commons:Category:State parks of Maine
- State Police of Maine
- State prisons of Maine
- Structures in Maine
  - commons:Category:Buildings and structures in Maine
- Symbols of the State of Maine
  - Category:Symbols of Maine
    - commons:Category:Symbols of Maine

== T ==
- Telecommunications in Maine
  - commons:Category:Communications in Maine
- Telephone area codes in Maine
- Television shows set in Maine
- Television stations in Maine
- Theatres in Maine
  - commons:Category:Theatres in Maine
- Tourism in Maine website
  - commons:Category:Tourism in Maine
- Towns in Maine
  - commons:Category:Cities in Maine
- Transportation in Maine
  - Category:Transportation in Maine
    - commons:Category:Transport in Maine

== U ==
- United States of America
  - States of the United States of America
  - United States census statistical areas of Maine
  - Maine's congressional delegations
  - United States congressional districts in Maine
  - United States Court of Appeals for the First Circuit
  - United States District Court for the District of Maine
  - United States representatives from Maine
  - United States senators from Maine
- Universities and colleges in Maine
  - commons:Category:Universities and colleges in Maine
- US-ME – ISO 3166-2:US region code for the State of Maine

== W ==
- Waterfalls in Maine
  - commons:Category:Waterfalls in Maine
  Wikimedia
  - Wikimedia Commons:Category:Maine
    - commons:Category:Maps of Maine
  - Wikinews:Category:Maine
    - Wikinews:Portal:Maine
  - Wikipedia Category:Maine
    - Wikipedia Category:Maine wine
    - Wikipedia Category:Wineries in Maine
    - Wikipedia:WikiProject Maine
      - Category:WikiProject Maine articles
      - Category:WikiProject Maine participants
- Wildlife Management Areas (WMA)
- Wind power in Maine
- Wineries and vineyards in Maine

== See also ==
- Topic overview:
  - Maine
  - Outline of Maine
