= 2025 in Maine =

- Decades: 2000s; 2010s; 2020s
- See also: History of Maine; Historical outline of Maine; List of years in Maine; 2025 in the United States

The following is a list of events of the year 2025 in Maine.

== Incumbents ==
=== State government ===
- Governor: Janet Mills (D)

== Events ==
- 2025 Portland Hearts of Pine season
- February 25 – 2025 Maine House of Representatives District 24 special election
- April 2 – In Sabattus, a passenger in a vehicle fatally shoots his mother, who is driving, before exiting the vehicle and shooting at passing drivers. One motorist is killed and two others are injured before the gunman kills himself.
- July 25 – Immigration and Customs Enforcement (ICE) arrests a reserve officer for the Old Orchard Beach Police Department (OOBPD), accusing him of overstaying his visa. The OOBPD says the Department of Homeland Security approved the officer, from Jamaica, to work in the United States, though ICE disputes this.
- September 16 – The Department of Justice sues Maine and Oregon over their refusal to deliver complete voter rolls to the Trump administration.
- September 18 – Maine and nine other Northeastern states announce the formation of the Northeast Public Health Collaborative, a coalition of local health leaders.

== Deaths ==
- January 29 – John Huard, 80, Hall of Fame football player (Maine Black Bears, Denver Broncos, Toronto Argonauts).
- February 8 – Jerome Plante, 90, politician, member of the Maine House of Representatives (1957–1965).
- February 15 – Kathleen Goodwin, 84, politician, member of the Maine House of Representatives (1969–1978).

== See also ==
- 2025 in the United States
