= Channel 41 =

Channel 41 refers to several television stations:

- One Sports Channel 41 in the Philippines.
- Indosiar, Indonesia on Channel 41 UHF for the Jakarta territories.

== Canada ==
The following television stations formerly broadcast on digital or analog channel 41 (UHF frequencies covering 633.25-637.75 MHz) in Canada:

- CHCH-TV-4 in Sudbury, Ontario
- CICT-DT in Calgary, Alberta
- CIII-DT-41 in Toronto, Ontario
- CIMT-DT-6 in Rivière-du-Loup, Quebec

The following television stations operate on virtual channel 41 in Canada:

- CIII-DT-41 in Toronto, Ontario

== See also ==
- Channel 41 TV stations in Mexico
- Channel 41 digital TV stations in the United States
- Channel 41 virtual TV stations in the United States
- Channel 41 low-power TV stations in the United States
