= Outline of Maine =

Overview of and topical guide to Maine

The flag of Maine

The seal of Maine

The location of the state of Maine in the United States of America

The following outline is provided as an overview of and topical guide to the U.S. state of Maine:

Maine – state in the New England region of the northeastern United States, bordered by the Atlantic Ocean to the east and south, New Hampshire to the west, and the Canadian provinces of Quebec to the northwest and New Brunswick to the northeast. Maine is both the northernmost and easternmost portion of New England. It is known for its scenery—its jagged, mostly rocky coastline, its low, rolling mountains, its heavily forested interior and picturesque waterways—as well as for its seafood cuisine, especially lobsters and clams.

== General reference ==
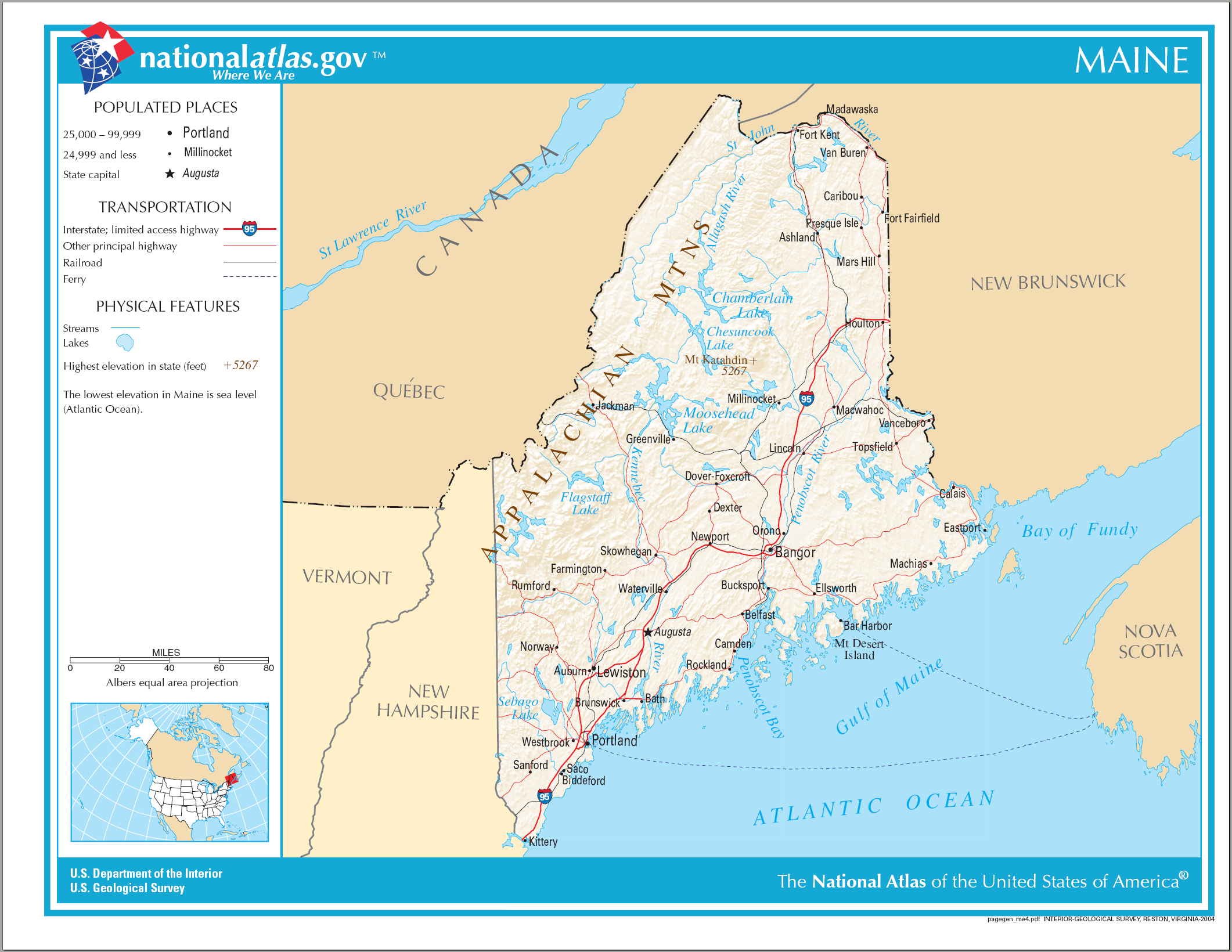
An enlargeable map of the state of Maine

- Names
  - Common name: Maine
    - Pronunciation: /ˈmeɪn/
  - Official name: State of Maine
  - Abbreviations and name codes
    - Postal symbol: ME
    - ISO 3166-2 code: US-ME
    - Internet second-level domain: .me.us
  - Nicknames
    - Vacationland (currently used on license plates)
    - Pine Tree State
- Adjectival: Maine
- Demonyms
  - Mainer
  - Down Easter or Downeaster
  - Mainiac

== Geography of Maine ==
Geography of Maine

- Maine is: a U.S. state, a federal state of the United States of America
- Location
  - Northern Hemisphere
  - Western Hemisphere
    - Americas
      - North America
        - Anglo America
        - Northern America
          - United States of America
            - Contiguous United States
              - Canada–US border
              - Eastern United States
                - East Coast of the United States
                  - Northeastern United States
                    - New England
- Population of Maine: 1,328,361 (2010 U.S. Census)

=== Places in Maine ===
Places in Maine

- Historic places in Maine
  - National Historic Landmarks in Maine
  - National Register of Historic Places listings in Maine
    - Bridges on the National Register of Historic Places in Maine
- National parks in Maine
- State parks in Maine

=== Environment of Maine ===
- Climate of Maine
- Protected areas in Maine
  - State forests of Maine
- Superfund sites in Maine
- Wildlife of Maine
  - Fauna of Maine

==== Natural geographic features of Maine ====
- Islands of Maine
- Lakes of Maine
- Mountains of Maine
- Rivers of Maine

=== Regions of Maine ===
- Southern Maine
- The County

==== Administrative divisions of Maine ====
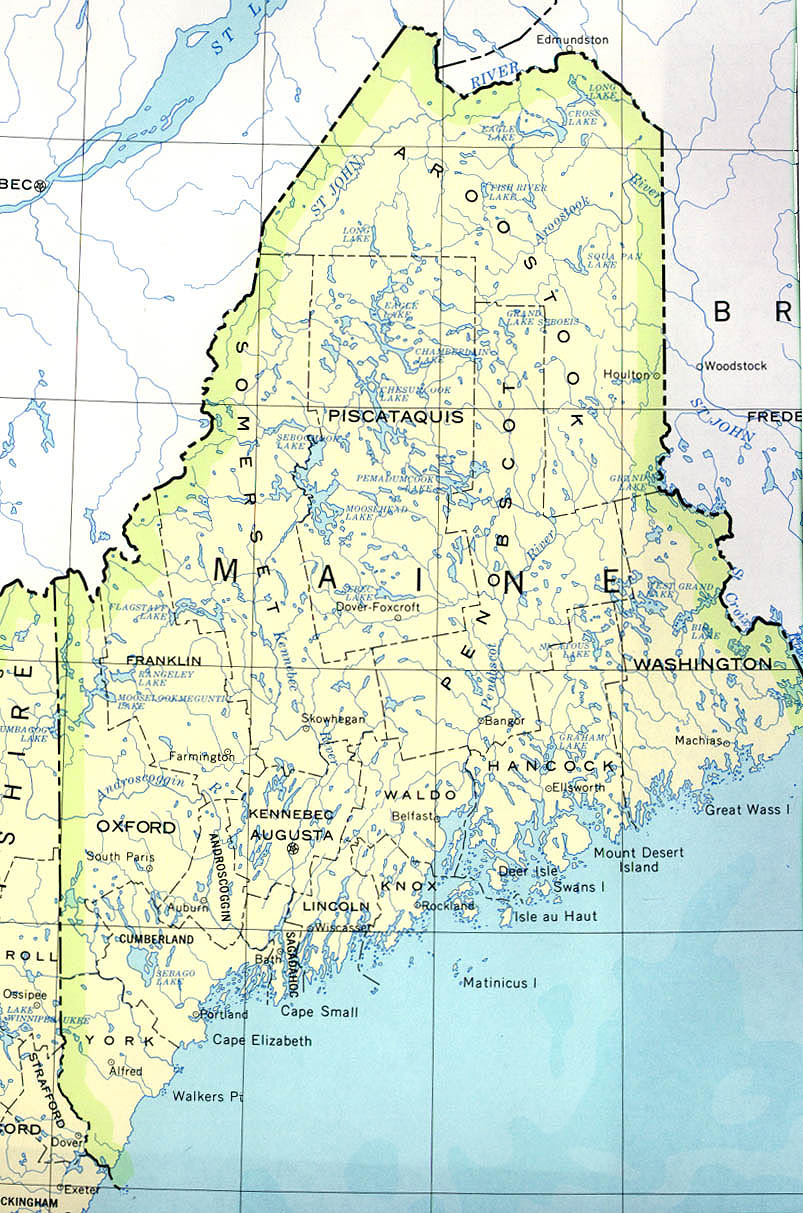
An enlargeable map of the 16 counties of the state of Maine

- The 16 counties of the state of Maine
  - Municipalities in Maine
    - Cities in Maine
      - State capital of Maine:
      - City nicknames in Maine
    - Towns in Maine

=== Demography of Maine ===
Demographics of Maine

== Government and politics of Maine ==
Politics of Maine

- Form of government: U.S. state government
- Maine's congressional delegations
- Maine State Capitol
- Elections in Maine
  - Electoral reform in Maine
- Political party strength in Maine

=== Branches of the government of Maine ===
Government of Maine

==== Executive branch of the government of Maine ====
- Governor of Maine
  - Lieutenant Governor of Maine
  - Secretary of State of Maine
- State departments
  - Maine Department of Transportation

==== Legislative branch of the government of Maine ====
- Maine Legislature (bicameral)
  - Upper house: Maine Senate
  - Lower house: Maine House of Representatives

==== Judicial branch of the government of Maine ====
Courts of Maine

- Supreme Court of Maine

=== Law and order in Maine ===
Law of Maine

- Cannabis in Maine
- Capital punishment in Maine
- Constitution of Maine
- Gun laws in Maine
- Law enforcement in Maine
  - Law enforcement agencies in Maine
    - Maine State Police
- Same-sex marriage in Maine

=== Military in Maine ===
- Maine Air National Guard
- Maine Army National Guard

== History of Maine ==
History of Maine

=== History of Maine, by period ===
The location of the state of Maine in the United States of America

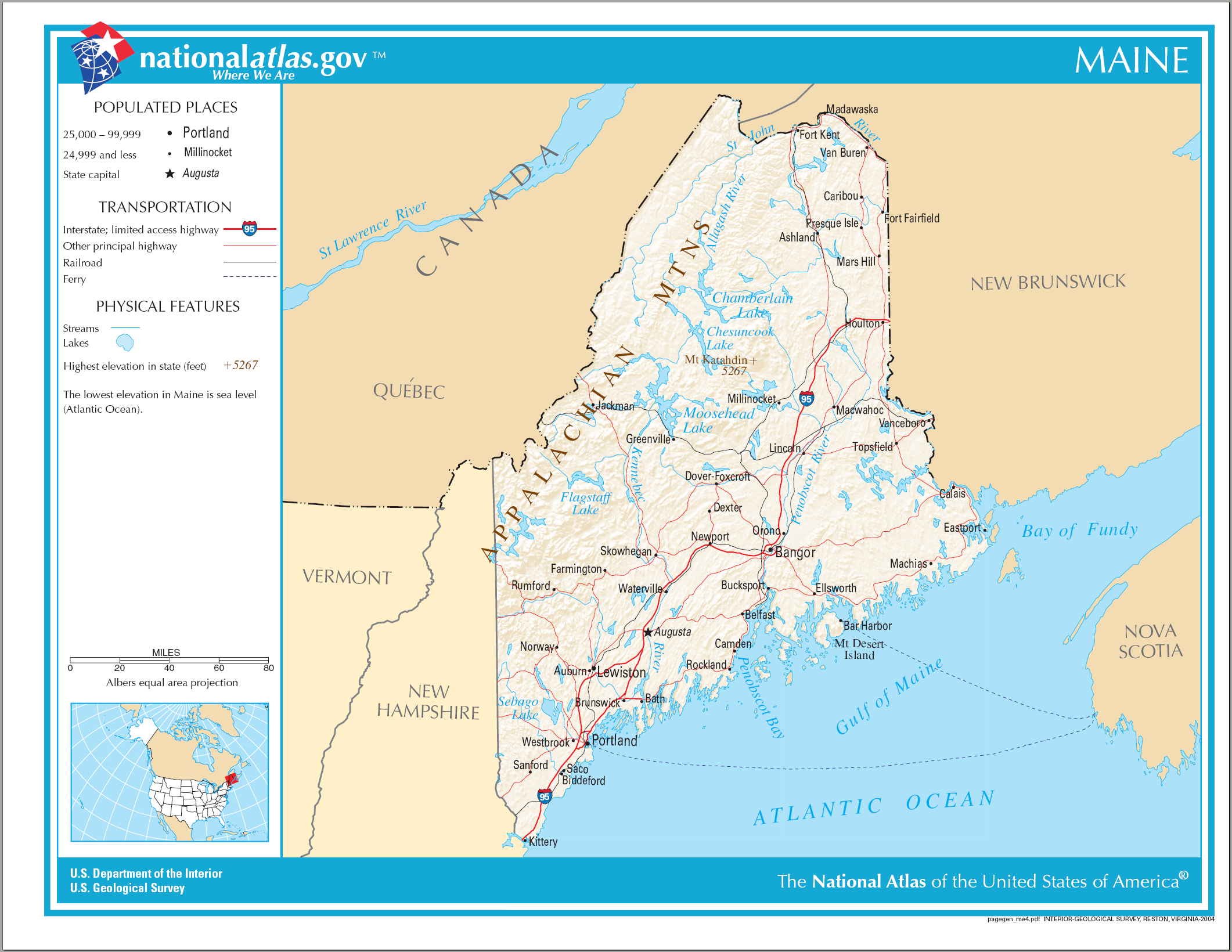
An enlargeable map of the state of Maine

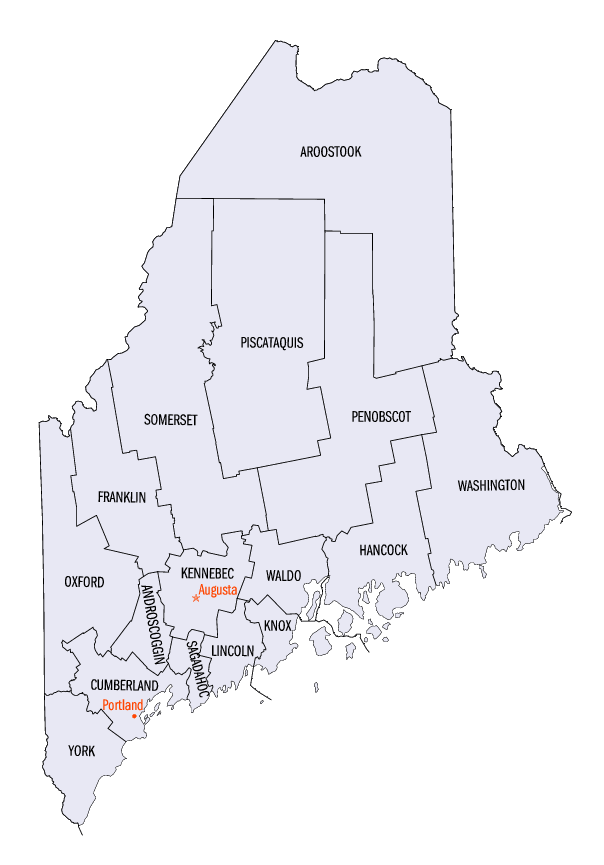
An enlargeable map of the 16 counties of the state of Maine

- Prehistory of Maine
- French colony of l'Acadie, 1604–1713
  - Île Sainte-Croix, 1604–1605
  - King William's War, 1690–1697
  - Queen Anne's War, 1702–1713
  - Treaty of Utrecht, 1713
  - Le Grand Dérangement, 1755–1763
- English Colony of Popham, 1607–1608
- English Colony of Massachusetts Bay, 1628–1686
  - Also claimed by English Colony of New-York, 1664–1673 and 1674–1683
  - King Philip's War, 1675–1676
    - Also claimed by English Province of New-York, 1683–1688
- English Dominion of New-England in America, 1686–1689
- English Colony of Massachusetts Bay, 1689–1692
  - Also claimed by English Province of New-York, 1689–1692
- English Province of Massachusetts Bay, 1692–1707
- British Province of Massachusetts Bay, 1707–1776
- King George's War, 1740–1748
  - Treaty of Aix-la-Chapelle of 1748
- French and Indian War, 1754–1763
  - Treaty of Paris of 1763
- British Colony of Nova Scotia east of Penobscot River, 1707-(1765–1776)-1867
- State of Massachusetts Bay, 1776–1780
- Separation of Maine from Massachusetts in 1820
- State of Maine becomes 23rd State admitted to the United States of America on March 15, 1820
  - Republic of Madawaska, 1827–1842
  - Aroostook War, 1838–1839
  - American Civil War, April 12, 1861 – May 13, 1865
    - Maine in the American Civil War
  - Acadia National Park established on February 26, 1919

=== History of Maine, by region ===
- by city
  - History of Portland, Maine
    - Railroad history of Portland, Maine

=== History of Maine, by subject ===
- History of Albanians in Maine
- List of Maine state legislatures

== Culture of Maine ==
- Cuisine of Maine
- Museums in Maine
- Religion in Maine
  - Episcopal Diocese of Maine
- Scouting in Maine
- State symbols of Maine
  - Flag of the State of Maine
  - Original 1901 Maine Flag
  - Great Seal of the State of Maine

=== The arts in Maine ===
- Music of Maine

=== Sports in Maine ===
Sports in Maine

== Economy and infrastructure of Maine ==
Economy of Maine

- Communications in Maine
  - Newspapers in Maine
  - Radio stations in Maine
  - Television stations in Maine
- Energy in Maine
  - Power stations in Maine
  - Solar power in Maine
  - Wind power in Maine
- Health care in Maine
  - Hospitals in Maine
- Transportation in Maine
  - Airports in Maine
  - Rail transport in Maine
  - Roadways in Maine
    - State highways in Maine
    - State routes in Maine

== Education in Maine ==
Education in Maine

- Schools in Maine
  - School districts in Maine
    - High schools in Maine
  - Colleges and universities in Maine
    - University of Maine

== See also ==
- Topic overview:
  - Maine
  - Index of Maine-related articles
