= 2026 in Maine =

- Decades: 2000s; 2010s; 2020s
- See also: History of Maine; Historical outline of Maine; List of years in Maine; 2026 in the United States

The following is a list of events of the year 2026 in Maine.

== Incumbents ==
=== State government ===
- Governor: Janet Mills (D)

== Events ==
- January 20 – A surge in immigration enforcement begins in Maine, primarily in the cities of Lewiston and Portland. The operation is titled "Operation Catch of the Day".
- January 25 – Six people are killed when a private jet crashes at Bangor International Airport.
- April 30 – Governor Janet Mills announces she is suspending her campaign for Senate.
- May 15 – Two firefighters are killed and at least 10 people are injured in an explosion at a lumber mill in Searsmont. One of the injured dies of his injuries in July.
- May 20 – U.S. Senator Angus King argues that Centers for Medicare & Medicaid Services should provide every Medicare recipient with bath mats as a cost-effective preventative measure to reduce spending on fall injuries.
- May 26 – A ballot initiative that would have restricted transgender students from participating in sports is declared ineligible and removed from the ballot due to invalid signatures.
- May 30 – Senate Democratic candidate Graham Platner is accused of sending sexually explicit texts to women during his campaign while he was married.
- July 6 – Politico reports that a woman has accused Graham Platner of sexually assaulting her when the two were dating in 2021.
- July 8 – Graham Platner announces he is ending his Senate campaign.
- July 13 – ICE agents fatally shoot 26-year-old Joan Sebastian Guerrero in Biddeford.
- November 3 – 2026 Maine elections:
  - 2026 Maine House of Representatives election
  - 2026 Maine State Senate election
  - 2026 Maine gubernatorial election: Former Maine House Speaker Hannah Pingree wins the election, beating opponents Robert B. Charles and Rick Bennett.
  - 2026 United States House of Representatives elections in Maine: Troy Jackson wins the election, beating longtime Senator Susan Collins.

== See also ==
- 2026 in the United States
