= 2023 in Maine =

- Decades: 2000s; 2010s; 2020s
- See also: History of Maine; Historical outline of Maine; List of years in Maine; 2023 in the United States

The following is a list of events of the year 2023 in Maine.

== Incumbents ==
=== State government ===
- Governor: Janet Mills (D)

== Events ==
- January 1 – Three officers with the New York City Police Department are wounded in a machete attack during New Year's Eve celebrations in Times Square. The suspect, a 19-year-old male from Maine, is also wounded and has been arrested, with jihadist motives being suspected.
- October 25 – 2023 Lewiston shootings: Multiple shootings in Lewiston, leave at least 18 people dead and dozens more injured.
- October 27 – Authorities in Maine confirm the death of Robert Card, the suspected perpetrator of a mass shooting that killed 18 in Lewiston, with indications of a self-inflicted gunshot wound.

== See also ==
- 2024 in the United States
