= 2024 in Maine =

- Decades: 2000s; 2010s; 2020s
- See also: History of Maine; Historical outline of Maine; List of years in Maine; 2024 in the United States

The following is a list of events of the year 2024 in Maine.

== Incumbents ==
=== State government ===
- Governor: Janet Mills (D)

== Events ==
- January 13 – 2024 Portland flood
- March 5 – Super Tuesday:
  - 2024 Maine Democratic presidential primary.
  - 2024 Maine Republican presidential primary.
- November 5 – The 2024 Maine Question 5 vote occurred. If enacted, it would change the official state flag from the current version, first enacted in 1909, to a variation of the 1901 flag. The vote later failed, with 55% of voters voting against the proposed change, and 45% voting for the change.

== See also ==
- 2024 in the United States
