= Channel 41 low-power TV stations in the United States =

The following low-power television stations broadcast on digital or analog channel 41 in the United States:

- K41HQ-D in Quanah, Texas, to move to channel 24
- WFYW-LP in Waterville, Maine, to move to channel 35

The following stations, which are no longer licensed, formerly broadcast on digital or analog channel 41:

- K41AF in Ukiah, California
- K41BW-D in New Mobeetie, Texas
- K41CB in Lucerne Valley, California
- K41CK in Ellensburg, Washington
- K41DC in Eureka, Utah
- K41FK in Tohatchi, New Mexico
- K41FQ in Springfield, Missouri
- K41FX in Spring Glen, Utah
- K41GI-D in Imlay, Nevada
- K41GT in Myton, Utah
- K41GV in Emery, Utah
- K41HH-D in Austin, Nevada
- K41HZ in Burns, Oregon
- K41IX in Medford, Oregon
- K41JE in Williams-Ashfork, Arizona
- K41JF-D in Hagerman, Idaho
- K41KZ-D in Chalfant Valley, California
- K41MX-D in Perryton, Texas
- KEYU-LP in Amarillo, Texas
- KJCX-LP in Helena, Montana
- KLMW-LD in Lufkin, Texas
- KMMA-CD in San Luis Obispo, California
- KNVV-LP in Reno, Nevada
- KPVM-LP in Pahrump, Nevada
- KQLP-LD in Lincoln, Nebraska
- KTJX-LD in College Station, Texas
- KXOC-LP in Oklahoma City, Oklahoma
- W41AO in Hampshire, etc., West Virginia
- W41AP in Sandusky, Ohio
- WFRW-LD in Enterprise, Alabama
- WLFW-LP in Lafayette, Georgia
- WRGX-LP in Dothan, Alabama
- WRZY-LD in Buxton, North Carolina
