= Channel 41 digital TV stations in the United States =

The following television stations broadcast on digital channel 41 in the United States:

- K41HQ-D in Quanah, Texas, to move to channel 24
- WFYW-LP in Waterville, Maine, to move to channel 35

The following stations, which are no longer licensed, formerly broadcast on digital channel 41:

- K41BW-D in New Mobeetie, Texas
- K41GI-D in Imlay, Nevada
- K41HH-D in Austin, Nevada
- K41JF-D in Hagerman, Idaho
- K41KZ-D in Chalfant Valley, California
- K41MX-D in Perryton, Texas
- KLMW-LD in Lufkin, Texas
- KMMA-CD in San Luis Obispo, California
- KQLP-LD in Lincoln, Nebraska
- KTJX-LD in College Station, Texas
- WFRW-LD in Enterprise, Alabama
- WIFR in Freeport, Illinois
- WRZY-LD in Buxton, North Carolina
