= Kathleen Goodwin =

American politician (1940–2025)

Kathleen Watson Goodwin (November 13, 1940 – February 15, 2025) was an American politician who served five terms in the Maine House of Representatives, from 1968 to 1978. Goodwin was a Democrat. Goodwin died on February 15, 2025, at the age of 84.
