= Maine statistical areas =

Coordinates: 45.3695°N 69.2428°W

The U.S. State of Maine currently has five statistical areas that have been delineated by the Office of Management and Budget (OMB). On July 21, 2023, the OMB delineated one combined statistical area, three metropolitan statistical areas, and one micropolitan statistical area in Maine. As of 2025, the largest of these is the Portland–Lewiston–South Portland, ME CSA, comprising the region around Maine's largest city of Portland.

== Statistical areas ==
The Office of Management and Budget (OMB) has designated more than 1,000 statistical areas for the United States and Puerto Rico. These statistical areas are important geographic delineations of population clusters used by the OMB, the United States Census Bureau, planning organizations, and federal, state, and local government entities.

The OMB defines a core-based statistical area (commonly referred to as a CBSA) as the county or counties (or county-equivalents) surrounding at least one densely-settled core of at least 10,000 population, "plus adjacent counties having a high degree of social and economic integration with the core as measured through commuting ties with the counties containing the core". The OMB further divides core-based statistical areas based on population into metropolitan statistical areas (MSAs) for those with at least 50,000 and micropolitan statistical areas (μSAs) for those with 10,000 to 49,999 people.

The OMB defines a combined statistical area (CSA) as two or more adjacent core-based statistical areas where the employment interchange rate (% commuting from A to B plus % commuting from B to A) is at least 15%. The primary statistical areas (PSAs) include all combined statistical areas and any core-based statistical area that is not a constituent of a combined statistical area.

The five United States statistical areas and 16 counties of the State of Maine
Combined statistical area	2025 population (est.)	Core-based statistical area	2025 population (est.)	County	2025 population (est.)
Portland–Lewiston–South Portland, ME CSA	694,122	Portland–South Portland, ME MSA	577,635	Cumberland County, Maine	317,222
Portland–Lewiston–South Portland, ME CSA	694,122	Portland–South Portland, ME MSA	577,635	York County, Maine	222,434
Portland–Lewiston–South Portland, ME CSA	694,122	Portland–South Portland, ME MSA	577,635	Sagadahoc County, Maine	37,979
Portland–Lewiston–South Portland, ME CSA	694,122	Lewiston–Auburn, ME MSA	116,487	Androscoggin County, Maine	116,487
none		Bangor, ME MSA	157,967	Penobscot County, Maine	157,967
none		Augusta–Waterville, ME μSA	129,607	Kennebec County, Maine	129,607
none		none		Aroostook County, Maine	66,609
none		none		Oxford County, Maine	60,346
none		none		Hancock County, Maine	57,171
none		none		Somerset County, Maine	51,620
none		none		Knox County, Maine	41,117
none		none		Waldo County, Maine	40,693
none		none		Lincoln County, Maine	36,595
none		none		Washington County, Maine	31,334
none		none		Franklin County, Maine	30,824
none		none		Piscataquis County, Maine	17,409
State of Maine					1,414,874

The four core-based statistical areas of the State of Maine
2025 rank	Core-based statistical area	Population				
2025 rank	Core-based statistical area	2025 estimate	Change	2020 Census	Change	2010 Census
1	Portland–South Portland, ME MSA	577,635	+4.69%	551,740	+7.32%	514,098
2	Bangor, ME MSA	157,967	+3.79%	152,199	−1.12%	153,923
3	Augusta–Waterville, ME μSA	129,607	+4.82%	123,642	+1.22%	122,151
4	Lewiston–Auburn, ME MSA	116,487	+4.81%	111,139	+3.19%	107,702

The one combined statistical area of the State of Maine
2025 rank	Combined statistical area	Population				
2025 rank	Combined statistical area	2025 estimate	Change	2020 Census	Change	2010 Census
1	Portland–Lewiston–South Portland, ME CSA	694,122	+4.71%	662,879	+6.61%	621,800

== See also ==
- Geography of Maine
  - Demographics of Maine
