= Seal of Maine =

Official government emblem of the U.S. state of Maine

Great Seal of Maine
- Armiger: State of Maine
- Adopted: June 15, 1820
- Motto: Dirigo (Latin: "I direct" or "I lead")

Coat of arms of Maine

Versions
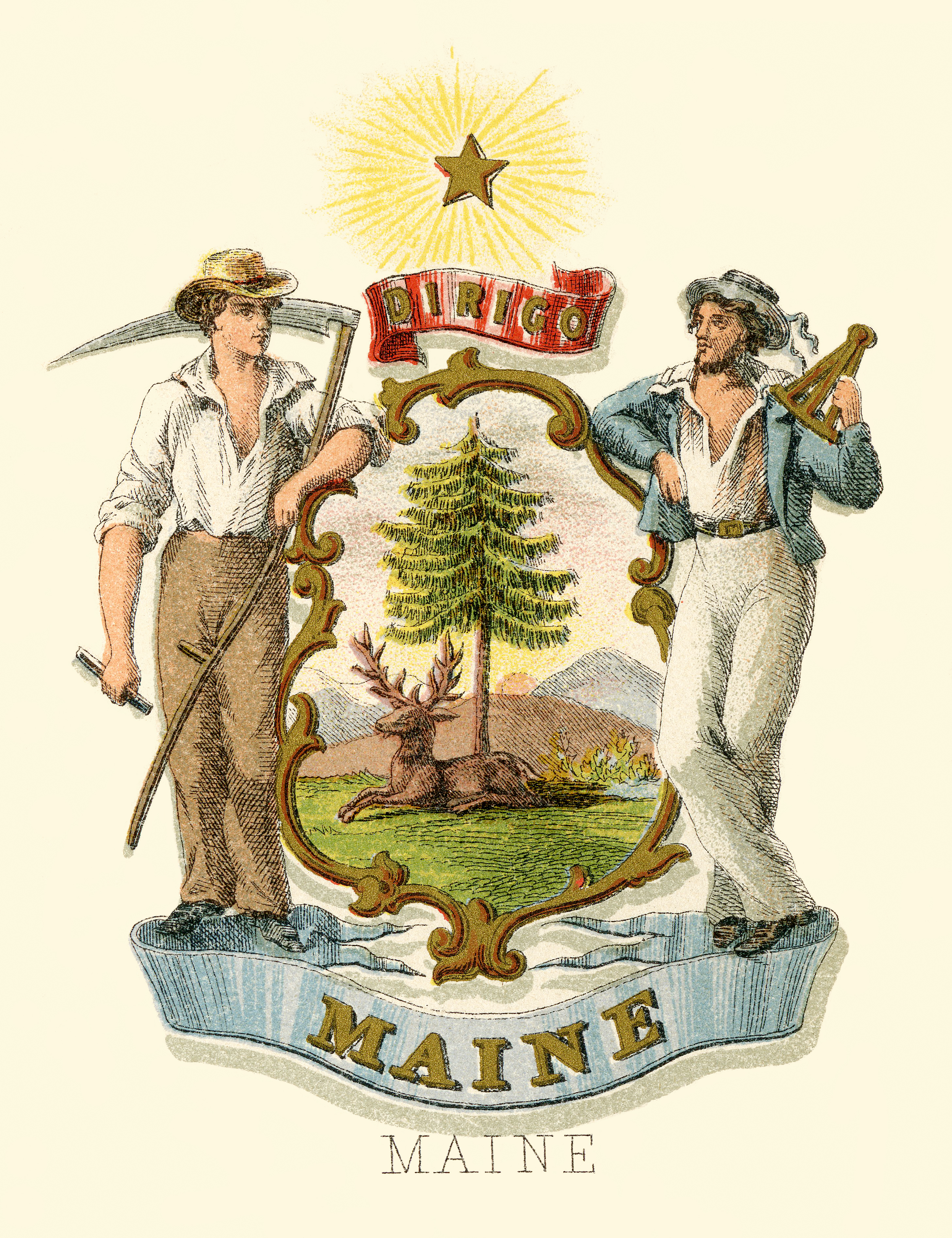
- Historical coat of arms (1876)

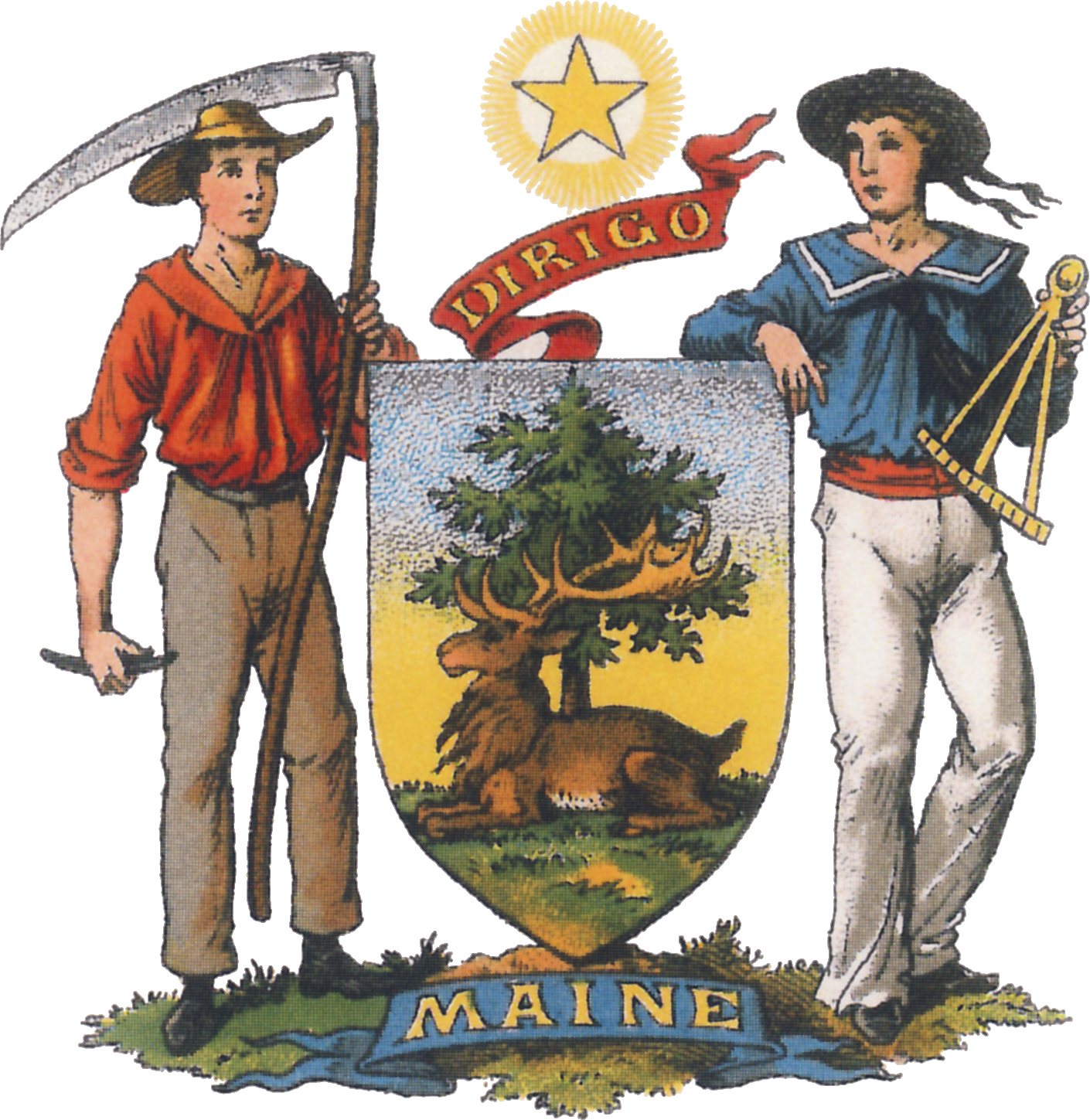
- Coat of arms according to Ströhl, 1899
- Armiger: State of Maine
- Adopted: June 9, 1820
- Crest: A mullet (the North Star), shining Or
- Shield: Argent, charged with a pine tree (Americana, quinis ex uno folliculo setis) with a moose (cervus alces), at the foot of it, recumbent
- Supporters: On dexter side, a husbandman, resting on a scythe; on sinister side, a seaman, resting on an anchor
- Compartment: In the foreground, representing sea and land, and under the shield, the name of the State in large Roman capitals, to wit: MAINE
- Motto: Dirigo (Latin: "I direct" or "I lead")

The Great Seal of the State of Maine was adopted in June 1820. The concept of the design is attributed to Benjamin Vaughan of Hallowell, Maine, while the original sketch is credited to Bertha Smouse, the step-daughter of Col. Isaac Reed of Waldoboro, Maine, who purportedly wrote its official description and explanation. There have been variations in the details of the seal, but the overall design and images remain true to the original. The center of the seal is a shield adorned with a tranquil scene of a moose resting in a field bordered by water and woods; a pine tree stands tall directly behind the moose. On either side of the shield, a farmer rests on his scythe, and a sailor leans on an anchor. Above the shield is the motto "Dirigo" (I direct) and a stylized North Star. Below the shield is a banner that reads "Maine". The legislature of 1919 decided that the design of the seal should no longer vary, and the design is still used today.

== Motto ==
Dīrigō (Latin "I direct" or "I lead") is the state motto of Maine, having once been the only state to hold its elections in September. (Politicians kept their eyes on these elections for evidence of a trend. Prior to the New Deal, Republicans claimed "As Maine goes, so goes the nation.")

The resolution adopting the seal upon which this motto appears gives insight into its meaning: "...as the Polar Star has been considered the mariner's guide and director in conducting the ship over the pathless ocean to the desired haven, and as the center of magnetic attraction; as it has been figuratively used to denote the point, to which all affections turn, and as it is here intended to represent the State, it may be considered the citizens' guide, and the object to which the patriot's best exertions should be directed".

The motto and seal are used by the University of Maine. The motto was also used for the name of the Dirigo Health Agency which oversaw the state of Maine's health care system before the passage of the Affordable Care Act.

== Design ==
As stated in Maine law, Title 1 Section 201: The seal of the State shall be a shield, argent, charged with a pine tree (Americana, quinis ex uno folliculo setis) with a moose (cervus alces), at the foot of it, recumbent; supporters: on dexter side, a husbandman, resting on a scythe; on sinister side, a seaman, resting on an anchor. In the foreground, representing sea and land, and under the shield, shall be the name of the State in large Roman capitals, to wit: MAINE. The whole shall be surrounded by a crest, the North Star. The motto, in small Roman capitals, shall be in a label interposed between the shield and crest, viz.: DIRIGO.

Shortly after Maine became a state, the official state seal was adopted on June 9, 1820. Although "there are no records indicating how the motto was developed or selected", according to David Chever, former Maine State archivist and vice chairman of Maine's Bicentennial Committee, it is known that William Moody of Saco, who was the first president of the Maine Senate, oversaw the process. Isaac Reed is credited with having written the description and explanation of the seal:

"The motto, in small Roman capitals, shall be in a label (that reads) DIRIGO." The label would be located between the star – "the mariner's guide ... over the pathless ocean to the desired haven" – and a shield featuring a moose, a pine tree, a farmer and a sailor.

— Kelley Bouchard, Portland Press Herald, quoting Reed

Although originally from Waldoboro, Massachusetts, Reed was opposed to Maine becoming a state. In April 1816, he moved his family into a Mansion on Glidden in Waldoboro, Maine, historically named: the Reed Mansion. It was there that Reed and his step-daughter, Bertha Smouse, purportedly worked on the seal together. It has been noted, however, how ironic Reed's involvement was at the time, since he campaigned fellow townsfolk to vote against Maine becoming a state. A 2005 National House Register application for the Reed Mansion states: "When sent by the town to the 1816 Constitutional Convention in Brunswick, Reed argued strongly against separation from Massachusetts, as he did again in Portland in 1819".

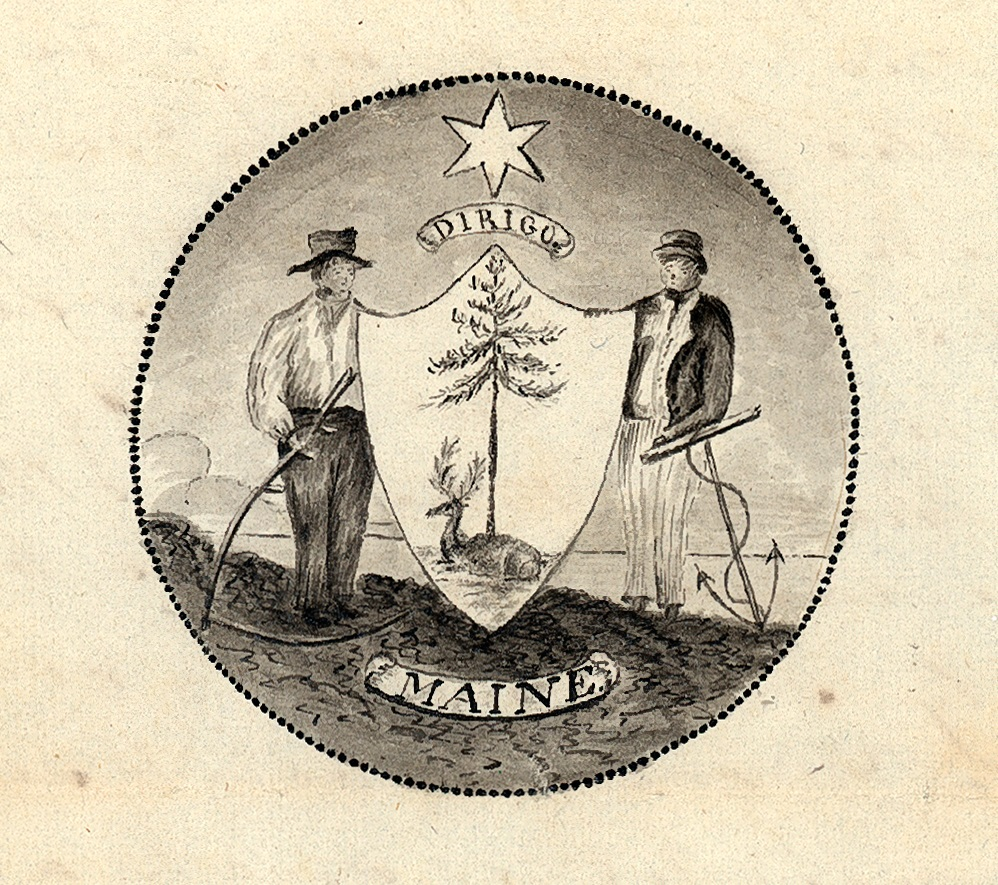
First State Seal design submitted to the Legislature sub-committee

While the explanation of the seal is credited to Reed, the original first draft of the design is credited to Dr. Benjamin Vaughan from Hallowell, Maine. A distinguished doctor with degrees from Harvard University and Bowdoin College, Vaughan's reputation as a learned man was well known. His private library alone was equal to the size of Harvard's. Publishing numerous articles, Vaughan devoted his life to building mills, stores, printing-offices, breweries, and advocating toward the Settlement of Kennebec County. Drawing details from Reed's description, Vaughan submitted a preliminary sketch to the legislature sub-committee. The design was nearly unanimously rejected for various reasons: the moose looked "more like a deer", and one committee member complained that his initial desire that the aurora borealis and a quote from St. Paul was not included. Despite the fact that a state seal was needed for immediate use on official documents, according to historian William D. Williamson, "no part of it was very ingeniously wrought or executed; hence people of taste and judgment have not been altogether pleased with the devices, or emblems".

How it finally came to approval is unknown; but since that time, various stories, printed articles and even Maine towns have disputed authorship over the original sketch design. On June 12, 1820, The Portland Gazette reported: "We understand that the emblems for the seal of the State were proposed by Benjamin Vaughan, Esq. of Hallowell, that the sketch was executed by a young lady in this town, and that the Motto, description, explanation, &c are from the pen of Col. Isaac G. Reed, a member of the House of Representatives from Waldoborough."

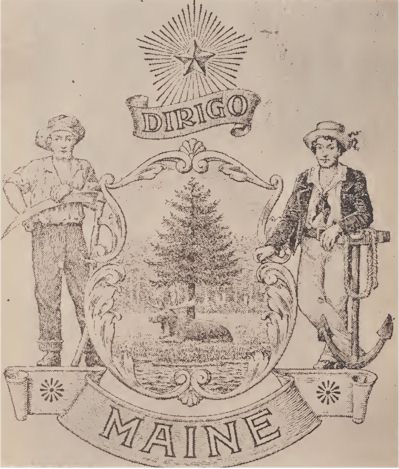
More commonly recognized Seal of Maine design

However, in 2020, in celebration of Maine's bicentennial, a contest was announced in partnership with the Vaughan Woods & Historical Homestead that sought a modern interpretation of the original Maine state seal. The winning submission would be hung over the mantel in the Benjamin Vaughan Homestead dining room. In the Sun Journal, Vaughan is quoted to have proposed the emblems, and one of his own daughters crudely fashioned the original sketch at their dining room table: "We are the most northern state in the Union, yet what is an ordinary star for all other states becomes the North Star for us." Maine Historical Society Bicentennial Education Fellow, Brittany Cook, stated in a 2020 virtual hub, that the new state of Maine turned to a man named Vaughan to design the state seal, and his daughter is said to have sketched the first design.

Although Maine state historian Herb Adams also says that a sub-committee of the Maine legislature turned to Vaughan to design the seal, President of the Waldoboro Historical Society, Jean B. Lawrence, states that the step-daughter of Isaac Reed, Bertha Smouse, created the original design by stitching it in needlework. When referenced, Bertha Smouse is believed or credited as having created the state seal.

On March 26, 2020, the trustees of the Waldoborough Historical Society announced that they had been chosen to receive funding to erect a sign outside of the former site of the Reed Mansion in Waldoboro, Maine to commemorate the "1820 State Seal Visual gift of Bertha Smouse". According to Lawrence, a 17 year old Smouse created a "needlework visual" from a list of suggestions given by her father.

In 1930, the Maine Library Bulletin discovered that "it is generally conceded that (Reed) was the author of the detailed and somewhat flowery description of the (seal) and the symbols comprising it. It is said that the final sketch presented with the report (to the Legislature) was the work of Miss Bertha Smouse, a step-daughter of Colonel Reed". The bulletin went to reveal that no descendant of Reed's could confirm any family members' participation in designing the seal. According to the National Register application, "while (Bertha Smouse) could have had a hand in drawing the seal, there is no evidence to support this claim". In section 8, page 4 of the Registration Form received on June 22, 2005, to place the Reed Mansion on the National Register of Historic Places, the submitted claim for significance states: "It is said that the final sketch presented with the report, a parchment copy of which was placed in the office of the Secretary of State, was the work of Mss Bertha Smouse, a step-daughter of Colonel Reed. Bertha Smouse would have been between 16 and 20 years old at that time and while she could have had a hand in drawing the seal, there is no evidence to support this claim."

Currently, in the Maine state archives, attached to the original Maine legislation is the original sketch for the 1820 Official Coat of Arms; however, there is no documented proof of authorship assigned to the drawing. According to Dave Martucci, the more recognized design was drawn in 1919; and attributed to illustrator Henry Gibson. The seal went through various stages of design through the 1800s; however, the initial elements described in 1820 remain.

The State of Maine first adopted its state flag in 1901; which consisted of only a central pine tree with a blue star in the left corner on a neutral backdrop. In 1909, the state adopted a new flag design using the state seal on a navy blue backdrop.

== Other symbols of Maine ==
Seal of the governor of Maine

Seal of the Maine State Planning Office

Seal of the Maine treasurer

Seal of the Maine Department of Administrative and Financial Services

Seal of the Maine Department of Professional and Financial Regulation

Seal of the Maine Department of Public Safety

Seal of the Maine Bureau of Highway Safety

Seal of the Maine Department of Marine Resources

Seal of the Maine Bureau of Veterans Services

== See also ==
- List of Maine state symbols
- Flag of Maine
