= List of Maine state forests =

The following is a list of Maine state forests.

== Maine state forests ==
Name (by alphabetical order)	Location (of main entrance)
Durham State Forest	Waldo County

== See also ==
- List of national forests of the United States
