= Solar power in Maine =

Overview of solar power in the U.S. state of Maine

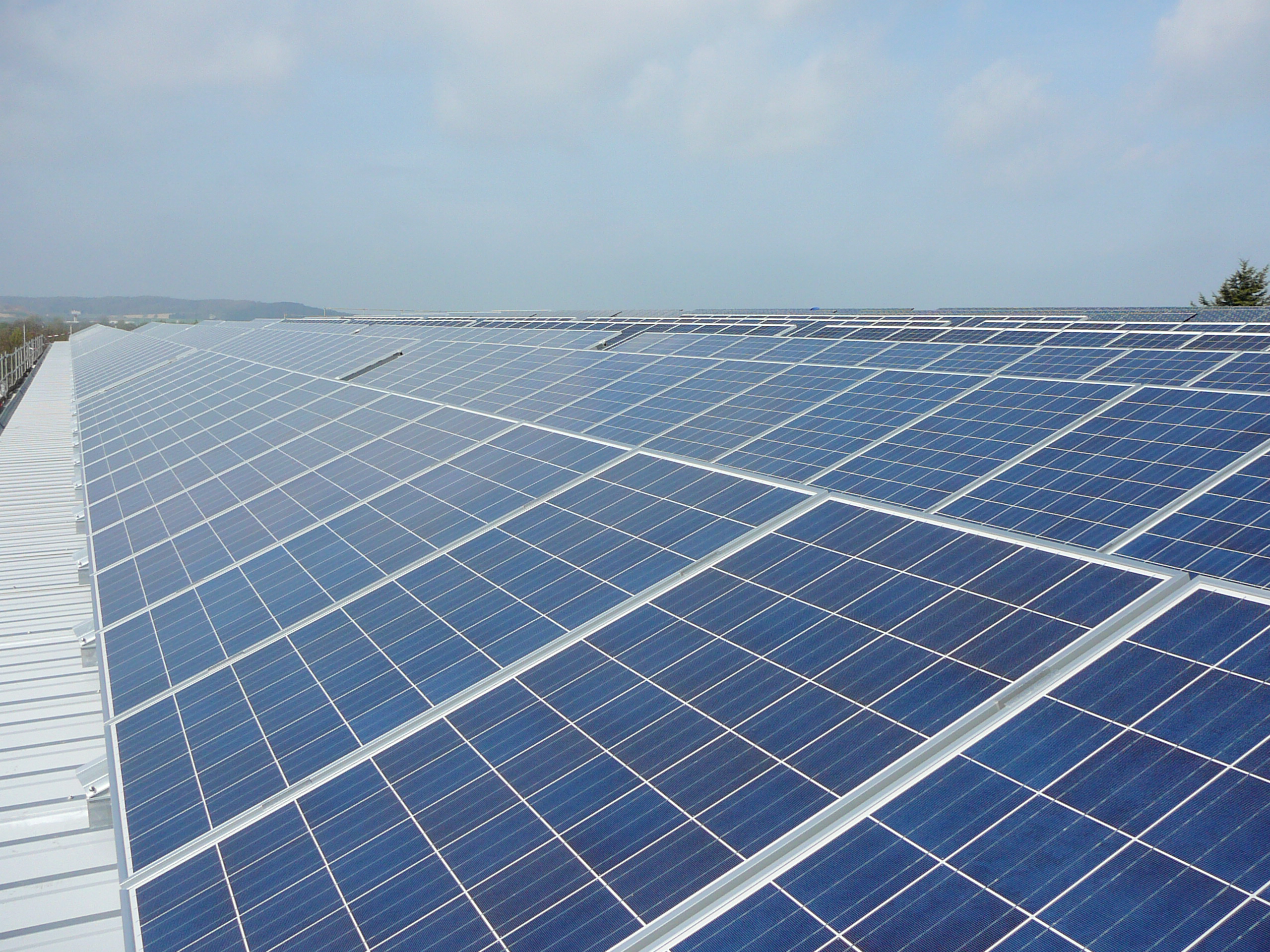
Solar panels

Solar power in Maine on rooftops, utilizing 6,300 megawatts (MW) of solar panels, can provide 60% of the electricity used in Maine according to a 2016 U.S. Department of Energy study. Maine and Vermont are tied for the second highest rooftop solar potential in the country, only behind the state of California. A 2020 estimate suggests that a typical 5.6 kilowatt (kW) residential system will pay for itself in 6-7 years and generate a profit of $45,000 over the rest of its 25-year life from the tax credits and utility savings.

Net metering is available to all consumers for up to at least 100 kW generation. Excess generation is rolled over each month but is lost at the end of each year. Maine provides a range of additional programs to incentive efficient energy use, as well as promote the transition to solar and other forms of renewable energy.

== Statistics ==
=== Installed capacity ===
Solar insolation in Maine is roughly 33% greater than Germany, the leader in solar installations in 2012.

Source: NREL

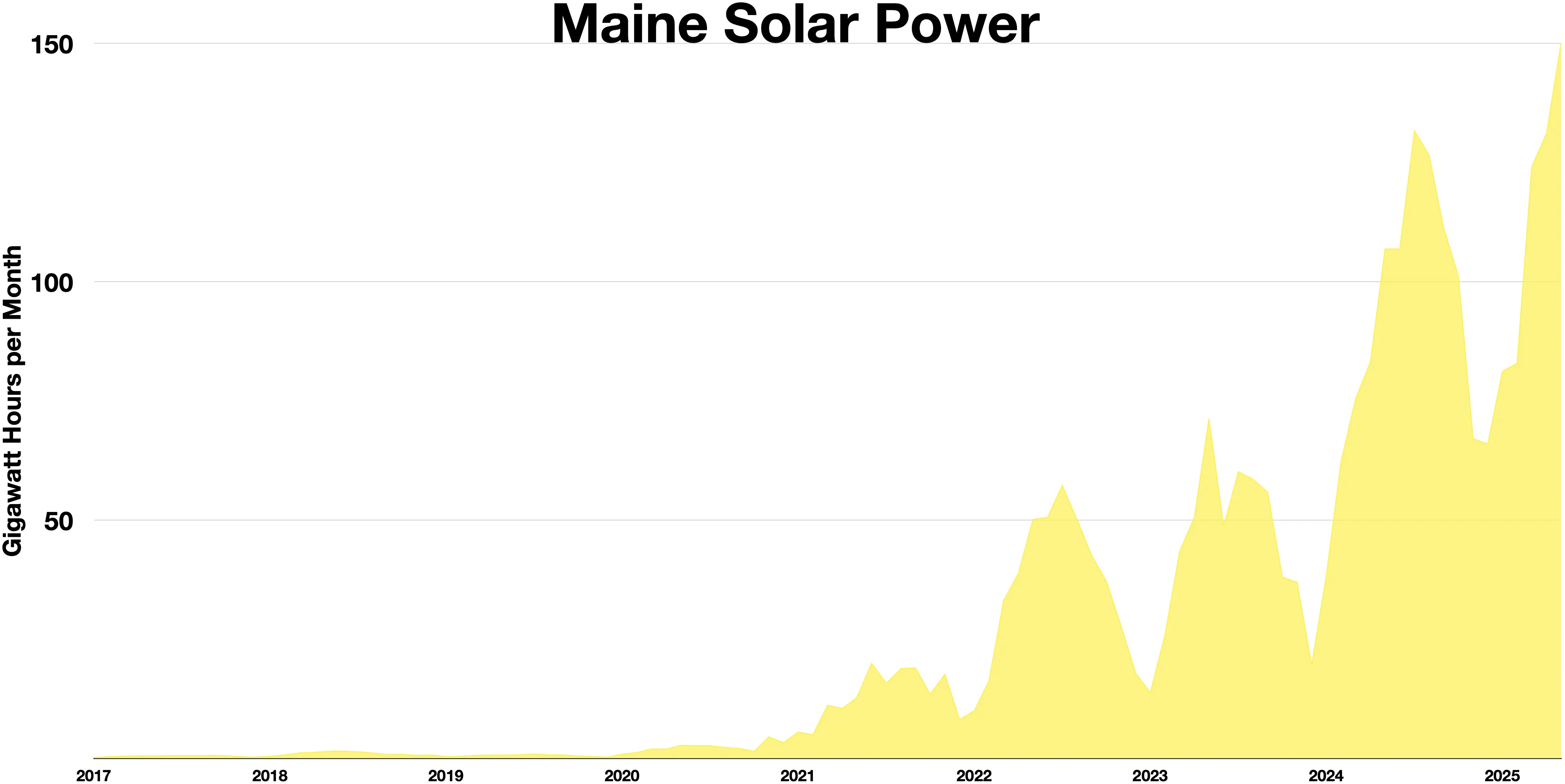
Maine solar power from 2017 to 2025

Grid-connected PV capacity (MW)
Year	Capacity	Installed	% change
2007	0.2		
2008	0.3	0.1	50%
2009	0.3		0%
2010	0.5	0.2	67%
2011	1.1	0.6	120%
2012	2.8	1.7	154%
2013	5.3	2.5	89%
2014	12.7	7.4	140%
2015	19.4	6.7	53%
2016	24.1	4.7	24%
2017	42.5	18.4	76%
2018	67.7	25.2	59%
2019	85.2	17.5	26%
2020	170.7	85.5	100%
2021	440.5	269.8	135%
2022	622	181.5	%

=== Utility-scale generation ===
Utility-scale solar generation in Maine (GWh)
Year	Total	Jan	Feb	Mar	Apr	May	Jun	Jul	Aug	Sep	Oct	Nov	Dec
2017	5	0	0	0	0	0	1	1	1	1	1	0	0
2018	11	0	1	1	1	1	1	1	1	1	1	1	1
2019	7	0	0	1	1	1	1	1	1	1	0	0	0
2020	28	0	0	2	3	3	0	3	3	3	2	5	4
2021	115	6	6	11	11	13	24	21	23				

== Net-metering policy revisions ==
In early 2017, the Maine Public Utilities Commission (PUC) made a decision to phase out solar credits over 15 years. Current customers and new customers up until January 1, 2018 would be grandfathered and receive the current incentives and terms as of 2017. The policy applied to residential solar customers only, not large-scale or community projects. The decision was the result of the commission effort to find a middle ground between solar supporters and opponents of net metering.

Maine Gov. Paul LePage "lambasted the utility regulators" in a "rare press conference." He said he wanted all three commissioners replaced immediately because of their decision. (He appointed all three of them to their seats.) He also said that he wanted to expand the commission from three seats to five seats.

The net-metering policy in force prior to 2017 was restored in April 2019 under Maine Gov. Janet Mills.

== Notable and large installations ==
In October 2007, Maine's largest solar array was the 15.12 kW solar array installed at Maple Hill Farm in Hallowell for $166,000, which through June 11, 2012 has generated 73,416 kWh. Since then average solar costs have dropped substantially, and continue to decline.

In 2011 Maine's largest solar array, 41 kW, was installed on the roof of a new, LEED Platinum grocery store in Augusta. A 500 kW system is proposed for otherwise unusable land at the former Loring Air Force Base.

A 9.9 MW solar farm was proposed for Monroe, to be built in 2016.

In November 2021, a 76.5 MW solar array opened in Farmington as the largest in New England.

== See also ==
- Wind power in Maine
- Solar power in the United States
- Renewable energy in the United States
