= Fauna of Maine =

Native animals of Maine

The fauna of Maine includes many diverse terrestrial and aquatic animal species, especially those common in the North Atlantic Ocean or deciduous and boreal forests of North America. Some of these creatures' habitats have been reduced or fully destroyed by habitat loss and pollution, and many of the animals extirpated from their native ranges.

== Mammals ==
=== Even-toed ungulates ===
==== Deer ====
The deer of Maine include the moose, white-tailed deer, and extirpated caribou.

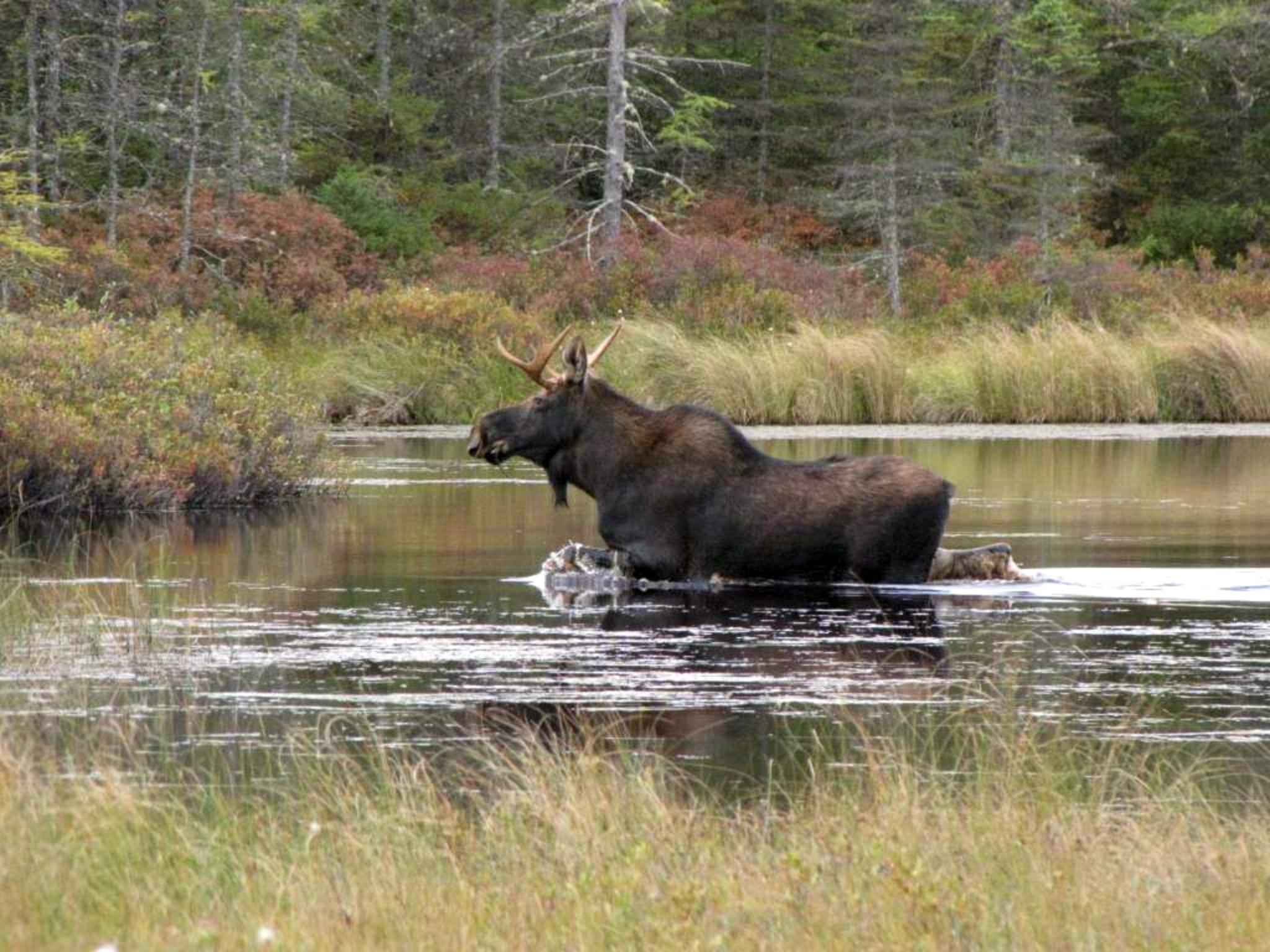
Moose

=== Whales ===
==== Large baleen whales ====
The large baleen whales of Maine include the blue whale, Bryde's whale, finback whale, humpback whale, minke whale, north atlantic right whale, and the sei whale.

==== Large toothed whales ====
The large toothed whales of Maine include the beluga, beaked whale, false killer whale, grampus, killer whale, northern bottlenose whale, pygmy sperm whale, short-finned pilot whale, sperm whale, and the long-finned pilot whale.

=== Rodents ===
==== Erethizontidae ====
The new world porcupines of Maine are strictly limited to the North American porcupine.

==== Beavers ====
The beavers of Maine are strictly limited to the North American beaver.

==== Squirrels ====
The squirrels of Maine include the northern flying squirrel, southern flying squirrel, eastern gray squirrel, American red squirrel, eastern chipmunk, and woodchuck.

==== Cricetids ====
The cricetids of Maine include the common muskrat, northern bog lemming, southern bog lemming, meadow vole, southern red-backed vole, rock vole, woodland vole, North American deermouse, and white-footed mouse.

==== Zapodidae ====
The jumping mice of Maine are limited to the meadow jumping mouse and woodland jumping mouse.

=== Lagomorphs ===
==== Leporids ====
The leporids of Maine include the New England cottontail, eastern cottontail, and snowshoe hare.

=== Carnivores ===
==== Canids ====
The canids of Maine include the red fox, gray fox, eastern coyote, and the extirpated gray wolf.

==== Ursids ====
The ursids of Maine are strictly limited to the American black bear.

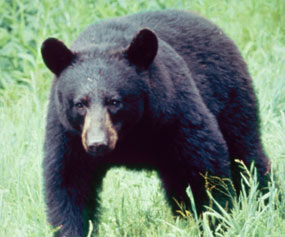
American Black bear

==== Mustelids ====
The mustelids of Maine include the northern river otter, American mink, long-tailed weasel, ermine or short-tailed weasel, fisher (in New England it is more commonly known as a fisher cat), and the American marten (known as a pine marten in some areas of New England, even though the true European pine marten is a separate species).

==== Skunks ====
The mephitids of Maine are strictly limited to the striped skunk.

==== Procyonids ====
The procyonids of Maine are strictly limited to the northern raccoon.

==== Felids ====
The felids of Maine include the bobcat, Canadian lynx, and extirpated eastern cougar.

=== Bats ===
==== Vespertilionines ====
The vespertilionines of Maine include the eastern pipistrelle, big brown bat, little brown bat, eastern small-footed myotis, northern myotis, eastern red bat, hoary bat, and the silver-haired bat.

=== Other small mammals ===
Other small mammals of Maine include species of several different families. These include the following: hairy-tailed mole, star-nosed mole, water shrew, smoky shrew, long-tailed shrew, pygmy shrew, cinereus shrew, northern short-tailed shrew, and the Virginia opossum.

== Birds ==
Maine is a diverse state with a large coastline and thousands of lakes, streams and rivers, resulting in a diverse array of waterfowl, seabirds and shore birds. A few examples include the mallard, wood duck, American black duck, Canada goose, common loon, pied-billed grebe, horned grebe, red-necked grebe, northern fulmar, greater shearwater, sooty shearwater, Manx shearwater, Wilson's storm-petrel, Leach's storm-petrel, piping plover, American pipit, Arctic tern, Atlantic puffin, black tern, and the razorbill.

Maine is also home to a wide variety of birds of prey, such as the northern goshawk, bald eagle, sharp-shinned hawk, Cooper's hawk, northern harrier, and red-tailed hawk. great horned owl, barn owl, barred owl, long-eared owl, great gray owl and northern saw-whet owl. Historically, Maine was also home to a nesting population of golden eagles, though today it is only part of their winter range.

Other common species include the common nighthawk, whip-poor-will, chimney swift, black-capped chickadee, indigo bunting, scarlet tanager, American goldfinch, tufted titmouse and the mourning dove.

== Reptiles ==
=== Snakes ===
The snakes of Maine include the common garter snake, common watersnake, eastern racer, DeKay's brown snake, milk snake, redbelly snake, ribbon snake, ring-necked snake, and the smooth green snake. The timber rattlesnake previously lived in Maine, but is now extirpated.

=== Turtles ===
==== Land Turtles ====
The land turtles of Maine include Blanding's turtle, the box turtle, common musk turtle, common snapping turtle, painted turtle, spotted turtle, and the wood turtle.

==== Marine Turtles ====
The marine turtles of Maine include Kemp's ridley sea turtle, the leatherback sea turtle, and the loggerhead sea turtle.

== Fish ==
Maine's state fish is the Landlocked Atlantic Salmon.

Maine is considered the last stronghold for large lake dwelling and sea-run brook trout according to the Native Fish Coalition, these brook trout provide an important sports fishery throughout the state.

Other native sports fish species include Lake Trout, Arctic Char, Burbot, Rainbow Smelt, Lake Whitefish, White Perch and Striped Bass.

== Molluscs ==
There are 92 species of terrestrial gastropods in Maine.
