= List of power stations in Maine =

Sources of Maine utility-scale electricity generation in gigawatt-hours, full-year 2025:
1. Natural gas: 5,565 (37.5%)
2. Wind: 2,874 (19.4%)
3. Hydroelectric: 2,639 (17.8%)
4. Biomass: 1,740 (11.7%)
5. Solar: 1,547 (10.4%)
6. Petroleum: 167 (1.13%)
7. Coal: 32 (0.22%)
8. Other: 268 (1.81%)

This is a list of electricity-generating power stations in the U.S. state of Maine, sorted by type and name. In 2024, Maine had a total summer capacity of 5.6 GW through all of its power plants, and a net generation of 14,655 GWh. In 2025, the state's electrical energy generation mix was 37.5% natural gas, 19.4% wind, 17.8% hydroelectric, 11.7% biomass, 10.4% solar, 1.1% petroleum, 0.2% coal, and 1.8% other. Small-scale solar, which includes customer-owned photovoltaic panels, delivered an additional net 1,344 GWh of energy to the state's electrical grid in 2025. This was about 15% less than the 1,547 GWh generated by Maine's utility-scale photovoltaic plants.

During 2021, renewable sources generated 74% of all electrical energy from Maine, making it one of the top-five U.S. states. Maine's share of wind generation is the largest among New England states, and its share of biomass generation from the wood industry and municipal waste sources is the largest in the United States. Maine's electricity generation has not met the in-state demand in recent years, and about one-quarter of its electricity consumption was imported from Canada.

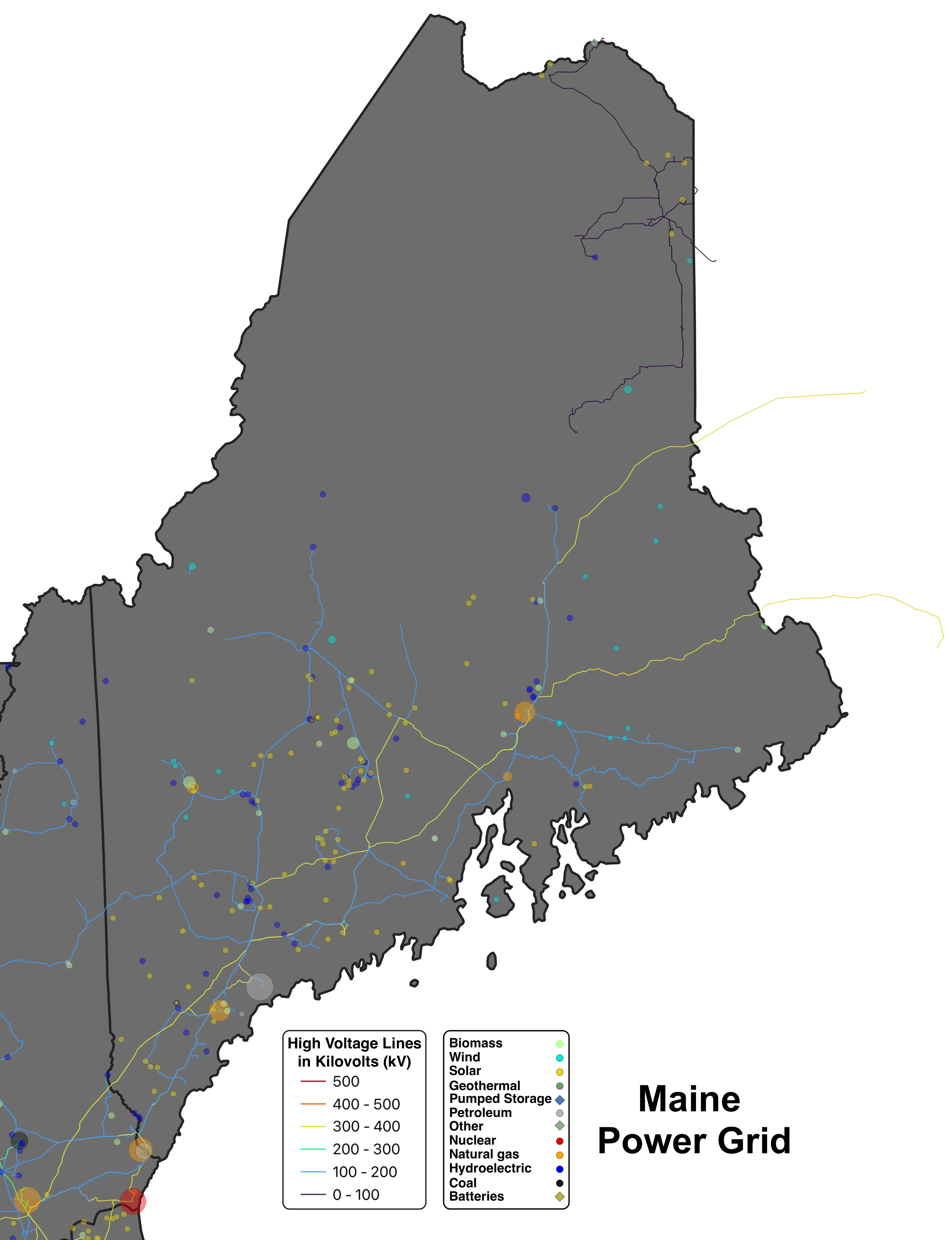
Maine power grid

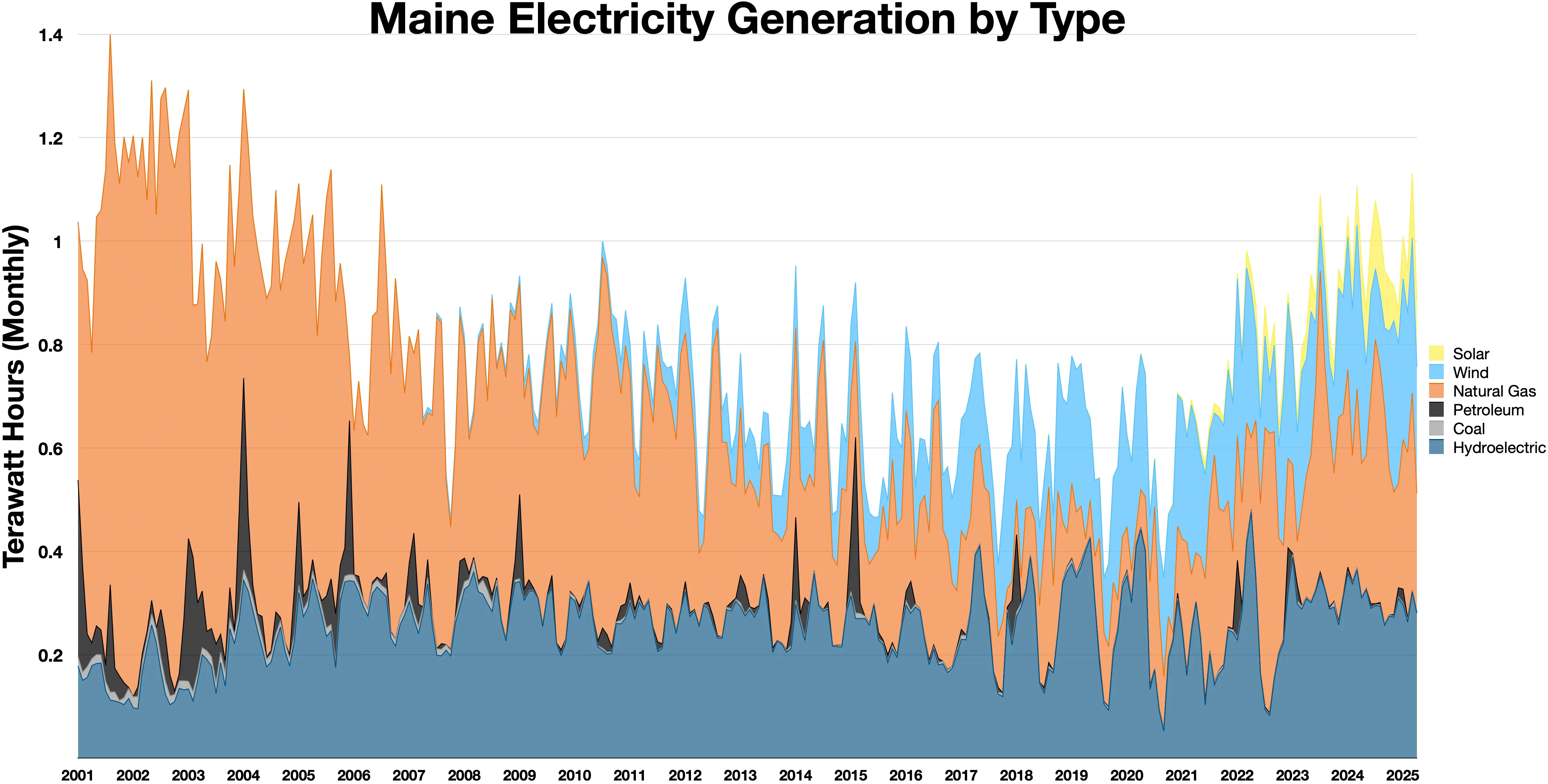
Maine electricity generation by type

== Nuclear power stations ==
The Maine Yankee Nuclear Power Plant generated 860 MW of base load electricity during the years 1972 to 1996. Decommissioning was completed in 2005. Maine had no utility-scale plants that used fissile material as a fuel in 2019.

== Fossil-fuel power stations ==
Data from the U.S. Energy Information Administration serves as a general reference.

=== Coal-fired ===
The Mason Station in Wiscasset was a coal-fired plant built in 1941-42, with the capability of producing 153,500 kilowatts giving it the status, at that time, of Maine’s second largest electric generating plant, W.D. Wyman Station in Yarmouth was the largest with a capacity of 225,000 kilowatts.

Central Maine Power and Wiscasset were good neighbors for many years. The Mason Station was many things to the community. It brought economic growth to the town and livelihood to its employees. It produced electricity at a time when it was needed most, and, being the largest taxpayer in town, it helped keep the mil rate low for other taxpayers.

For several years in the 1970s, Maine Salmon Farms raised Pacific Coho salmon in the warm water outflow from Mason steam station in Wiscasset. The warm water prevented icing and allowed the young fish to grow even in the cold winter months.

The Rumford Cogeneration and S D Warren Plants previously burned coal as primary fuel, and continued to burn it as secondary fuel in 2019 (see Biomass). Maine had no operating utility-scale plants that used coal as a primary fuel in 2019.

=== Natural gas-fired ===
Name	Location	Coordinates	Capacity (MW)	Generation type	Year opened	Refs
Androscoggin Energy Center	Franklin County	44.5063°N 70.2423°W	163.5	Simple cycle (x3)	1999/2000	
Bucksport Generation Plant	Hancock County	44.5738°N 68.8046°W	186.8	Simple cycle	2001	
Maine Independence Station	Penobscot County	44.8242°N 68.7094°W	550.2	2x1 Combined cycle	2000	
Mead Rumford Cogen	Oxford County	44.5465°N 70.5443°W	12.5	Steam turbine	1954	
Rumford Power Plant	Oxford County	44.5303°N 70.5219°W	262.9	1x1 combined cycle	2000	
Westbrook Energy Center	Cumberland County	43.6575°N 70.3750°W	563.9	2x1 combined cycle	2001	

=== Petroleum-fired ===
Maine's petroleum-fired plants were operated as peaker plants in 2019.

Name	Location	Coordinates	Capacity (MW)	Generation type	Year opened	Ref
Cape Gas Turbine	Cumberland County	43.6436°N 70.2544°W	35.0	Simple cycle (x2)	1970	
Flos Inn Diesel	Aroostook County	43.6436°N 70.2544°W	6.0	Reciprocating engine (x3)	1959	
Wyman Power Station	Cumberland County	43.7508°N 70.1567°W	846^{[A]}	Steam turbine (x4)	1957-1978	

^{A} 16.2MW battery storage capacity added at Wyman Station in 2016.

== Renewable power stations ==
Data from the U.S. Energy Information Administration serves as a general reference.

=== Biomass and municipal waste ===
Name	Location	Coordinates	Capacity (MW)	Fuel	Generation type	Year opened	Refs
Androscoggin Mill	Franklin County	44.5063°N 70.2395°W	80	Wood/wood waste	Steam turbine (x3)	1964-1974	
Athens Energy Plant	Somerset County	44.9455°N 69.6607°W	8.5	Wood/wood waste	Steam turbine	2016	
Crossroads Landfill Gas	Somerset County	44.7014°N 69.8319°W	3.2	Landfill gas	Reciprocating engine (x2)	2009	
Jonesboro Energy Center (Indeck)	Washington County	44.6781°N 67.5477°W	27.5	Wood/wood waste	Steam turbine	1987	
Livermore Falls Plant	Penobscot County	44.4317°N 70.1619°W	39.6	Wood/wood waste	Steam turbine	1992	
MMWAC Resource Recovery Facility	Androscoggin County	44.0678°N 70.2608°W	5.0	Municipal solid waste (biogenic & non-biogenic), natural gas	Steam turbine	1992	
Old Town Waste Plant	Penobscot County	44.9181°N 68.6355°W	28.5	Wood/wood waste	Steam turbine (x2)	1965/1987	
Penobscot Energy Recovery Facility	Penobscot County	44.7383°N 68.8258°W	25.3	Municipal solid waste (biogenic & non-biogenic), fuel oil	Steam turbine	1987	
Pine Tree Landfill Gas	Penobscot County	44.7686°N 68.8617°W	3.3	Landfill gas	Reciprocating engine (x3)	2008	
Regional Waste Systems Facility	Cumberland County	43.6556°N 70.3347°W	13.3	Municipal solid waste (biogenic & non-biogenic), natural gas	Steam turbine	1988	
Rumford Cogeneration Plant	Oxford County	44.5513°N 70.5414°W	102.6	Wood waste, coal, tire-derived fuel	Steam turbine	1990	
S. D. Warren Westbrook Plant	Cumberland County	43.6849°N 70.3532°W	62.5	Wood waste, coal	Steam turbine (x2)	1982/1985	
Somerset Waste Plant	Somerset County	44.7035°N 69.6474°W	107.1	Wood waste, natural gas, tire-derived fuel	Steam turbine (x2)	1976/1990	
Stratton Plant	Franklin County	45.1406°N 70.4256°W	45.7	Wood/wood waste	Steam turbine	1989	
Twin Rivers Paper Plant	Aroostook County	47.3581°N 68.3309°W	22.0	Wood/industrial waste	Steam turbine	1987	
West Enfield Energy Center (Indeck)	Penobscot County	45.2537°N 68.6279°W	27.5	Wood/wood waste	Steam turbine	1987	
Woodland Pulp Waste Plant	Washington County	45.1554°N 67.4012°W	49.8	Wood/wood waste	Steam turbine (x2)	1966/1970^{[A]}	

^{A} In operation since 1906, original units retired.

=== Hydroelectric ===
Name	Location	Coordinates	Capacity (MW)	Number of turbines	Year opened	Refs
Anson-Abenaki Hydros Plant	Somerset County	44.7975°N 69.8867°W	29.0	13	1950-1994	
Aziscohos Hydro Project	Oxford County	44.9439°N 70.9975°W	6.7	1	1988	
Bonny Eagle Hydropower Plant	York County	43.6877°N 70.6116°W	7.2	6	1910	
Brunswick Hydro Plant	Cumberland County	43.9205°N 69.9678°W	19.6	3	1982/1983	
Caribou Generation Station	Aroostook County	46.8480°N 68.0026°W	0.8	2	1926	
Charles E. Monty Hydro Plant	Androscoggin County	44.0995°N 70.2209°W	28.4	2	1990	
Deer Rips	Androscoggin County	44.1346°N 70.2037°W	6.5	7	1903-1924	
Ellsworth Hydro Station	Hancock County	44.5442°N 68.4306°W	8.9	4	1924-1938	
Great Lakes Hydro America (West Branch Penobscot Hydro)	Penobscot County	45.6472°N 68.7044°W	135.7	31	1917-1988	
Gulf Island Hydro Plant	Androscoggin County	44.1529°N 70.2094°W	19.2	3	1926	
Harris Hydro Plant	Somerset County	45.4592°N 69.8658°W	76.4	4	1954-1955	
Hiram Hydropower Plant	Cumberland County	43.8525°N 70.7969°W	10.5	2	1917/1985	
Hydro Kennebec Project	Kennebec County	44.5630°N 69.6192°W	15.0	2	1989	
International Paper Hydro; Livermore/ Riley/ Jay	Androscoggin County; Franklin County	44.4705°N 70.1873°W; 44.5034°N 70.2491°W; 44.5037°N 70.2210°W	18.9	21	1910-1981	
Lockwood Hydro Facility	Kennebec County	44.5467°N 69.6292°W	7.2	7	1985/1988	
Milford Hydro Station	Penobscot County	44.9421°N 68.6450°W	7.8	6	1941-1956^{[A]}/ 2011	
Otis Hydropower Plant	Franklin County	44.4778°N 70.2008°W	10.2	2	1985	
Pejepscot Hydroelectric Project	Sagadahoc County	43.9574°N 70.0242°W	13.5	4	1987	
Rumford Falls Hydro Facility	Oxford County	44.5390°N 70.5450°W	39.2	6	1918-1954	
S D Warren Hydropower Plant	Cumberland County	43.6849°N 70.3532°W	7.2	14	1903/1913/ 1940	
Shawmut Hydropower Plant	Somerset County	44.6295°N 69.5835°W	9.2	8	1913/192/ 1982	
Skelton Hydropower Plant	York County	43.5708°N 70.5583°W	16.8	2	1948	
West Enfield Hydro Plant	Penobscot County	45.2497°N 68.6483°W	13.0	2	1988	
Weston Hydro Plant	Somerset County	44.7639°N 69.7183°W	12.0	4	1921/1923	
Williams Hydro Plant	Somerset County	44.9589°N 69.8703°W	13.0	2	1939/1950	
Woodland Pulp Hydro Plant	Washington County	45.1554°N 67.4012°W	18.5	10	1906/1912/ 1929/1970^{[B]}	
Worumbo Hydro Station	Androscoggin County	43.9947°N 70.0619°W	19.4	2	1989	
Wyman Hydro Plant	Somerset County	45.0703°N 69.9064°W	72.0	3	1930/1931/ 1940	

^{A} In operation since 1906, original units retired.
^{B} Retirement pending
See also: Natural Resources Council of Maine Hydro Facilities

=== Wind ===
Name	Location	Coordinates	Capacity (MW)	Number of turbines	Year opened	Turbine Mfg spec	Refs
Beaver Ridge Wind Project	Waldo County	44.4967°N 69.3500°W	4.5	3	2008	GE 1.5MW	
Bingham Wind Project	Piscataquis County	45.1033°N 69.7619°W	186	56	2016	Vestas 3.3MW	
Bull Hill Wind Project	Hancock County	44.7230°N 68.2425°W	34.2	19	2012	Vestas 1.8MW	
Canton Mountain Wind Project	Oxford County	44.5147°N 70.3031°W	22.8	8	2017	GE 2.85MW	
Fox Islands Wind Project	Knox County	44.0942°N 68.8658°W	4.5	3	2009	GE 1.5MW	
Hancock Wind Project	Hancock County	44.7608°N 68.1469°W	51	17	2016	Vestas 3.3MW	
Kibby Wind Facility (I&II)	Franklin County	45.3853°N 70.5258°W	132	44	2009/2010	Vestas 3.0MW	
Mars Hill Wind Farm	Aroostook County	46.5442°N 67.8111°W	42	28	2006	GE 1.5MW	
Oakfield Wind Project	Aroostook County	46.0581°N 68.1472°W	148	48	2015	Vestas 3.0MW	
Passadumkeag Wind Park	Penobscot County	45.0700°N 68.2100°W	42.9	13	2016	Vestas 3.3MW	
Pisgah Mountain Wind	Penobscot County	44.7773°N 68.5234°W	9.1	5	2016	Vestas 1.8MW	
Record Hill Wind Farm	Oxford County	44.6336°N 70.6277°W	50.6	22	2011	Siemens 2.3MW	
Rollins Wind Project	Penobscot County	45.3460°N 68.3802°W	60	40	2011	GE 1.5MW	
Saddleback Ridge Wind Project (I&II)	Franklin County	44.5933°N 70.3811°W	34.2	12	2014/2015	GE 2.85MW	
Spruce Mountain Wind Project	Oxford County	44.4156°N 70.5598°W	20	10	2011	Gamesa 2.0MW	
Stetson Wind Farm I & II	Washington County	45.4822°N 67.9944°W	82.5	55	2009/2010	GE 1.5MW	

=== Solar ===
Name	Location	Coordinates	Capacity (MW_{AC})	Year opened	Refs
Bowdoin College Solar	Cumberland County	43°53′46″N 69°57′00″W	1.2^{[A]}	2014	
Farmington Solar	Franklin County		76.5	2021	
IGS Madison Electric Works	Somerset County	44.8040°N 69.8380°W	4.1	2017	
NRG Solar Mule (Colby College Solar Array)	Kennebec County	44.5577°N 69.6714°W	1.5	2017	
Sanford Airport Solar Project	York County	43°23′16″N 70°42′15″W	50.0	2020/2021	

^{A} 0.6MW ground array + 0.6MW rooftop solar

== Storage power stations ==
Data from the U.S. Energy Information Administration serves as a general reference.

=== Battery storage ===
As of February 2026, Maine has 7 grid-connected battery storage sites.

Name	Location	Coordinates	Discharge capacity (MW)	Year opened	Refs
Cross Town Energy Storage	Cumberland County		175.0	2025	
William F. Wyman Hybrid	Cumberland County	43.7508°N 70.1567°W	16.2	2016	

== See also ==
- List of power stations in the United States
