= List of Maine state symbols =

Map of the United States, highlighting Maine

This is a list of Maine state symbols in the United States. The symbols were recognized and signed into law by the Maine Legislature and governor of Maine and are officially listed in the Maine Laws in article 1, chapter 9.

The oldest symbols, the state flag and the state seal, were adopted in 1820, and the most recent additions to the list were, the state song of the 21st century, My Sweet Maine in 2021 and the state butterfly, the pink-edged sulphur in 2023.

== State symbols ==
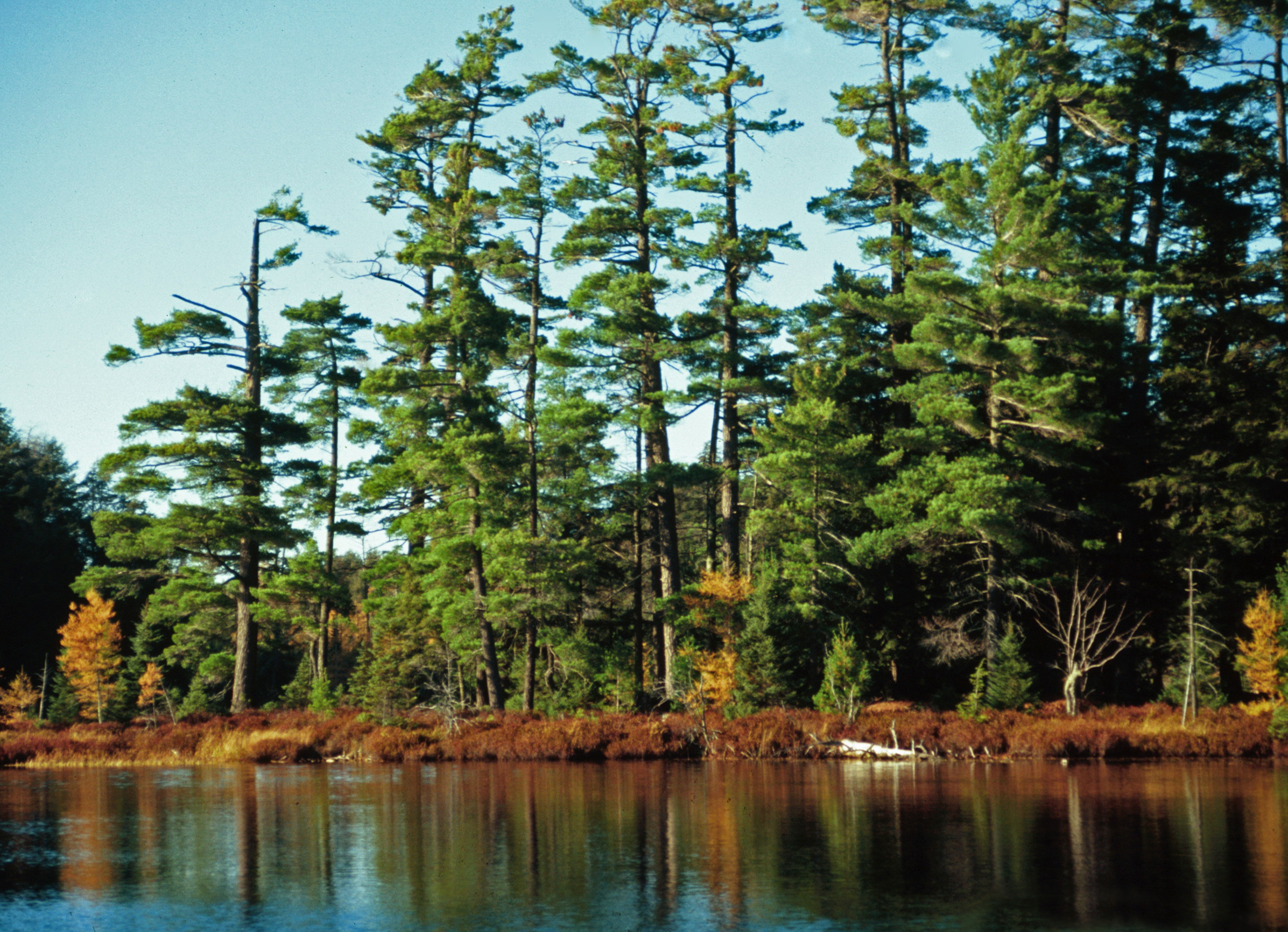
The Maine state tree, Eastern white pine

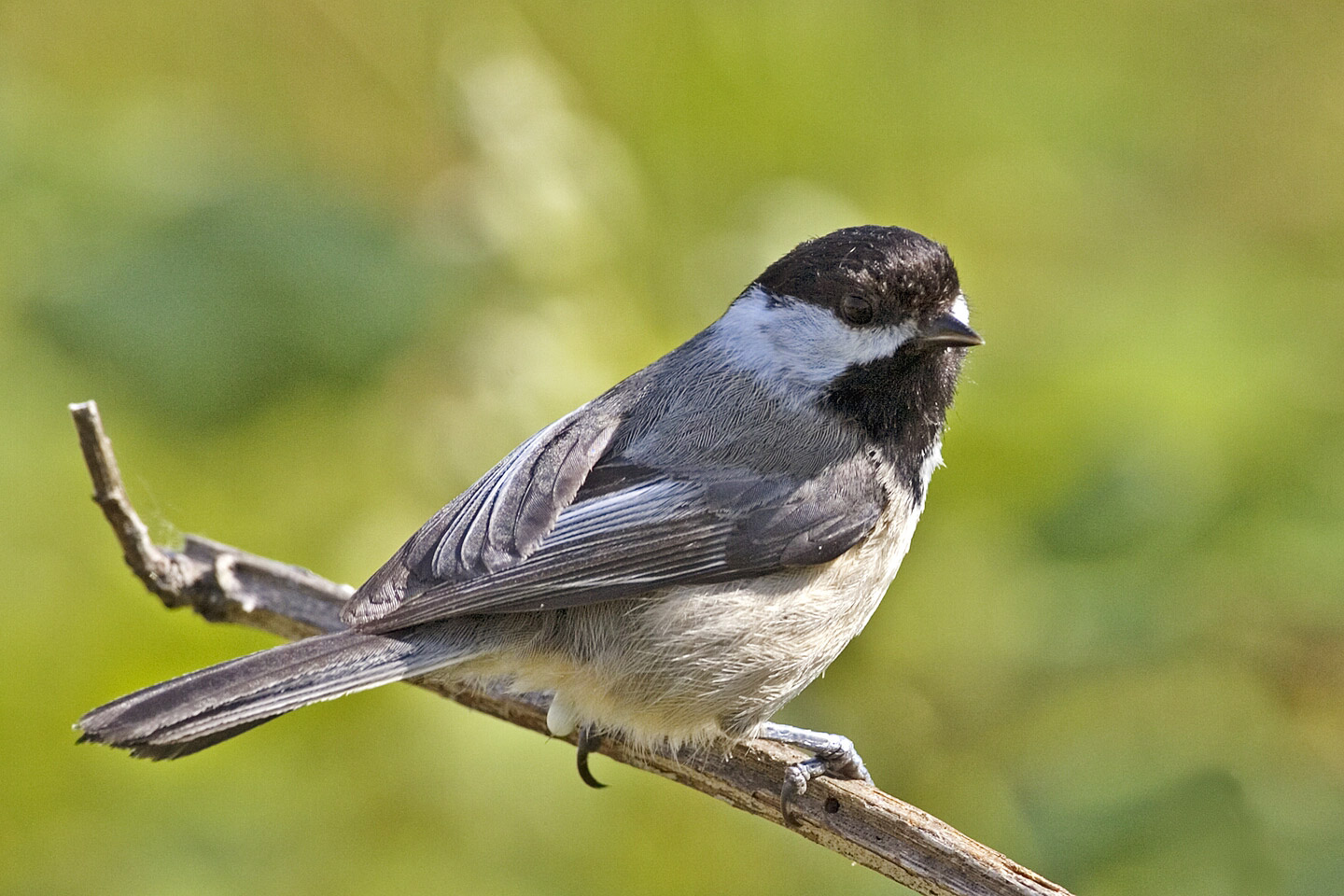
The Maine state bird, the Black-capped chickadee

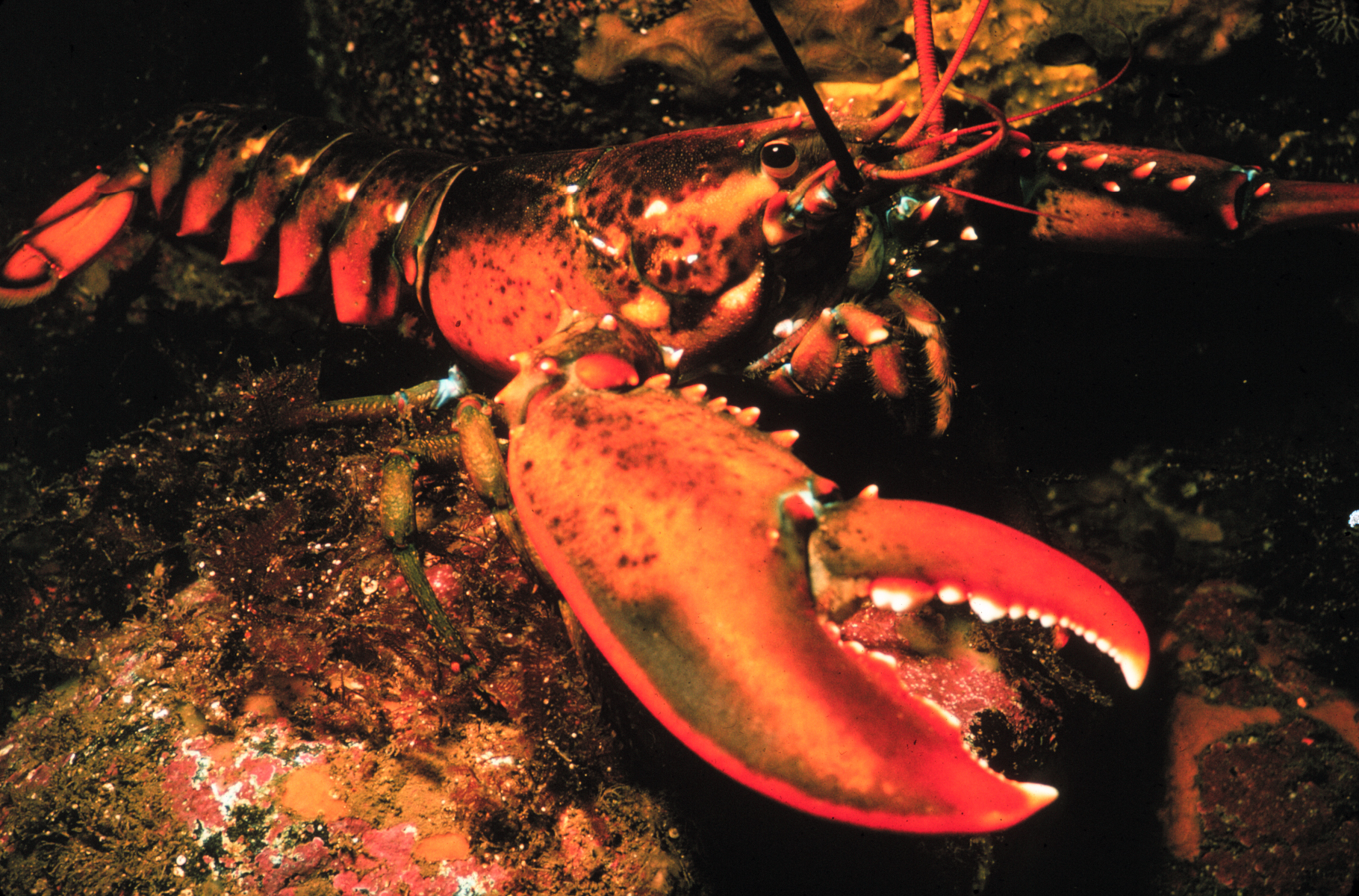
The Maine state crustacean, the American lobster

State symbols table
Symbol	Name	Taxonomy	Adopted	Ref
State animal	Moose	Alces alces	1979	
State ballad	The Ballad of the 20th Maine^{note}		2019	
State berry	Blueberry	Vaccinium angustifolium	1991	
State beverage	Moxie		2005	
State bird	Black-capped chickadee	Poecile atricapillus	1927	
State butterfly	Pink-edged sulphur	Colias interior	2023	
State cat	Maine Coon		1985	
State crustacean	American Lobster	Homarus americanus	2016	
State dessert	Blueberry pie		2011	
State fish	Landlocked Atlantic salmon	Salmo salar	1969	
State flag	Flag of Maine		1901	
State flower	White Pine Cone and Tassel	Pinus strobus (Linnaeus)	1895	
State fossil	''Pertica quadrifaria''	''Pertica quadrifaria''	1985	
State gemstone	Tourmaline	Ditrigonal pyramidal	1971	
State Herb	Wintergreen	Gaultheria procumbens	1999	
State insect	Honey bee	Apis mellifera	1975	
State march	The Dirigo March^{note}		2012	
State motto	Dirigo (I lead)		1820	
State Nickname	The Pine Tree State		1860	
State seal	Seal of Maine		1820	
State soil	Chesuncook		1999	
State song	The Maine song^{note}		1937	
State song of 21st century	My Sweet Maine^{note}		2021	
State treat	Whoopie pie		2011	
State sweetener	Maine Maple syrup		2015	
State tree	Eastern White Pine	Pinus strobus	1945	
State sailing vessel	Bowdoin		1986	

== See also ==
- Lists of United States state symbols

== Notes ==
a. Written by Griffin Sherry of The Ghost of Paul Revere
b. Written by Roger Vinton Snow
c. Written by Terry Swett
d. Written by Leo J. Pepin
