= List of television stations in Maine =

This is a list of broadcast television stations that are licensed in the U.S. state of Maine.

== Full-power ==
- Stations are arranged by media market served and channel position.

Full-power television stations in Maine
Media market	Station	Channel	Primary affiliation(s)	Notes	Refs
Bangor	WLBZ	2	NBC		
Bangor	WABI-TV	5	CBS, The CW on 5.2		
Bangor	WVII-TV	7	ABC, Fox/MyNetworkTV on 7.2		
Bangor	WMEB-TV	12	PBS	(Note: Licensed to Orono, Maine.) (Note: Semi-satellite of WCBB.)	
Portland	WCSH	6	NBC		
Portland	WMTW	8	ABC	(Note: Licensed to Poland Spring, Maine.)	
Portland	WCBB	10	PBS	(Note: Licensed to Augusta, Maine.)	
Portland	WGME-TV	13	CBS		
Portland	WPFO	23	Fox	(Note: Licensed to Waterville, Maine.)	
Portland	WMEA-TV	26	PBS	(Note: Licensed to Biddeford, Maine.)	
Portland	WIPL	35	Ion Television	(Note: Licensed to Lewiston, Maine.)	
Portland	WPXT	51	The CW, Heroes & Icons/MyNetworkTV on 51.2		
Presque Isle	WAGM-TV	8	CBS, Fox on 8.2, The CW on 8.3		
Presque Isle	WMEM-TV	10	PBS		
~Saint John, NB	WMED-TV	13	PBS	(Note: Licensed to Calais, Maine.)	

== Low-power ==
Low-power television stations in Maine
Media market	Station	Channel	Network	Notes	Refs
Bangor	W15DS-D	15	[Blank]		
Bangor	WBGR-LD	18	MeTV		
Bangor	W20ER-D	20	Various		
Bangor	WFVX-LD	22	Fox/MyNetworkTV, ABC on 22.2		
Bangor	W32FS-D	32	Various		
Bangor	W34EQ-D	34	[Blank]		
Portland	W14DA-D	14	Community programming	(Note: Licensed to Harpswell, Maine.)	
Portland	WFYW-LP	41	3ABN	(Note: Licensed to Fairfield, Maine.)	
Presque Isle	WWPI-LD	16	NBC		

== Translators ==
Television station translators in Maine
Media market	Station	Channel	Translating	Notes	Refs
Bangor	WGCI-LD	2	WLBZ	(Note: Licensed to Skowhegan, Maine.)	
Bangor	W19FA-D	5	WABI-TV		
Bangor	W21EO-D	5	WABI-TV		
Bangor	W36FM-D	36	WABI-TV	(Note: Licensed to Etna, Maine.)	
Portland	W04BS-D	10	WCBB	(Note: Licensed to Bethel, Maine.)	
Portland	W03AM-D	10	WCBB	(Note: Licensed to Harrison, Maine.)	
Portland	WMTW (DRT)	8	WMTW		
Presque Isle	W02AU-D	8	WAGM-TV	(Note: Licensed to St. Francis, Maine.)	
Presque Isle	W05DD-D	10	WMEM-TV		

== Defunct ==
- WLAM-TV Lewiston (1953–1955)
- WPMT Portland (1953–1954)
