= List of Maine suffragists =

This is a list of Maine suffragists, suffrage groups and others associated with the cause of women's suffrage in Maine.

== Groups ==
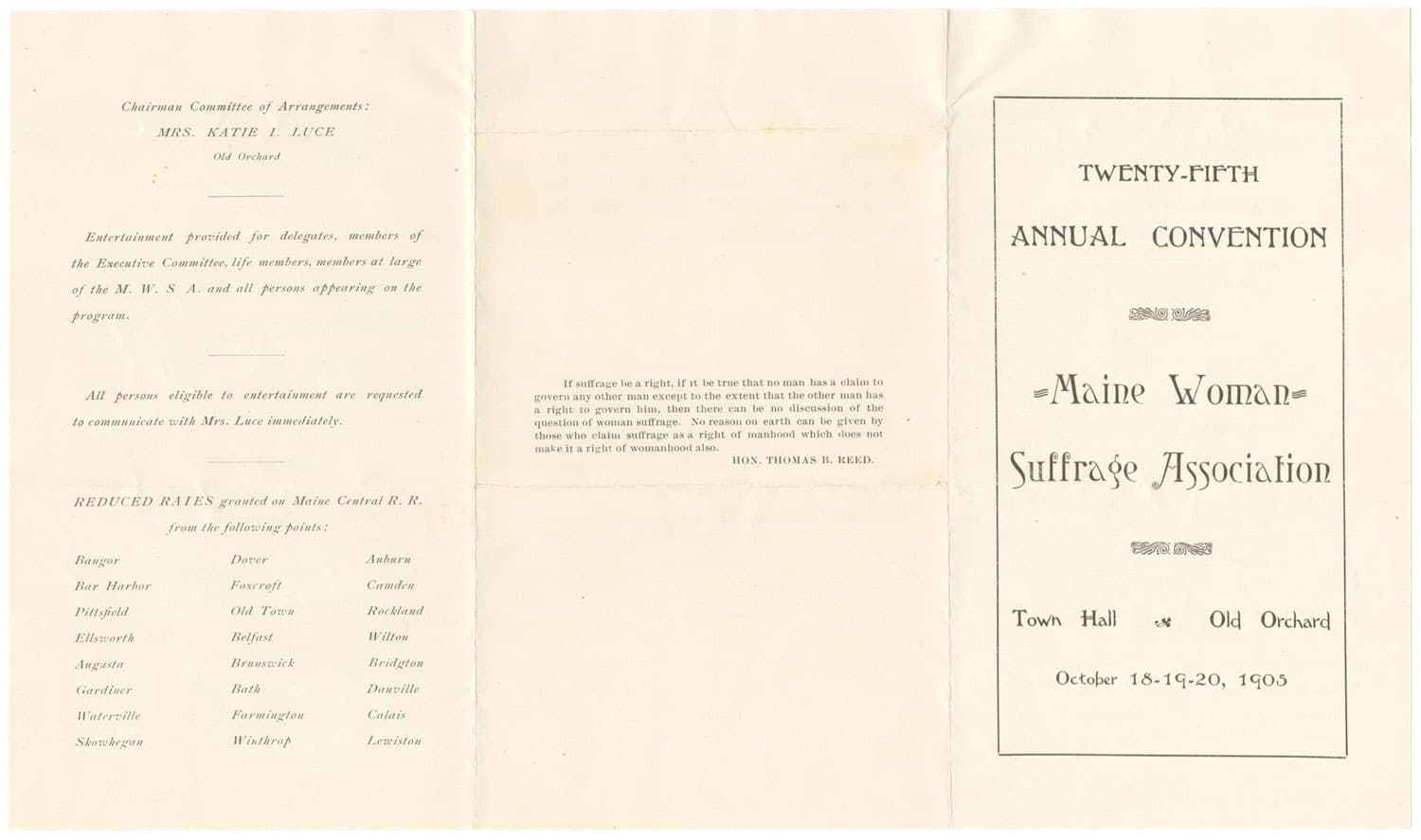
25th Annual Convention for the Maine Woman Suffrage Association, October 1905

- Bangor Suffrage Center
- Belfast Suffrage League, formed in 1916
- College Equal Suffrage League of Maine, formed in 1913
- Congressional Union for Woman Suffrage, and later, National Woman's Party
- Cumberland County Convention of Reformed Men
- Equal Rights Association of Rockland, formed in 1868
- Farmington Equal Suffrage Association, formed in 1906
- Maine Federation of Women's Clubs (MFWC)
- Maine Woman Suffrage Association (MWSA), formed in 1873
- The Men's Equal Suffrage League of Maine, formed in 1914
- Portland Equal Franchise League
- Woman Suffrage Association of Portland
- Women's Christian Temperance Union (WCTU), first Maine chapter formed in 1874

== Suffragists ==
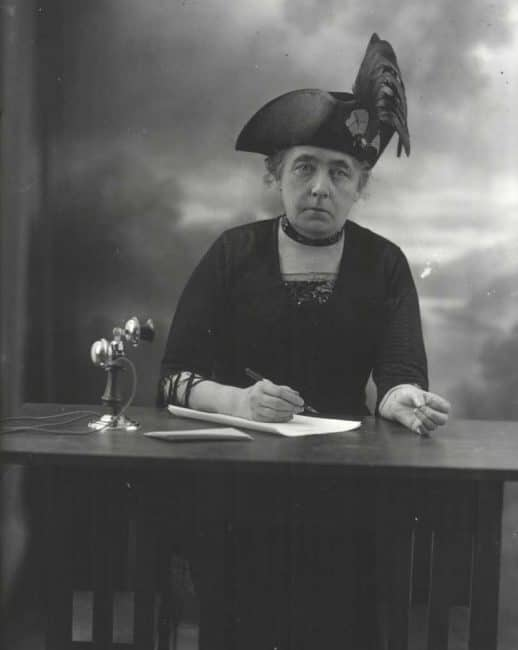
Essie Carle, c. 1920

- Sophia P. Anthoine (Portland)
- Jane Sophia Appleton (Bangor)
- Hannah Johnston Bailey (Winthrop)
- Katherine Reed Balentine (Portland)
- Camille Lessard Bissonnette (Lewiston)
- Henry Blanchard (Portland)
- Ralph O. Brewster
- Margaret W. Campbell (Hancock County)
- Essie P. Carle (Belfast)
- Sarah G. Crosby (Albion)
- Lucy Hobart Day
- Lydia Neal Dennett (Portland)
- Adelaide Emerson (Ellsworth)
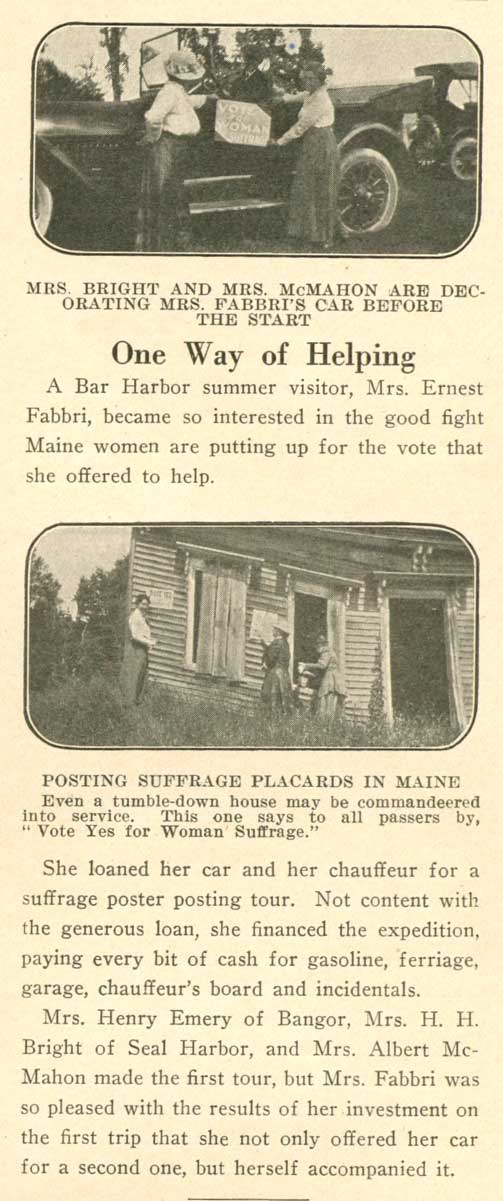
  Woman Citizen
- Fannie J. Fernald (Old Orchard)
- Jennie Fuller (Hartland)
- Abby F. Fulton
- Obadiah Gardner (Augusta)
- Ann F. Jarvis Greely (Ellsworth)
- Isabel Greenwood (Farmington)
- Ira G. Hersey (Houlton)
- Jane Lord Hersom.
- Charlotte Hill (Ellsworth)
- Augusta Merrill Hunt (Portland)
- Benjamin Kingsbury (Portland)
- Deborah Knox Livingston (Bangor)
- Clara Hapgood Nash
- John Neal (Portland)
- Joshua Nye (Augusta)
- Sarah Jane Lincoln O'Brion (Cornish)
- Maud Wood Park (Cape Elizabeth)
- Leonard A. Pierce (Portland)
- Lucy Nicolar Poolaw (Penobscot) (Indian Island)
- Louise Johnson Pratt (Belfast)
- Cordelia A. Quinby (Augusta)
- Olive Rose (Warren)
- Leslie R. Rounds
- Lurana W. Sheldon.
- Lavinia Snow (Rockland)
- Lucy Snow (Rockland)
- Sophronia Snow (Hampden)
- Jane H. Spofford (Hampden)
- Lillian M. N. Stevens (Portland)
- Zenas Thompson (Portland)
- Rebecca Usher (Hollis)
- L. Alfreda Brewster Wallace
- Florence Brooks Whitehouse (Augusta)
- Robert Treat Whitehouse
- William Penn Whitehouse (Augusta)
- Georgietta Julia Nickerson Whitten
- Elizabeth Upham Yates

=== Politicians supporting women's suffrage in Maine ===
- Carl E. Milliken

== Suffragists who campaigned in Maine ==
- Susan B. Anthony
- Abby Scott Baker
- Henry B. Blackwell
- Carrie Chapman Catt
- Elizabeth Glendower Evans
- Beatrice Forbes-Robertson Hale
- Diana Hirschler
- Julia Ward Howe
- Augusta Hughston
- Florence Kelley
- Gail Laughlin
- Dora Lewis
- Mary Livermore
- Ettie Lois Simonds Lowell
- Maud Wood Park
- Nancy M. Schoonmaker
- Anna Howard Shaw
- Lucy Stone
- Mary Winsor

== Anti-suffragists ==
Groups

- Maine Association Opposed to Suffrage for Women, formed in 1913

People

- Harriet Bird (Yarmouth)
- Sophia C. Brackett (Portland)
- Susannah Bundy Brown (Portland)
- Lucy Cobb (Rockland)
- Margaret L. Dalton (Portland)
- C. T. Ogden (Deering)
- Sewall C. Strout (Portland)

== See also ==
- Timeline of women's suffrage in Maine
- Women's suffrage in Maine
- Women's suffrage in states of the United States
- Women's suffrage in the United States

=== Sources ===
- Anthony, Susan B. (1902). Anthony, Susan B.; Harper, Ida Husted (eds.). The History of Woman Suffrage. Vol. 4. Indianapolis: The Hollenbeck Press.
- Gass, Anne (October 2011). "Florence Brooks Whitehouse and Maine's Vote to Ratify Women's Suffrage in 1919". Maine History. 46 (1): 38–66.
- Harper, Ida Husted (1922). The History of Woman Suffrage. New York: J.J. Little & Ives Company.
- Maine State Museum (2019). "Maine Suffrage Who's Who" (PDF). Women's Long Road.
- Risk, Shannon M. (2009). 'In Order to Establish Justice': The Nineteenth-Century Woman Suffrage Movements of Maine and New Brunswick (Thesis). University of Maine. CiteSeerX 10.1.1.428.3747.
- Spiker, LaRue (2012). "Women Got the Vote Fifty Years Ago" (PDF). Chebacco. 13: 21–27.
