= Timeline of women's suffrage in Maine =

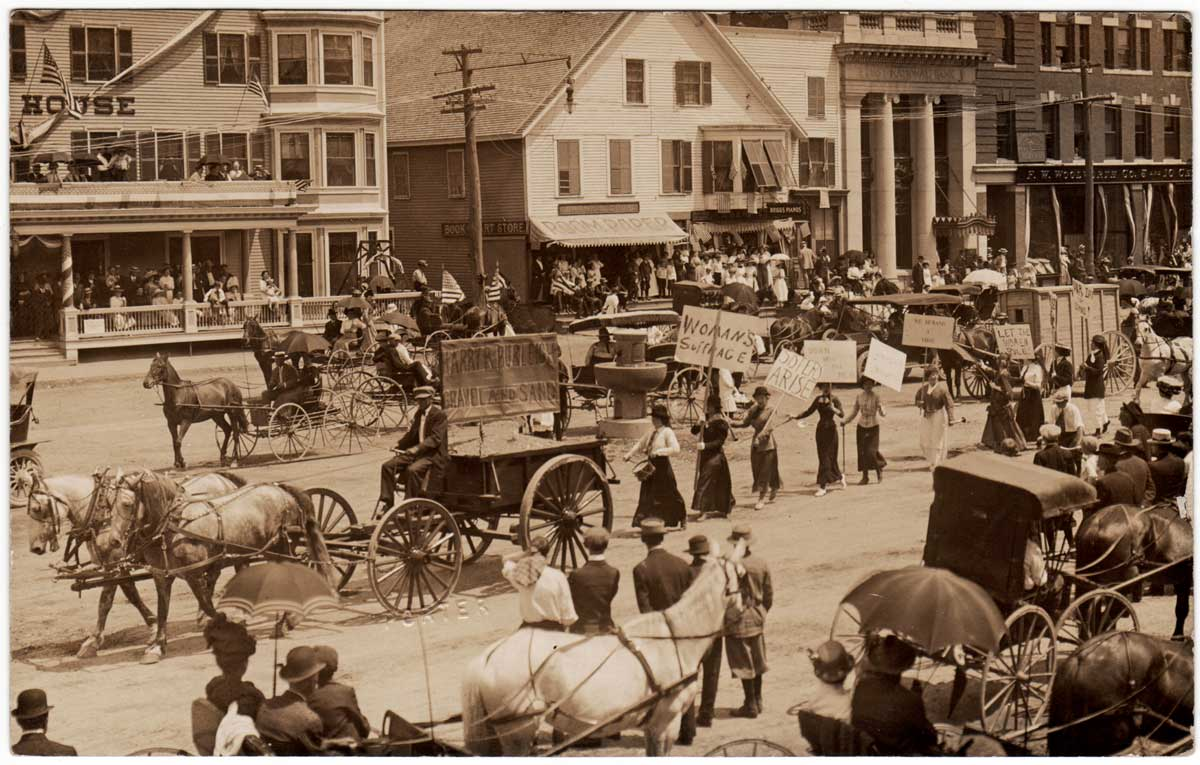
Suffragists parade in Market Square in Houlton, Maine, 1917

This is a timeline of women's suffrage in Maine. Suffragists began campaigning in Maine in the mid 1850s. A lecture series was started by Ann F. Jarvis Greely and other women in Ellsworth, Maine in 1857. The first women's suffrage petition to the Maine Legislature was sent that same year. Women continue to fight for equal suffrage throughout the 1860s and 1870s. The Maine Woman Suffrage Association (MWSA) is established in 1873 and the next year, the first Woman's Christian Temperance Union (WCTU) chapter was started. In 1887, the Maine Legislature votes on a women's suffrage amendment to the state constitution, but it does not receive the necessary two-thirds vote. Additional attempts to pass women's suffrage legislation receives similar treatment throughout the rest of the century. In the twentieth century, suffragists continue to organize and meet. Several suffrage groups form, including the Maine chapter of the College Equal Suffrage League in 1914 and the Men's Equal Suffrage League of Maine in 1914. In 1917, a voter referendum on women's suffrage is scheduled for September 10, but fails at the polls. On November 5, 1919 Maine ratifies the Nineteenth Amendment. On September 13, 1920, most women in Maine are able to vote. Native Americans in Maine are barred from voting for many years. In 1924, Native Americans became American citizens. In 1954, a voter referendum for Native American voting rights passes. The next year, Lucy Nicolar Poolaw (Penobscot), is the first Native American living on an Indian reservation to cast a vote.

== 19th century ==
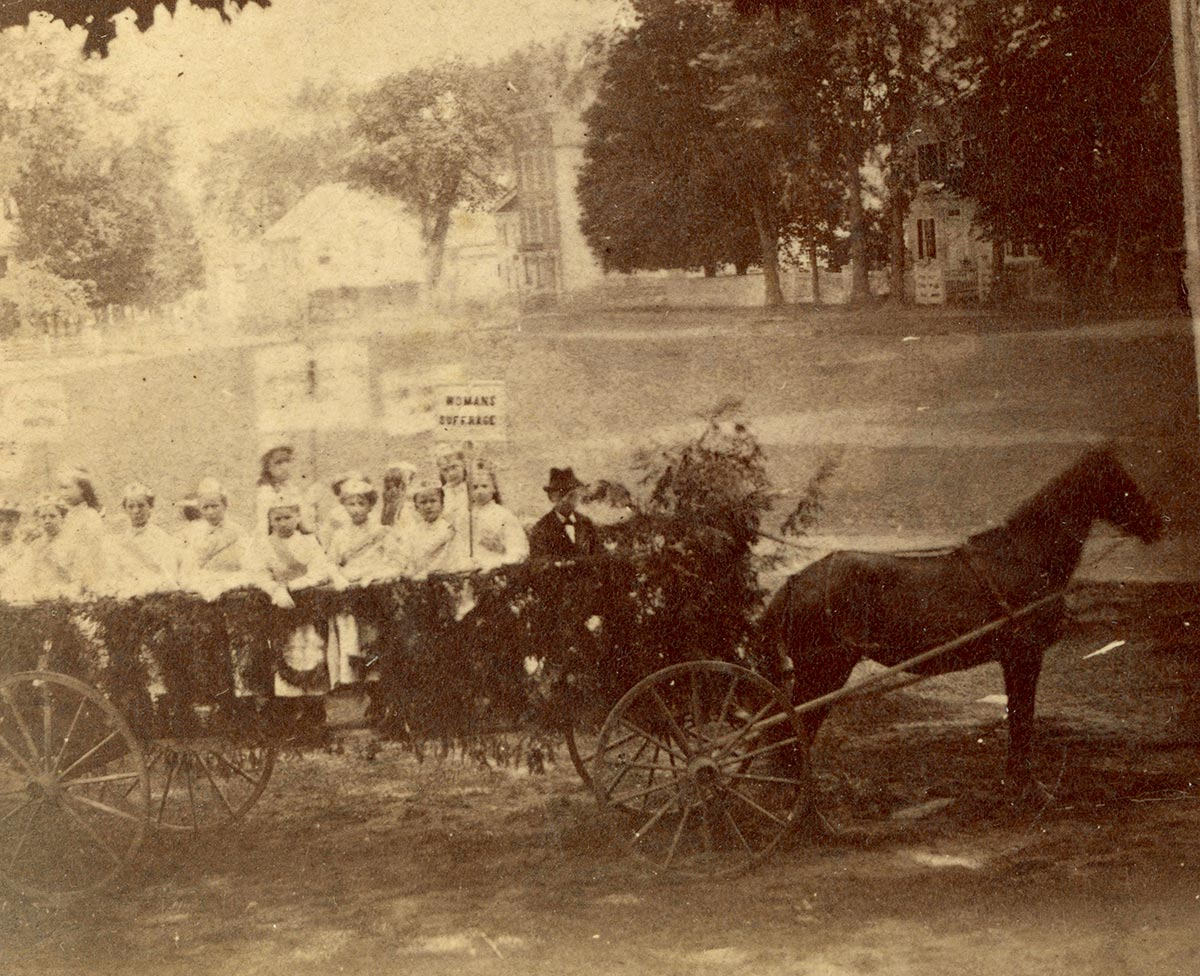
"The Coming Woman" float in Bethel, Maine 1874

=== 1830s ===
1832

- John Neal calls for women's suffrage in an Independence Day oration at the Second Parish Church in Portland.

=== 1850s ===
1854

- Susan B. Anthony speaks in Bangor.

1855

- Lucy Stone lectures in Augusta and Cornish.

1857

- The first women's suffrage petition to the Maine Legislature is sent by Lucy Stone, Antoinette Brown Blackwell, and signed by both men and women from Bangor, Maine.
- Ann F. Jarvis Greely and Sarah Jarvis create a women's rights lecture series in Ellsworth.
- March: Anthony speaks at one of the Ellsworth lectures.
- July 3–4: Hill, Greely and Jarvis host a women's rights ball at Whiting's Hall.
- July 15: Caroline B. Dall gives two speeches for the Ellsworth lectures.

1858

- A second women's suffrage petition is presented to the Maine Legislature.

=== 1860s ===
1865

- Women factory workers march for the right to vote in the Lewiston Independence Day parade.

1868

- Lavinia Snow and her sister, Lucy Snow, form the Equal Rights Association of Rockland.

1869

- May: Lucy Snow attends the American Equal Rights Association (AERA) convention in New York.

=== 1870s ===
1870

- John Neal calls for a women's suffrage convention in Portland.

1871

- November: Mary Livermore speaks to around 1,000 people in Portland on women's suffrage.
- Margaret W. Campbell lectures on women's suffrage in Belfast and Freedom.

1872

- Women's suffrage petitions are submitted to the Maine Legislature.
- Campbell continues her suffrage lecture tour, visiting Bath, Belfast, Camden, Damariscotta, and Rockland.

1873

- January 29: A women's suffrage convention is held in Augusta, with hundreds attending.
- The Maine Woman Suffrage Association (MWSA) is established.
- Lucy Snow presents a women's suffrage petition from Rockland to the Maine Legislature.
- Adelaide Emerson presents a petition from Ellsworth to the legislature.

1874

- March 5: Mrs. C. V. Crossman starts the first Women's Christian Temperance Union (WCTU) chapter in Maine.
- Suffragists have a float in the Centennial Parade in Bethel.

=== 1880s ===
1881

- June: The American Woman Suffrage Association (AWSA) holds a convention in Portland, at City Hall.

1884

- Thomas Brackett Reed writes a report in favor of a federal women's suffrage amendment.

1885

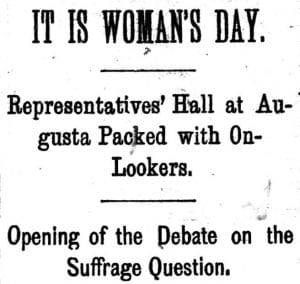
"It Is Woman's Day" 1895-03-07 Lewiston Evening Journal

- September: The New England Woman Suffrage Association (NEWSA), helps reorganized and regenerate the state women's suffrage group.

1887

- A women's suffrage petition is presented to the state legislature. The legislature votes on a women's suffrage amendment, but it does not receive the necessary two-thirds vote.

1889

- Elizabeth M. Young Allen writes to the state legislature for the right to vote.
- A municipal suffrage bill fails in the state legislature.

=== 1890s ===
1891

- Hannah Johnston Bailey becomes president of MWSA.
- The state women's suffrage convention is held in Portland.

1892

- A suffrage club was formed in Portland.
- The state women's suffrage convention is held in Portland.

1893

- The state women's suffrage convention is held in Portland.

1894

- The state women's suffrage convention is held in Portland.

1895

- More than 9,000 names were collected by suffragists and members of the WCTU in support of municipal suffrage in Maine. A municipal suffrage bill is not successful.
- The state women's suffrage convention is held in Portland.

1896

- The state women's suffrage convention is held in Portland.

1899

- A bill to exempt women taxpayers from paying taxes was presented in the state legislature. This was done since women could not vote, they were being taxed without being represented, according to the bill.

== 20th century ==
=== 1900s ===
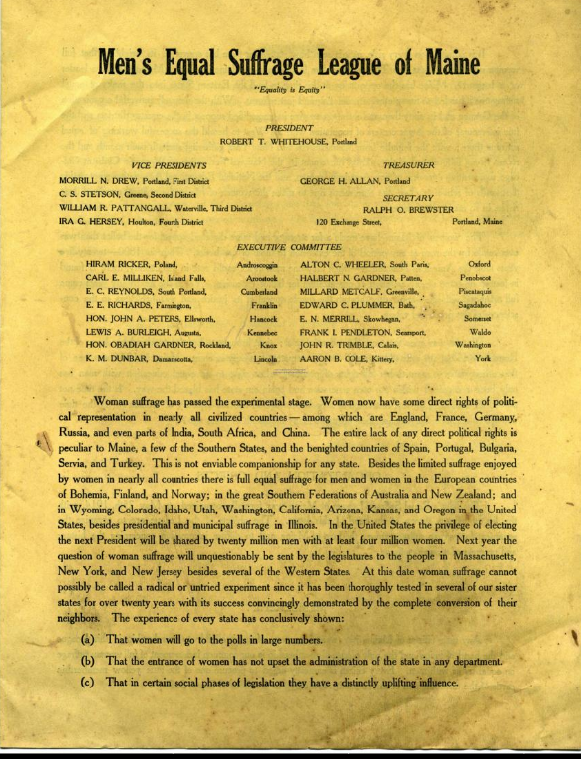
Men's Equal Suffrage League of Maine

1900

- May: Public suffrage meetings were held in Cornish, Hampden, Monmouth, Old Orchard, Portland, Saco, Waterville, and Winthrop. These were organized by Boston lawyer, Diana Hirschler, who also was the featured speaker.
- August: During "Old Home Week," suffragists hosted around 232 people during an open house event.
- August 24: Suffrage Day is held at Ocean Park in Old Orchard.

1902

- The state women's suffrage convention is held in Saco.

1903

- The state women's suffrage convention is held in Auburn.

1904

- The state women's suffrage convention is held in Portland.

1906

- The Maine Federation of Labor endorses women's suffrage.
- The state women's suffrage convention is held in Saco.

1907

- The state women's suffrage convention is held in Farmington and suffragists vote to support a federal suffrage amendment.

1908

- The state women's suffrage convention is held in Portland.

1909

- March 3: Fannie J. Fernald testifies in front of the United States Senate Committee on Woman Suffrage.
- The state women's suffrage convention is held in Old Orchard.

=== 1910s ===
1910

- The state women's suffrage convention is held in Portland.

1912

- October: The state women's suffrage convention is held.

1913

- The Maine Association Opposed to Suffrage for Women (MAOSW) is formed.
- The College Equal Suffrage League of Maine is formed.
- The state women's suffrage convention is held in Portland.
- March 3: Suffragists march in the Woman Suffrage Procession in Washington, D. C.

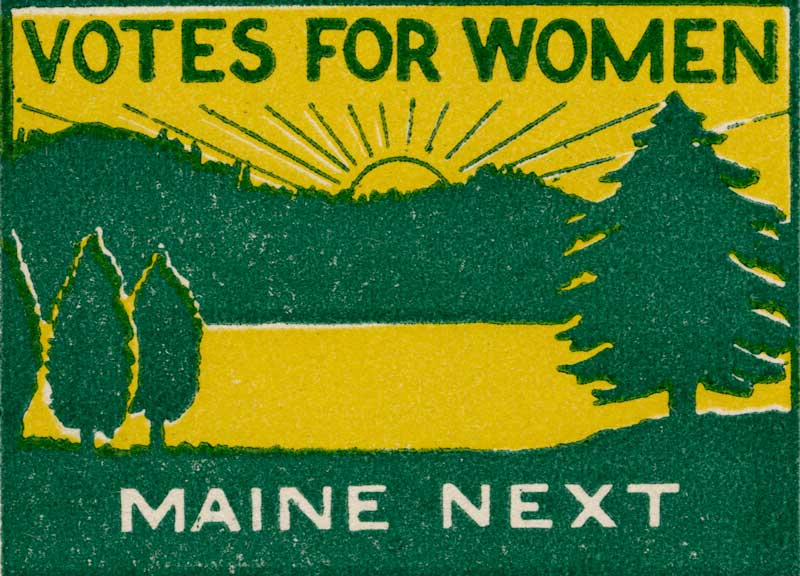
Votes for Women - Maine Next 1917 Stamp

1914

- The Men's Equal Suffrage League of Maine is formed.
- The state women's suffrage convention is held in Portland.

1915

- A resolution to pass a full women's suffrage amendment passes the state legislature.
- The state women's suffrage convention is held in Kennebunk.
- Florence Brooks Whitehouse founds the Maine chapter of the Congressional Union.

1916

- February: Suffrage conference held to discuss a federal suffrage amendment, with speakers Carrie Chapman Catt, Elizabeth Glendower Evans, and Maud Wood Park in attendance.
- August: The first meeting of the Belfast Suffrage League is held.

1917

- January: The National American Woman Suffrage Association (NAWSA) held a suffrage school in Portland.
- February: The state legislature submits a women's suffrage amendment.
- September 10: The women's suffrage amendment fails in the voter referendum.
- September: The state women's suffrage convention takes place in Augusta.

1918

- October: The state women's suffrage convention takes place in Lewiston.

1919

- March: An act for women to vote for presidential electors is proposed and passed.
- The state women's suffrage convention takes place in Portland.
- July 3: The presidential electors bill is placed on the next ballot as a referendum.
- November 5: Maine ratifies the Nineteenth Amendment.
- November 12: At a meeting in Augusta, MWSA dissolves and reforms as the League of Women Voters (LWV) of Maine.

=== 1920s ===
1920

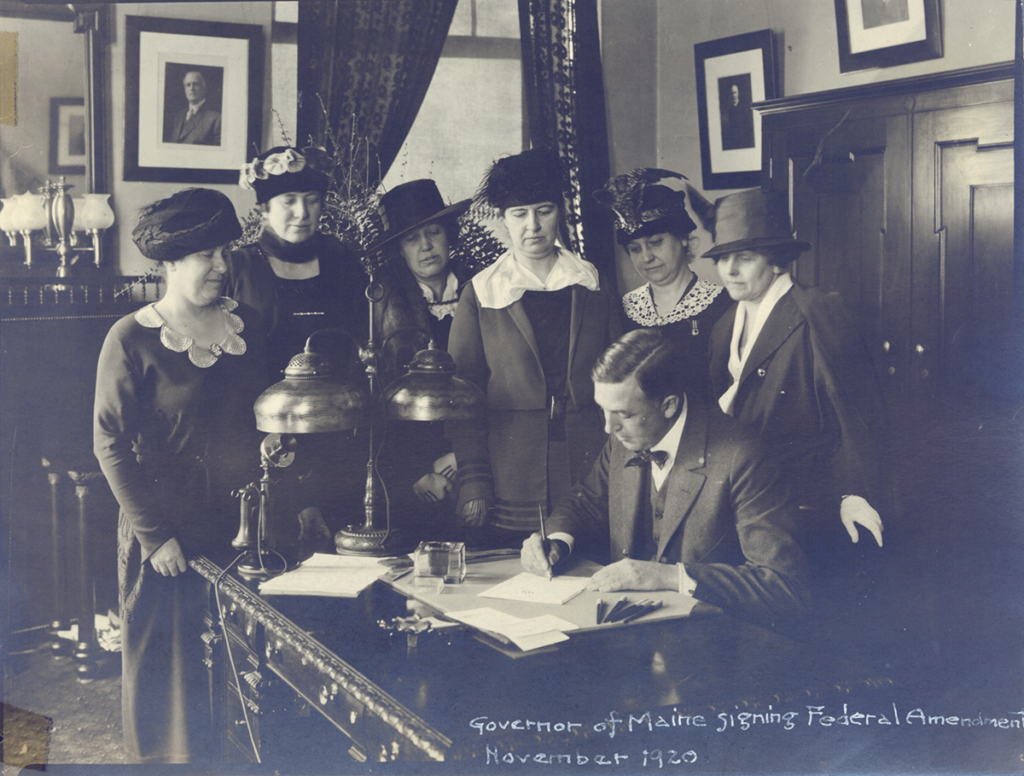
Governor Milliken signing Maine's ratification, November 1920

- August 26: The Nineteenth Amendment is adopted by the United States.
- August 30: Lewiston opens books for women to register to vote.
- September 1: Portland starts registering voters, and Augusta M. Hunt was the first in line.
- September 13: Women vote in the general election for the first time, and also vote on the presidential elector bill, which passes.

1924

- Native Americans are finally considered United States citizens, but those in Maine still could not vote.

=== 1950s ===
1954

- Voter referendum for Native American suffrage in Maine passes.

1955

- Lucy Nicolar Poolaw (Penobscot) is the first Native American living on a reservation to vote in Maine.

== See also ==
- List of Maine suffragists
- Women's suffrage in Maine
- Native Americans and women's suffrage in the United States
- Women's suffrage in states of the United States
- Women's suffrage in the United States
