= Women's suffrage in Maine =

U.S. state gender equality movement

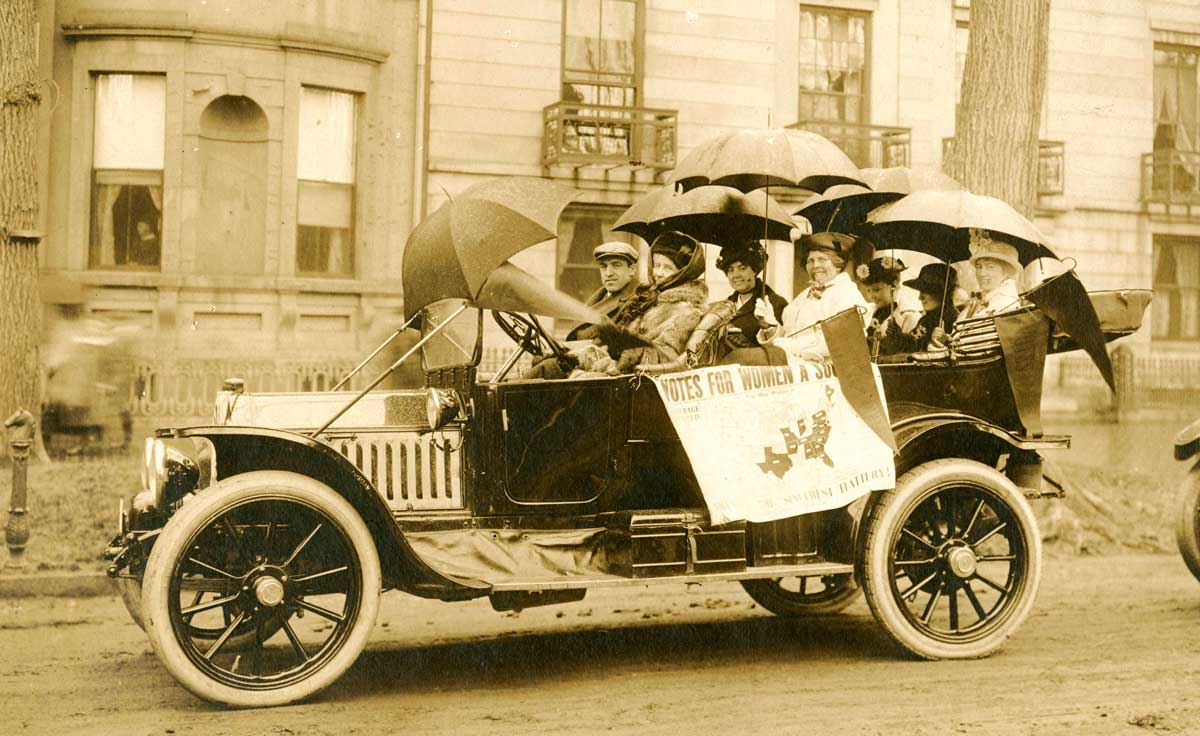
Florence Brooks Whitehouse driving with suffragists in Portland, Maine in 1914

While women's suffrage had an early start in Maine, dating back to the 1850s, it was a long, slow road to equal suffrage. Early suffragists brought speakers Susan B. Anthony and Lucy Stone to the state in the mid-1850s. Ann F. Jarvis Greely and other women in Ellsworth, Maine, created a women's rights lecture series in 1857. The first women's suffrage petition to the Maine Legislature was also sent that year. Working-class women began marching for women's suffrage in the 1860s. The Snow sisters created the first Maine women's suffrage organization, the Equal Rights Association of Rockland, in 1868.

In the 1870s, a state suffrage organization, the Maine Women's Suffrage Association (MWSA), was formed. Many petitions for women's suffrage were sent to the state legislature. MWSA and the Woman's Christian Temperance Union (WCTU) of Maine worked closely together on suffrage issues. By the late 1880s the state legislature was considering several women's suffrage bills. While women's suffrage did not pass, during the 1890s many women's rights laws were secured. During the 1900s, suffragists in Maine continued to campaign and lecture on women's suffrage.

Several suffrage organizations including a Maine chapter of the College Equal Suffrage League and the Men's Equal Rights League were formed in the 1910s. Florence Brooks Whitehouse started the Maine chapter of the National Woman's Party (NWP) in 1915. Suffragists and other clubwomen worked together on a large campaign for a 1917 voter referendum on women's suffrage. Despite the efforts of women around the state, women's suffrage failed. Going into the next few years, a women's suffrage referendum on voting in presidential elections was placed on the September 13, 1920 ballot. But before that vote, Maine ratified the Nineteenth Amendment on November 5, 1920. It was the nineteenth state to ratify.

A few weeks after ratification, MWSA dissolved and formed the League of Women Voters (LWV) of Maine. White women first voted in Maine on September 13, 1920. Native Americans in Maine had to wait longer to vote. In 1924, they became citizens of the United States. However, Maine would not allow individuals living on Indian reservations to vote. It was not until the passage of a 1954 equal rights referendum that Native Americans gained the right to vote in Maine. In 1955 Lucy Nicolar Poolaw (Penobscot) was the first Native American living on a reservation in Maine to cast a vote.

== Early efforts ==
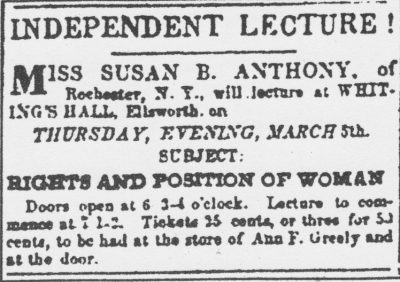
Susan B. Anthony lecture, Ellsworth, Maine, March 5, 1857

The first public advocacy of women's suffrage in Maine is an 1832 Independence Day speech by John Neal in Portland, in which Neal described the denial of suffrage to women as equivalent to taxation without representation. By the 1850s, Maine was in a state of transition. The abolition movement was important and the temperance movement started to draw more women in Maine. The country's first alcohol prohibition law passed in Maine in 1851. Women's rights also grew in support during the 1850s. Susan B. Anthony came to Maine and gave a lecture in Bangor in 1854. Suffragist Lucy Stone spoke on women's suffrage in Augusta and Cornish in 1855. In Ellsworth, Maine, several women's rights advocates began to work towards women's rights and women's suffrage. Ann F. Jarvis Greely, who had attended the Seneca Falls Convention in 1848, wanted to take action on promoting rights for women. Greely, her sister Sarah Jarvis, and Charlotte Hill worked together to create a committee to bring women's rights lecturers to Ellsworth. The lectures started in 1857. In March of that year, Anthony spoke to a "packed hall" in Ellsworth. There were some threats against the controversial nature of the lecture series, however, overall, the series was "widely attended." In addition to the lectures, the three women hosted a "woman's rights" ball on the evenings of July 3 and 4, 1857 in Ellsworth. Both Greely and Hill also wrote to newspapers under pseudonyms advocating and arguing for improving women's access to equal right. Hill also brought women's rights materials for women to share and distribute. The first women's suffrage petition in Maine, known as a "memorial" was sent to the Maine Legislature in 1857. A second memorial, signed prominently by Greely and Hill, was presented to the legislature in 1858. Maine was one of the first states in the country to petition its legislature on women's suffrage.

Working factory women marched in the Lewiston Independence Day Parade in 1865, promoting women's suffrage. The first women's suffrage group in the state was formed by Lavina Snow, Lucy Snow, and Elvira Snow in Rockland, Maine in 1868. The group, announced to the office of The Revolution, was called the Equal Rights Association of Rockland. Lucy Snow also attended the American Equal Rights Association (AERA) convention in New York in May 1869.

Into the 1870s, suffrage efforts continued. Margaret W. Campbell lectured in 1871 and 1872 in several Maine towns, including Bath, Belfast, Camden, Damariscotta, Freedom, and Rockland. John Neal in Portland called for the city's first women's suffrage convention in 1870. This led to petitions sent to the state legislature in 1872. Lydia Neal Dennett helped lead the petition campaign. Lucy Snow presented their own petition for women's suffrage from Rockland to the Maine Legislature in 1873. Adelaide Emerson in Ellsworth also sent the legislature an 1873 women's suffrage petition. Also in 1873, a call for women's suffrage convention went out in January. Hundreds of attendees came to the convention, held in Augusta on January 29. At the convention, Julia Ward Howe and Stone were featured speakers. Later, the Maine Women's Suffrage Association (MWSA) was formed. The first president was Joshua Nye and a year later, Benjamin Kingsbury served until 1876.

In Maine, many suffrage efforts were supported by the Women's Christian Temperance Union (WCTU). The first WCTU chapter was created in Bangor on March 5, 1874. In Maine, women who were leaders in WCTU were often also leaders in the suffrage movement and in the abolition movement. Their work in WCTU gave them valuable experience working in politics. In 1876, the first woman to serve as president of MWSA was Cordelia A. Quinby. However, after 1876, the MWSA largely stopped meeting and Quinby continued to keep MWSA alive during the slow years between 1876 and 1885. While the suffrage work slowed, the WCTU continued to grow.

== Renewed efforts ==
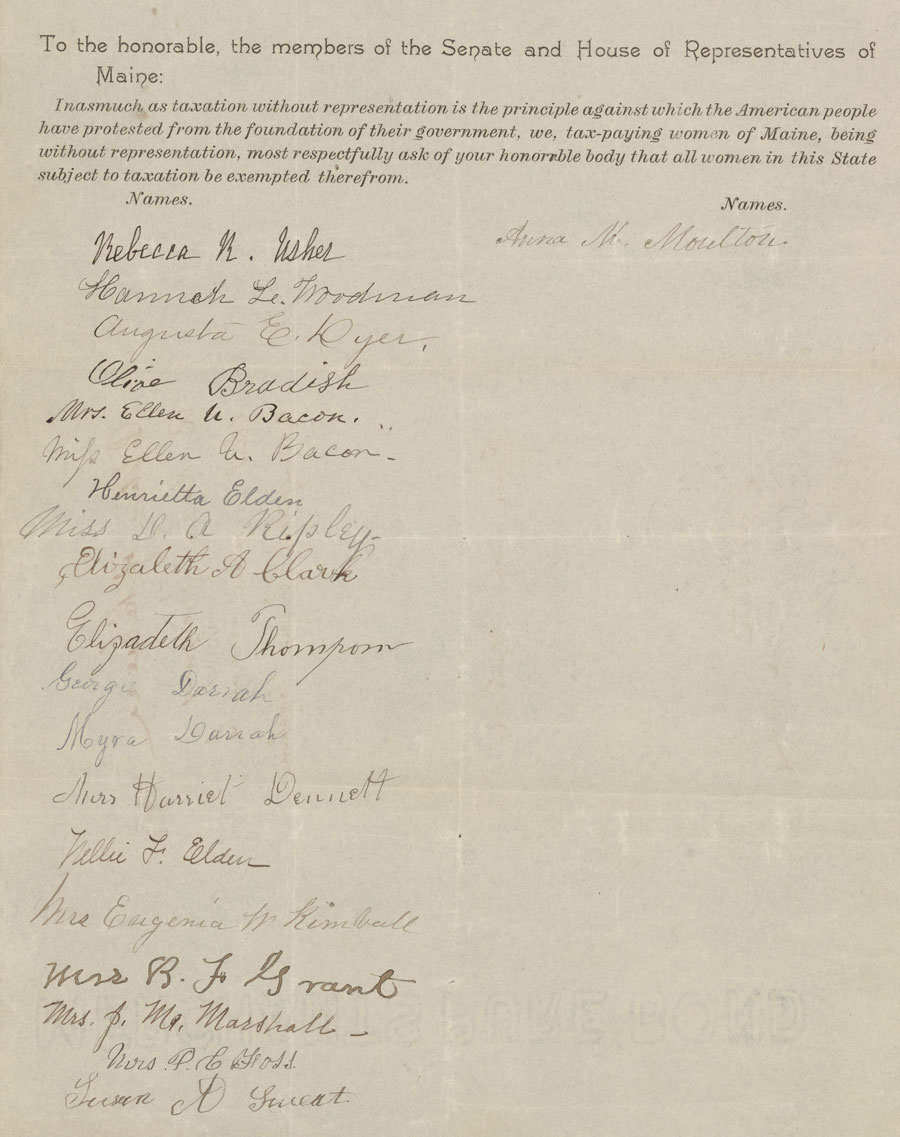
1899 women's suffrage petition in Maine

In June 1881, the American Woman Suffrage Association (AWSA) held a suffrage convention in Portland. In 1884, Thomas Brackett Reed, the leader of the Republican Party in Maine, drafted a report in support of a proposed women's suffrage amendment. The revival of a state suffrage organization was due to the influence of the New England Woman Suffrage Association (NEWSA). A convention was held in September 1885 in cooperation with NEWSA where the Maine Woman Suffrage Association (MWSA) was revived. Henry Blanchard, a pastor of the Unitarian Church in Portland, became the president of MWSA.

Women's suffrage petitions resumed in 1887, bearing signatures from around Maine. Women asked for an amendment to the state constitution for women's suffrage. In the state legislature, the amendment was presented and received majority votes from the House and the Senate, but not the two-thirds needed to pass. Two years later, in 1889, suffragists presented the legislature an even larger petition that encompassed signatures from an even greater area of the state. Petitioners asked for school board or municipal suffrage. That year, the vote for municipal suffrage for women passed in the state Senate, but not in the House.

In 1891, Hannah J. Bailey took over MWSA. Bailey, a Quaker, was involved in both the WCTU and peace activism. Bailey testified on women's suffrage in front of the Maine Legislature, claiming that women should vote because women were better suited to make laws that would guard children's needs and interests. She also believed that women's involvement in politics would end war. WCTU members were energized in 1893, and suffragists and temperance activists sent the state legislature more petitions for women's suffrage. In 1895, the WCTU and Lillian M. N. Stevens helped support the municipal suffrage campaign again, sending more than 9,000 names in favor to the state legislature. During hearings on the bill, the gallery was crowded with spectators from every county in Maine. Nevertheless, this effort failed in the state Senate.

While efforts for women's suffrage failed, MWSA had a successful campaign for women's right to own legal titles to property and dower rights. Women gained the right to testify against their husbands in divorce cases, and earned equal custody of their own children. MWSA helped raise girls' "age of protection" from 10 to 16 years old. During Bailey's presidency, six state women's suffrage conventions were held in Portland. Local groups were created in Hampden, Portland, Saco, and Waterville. Bailey stepped down in 1897 and Lucy Hobart Day took over MWSA. Day promoted suffrage parades, recruitment at colleges, and "open houses" to promote women's suffrage. Petitions to the state legislature continued in 1897. MWSA created a "press bureau" in 1898 and Sarah G. Crosby worked as the head of the division. More divisions in MWSA were created, modeled after the hierarchy of the WCTU. The Maine Legislature in 1899 briefly considered a bill exempting taxation of women because they were currently disenfranchised.

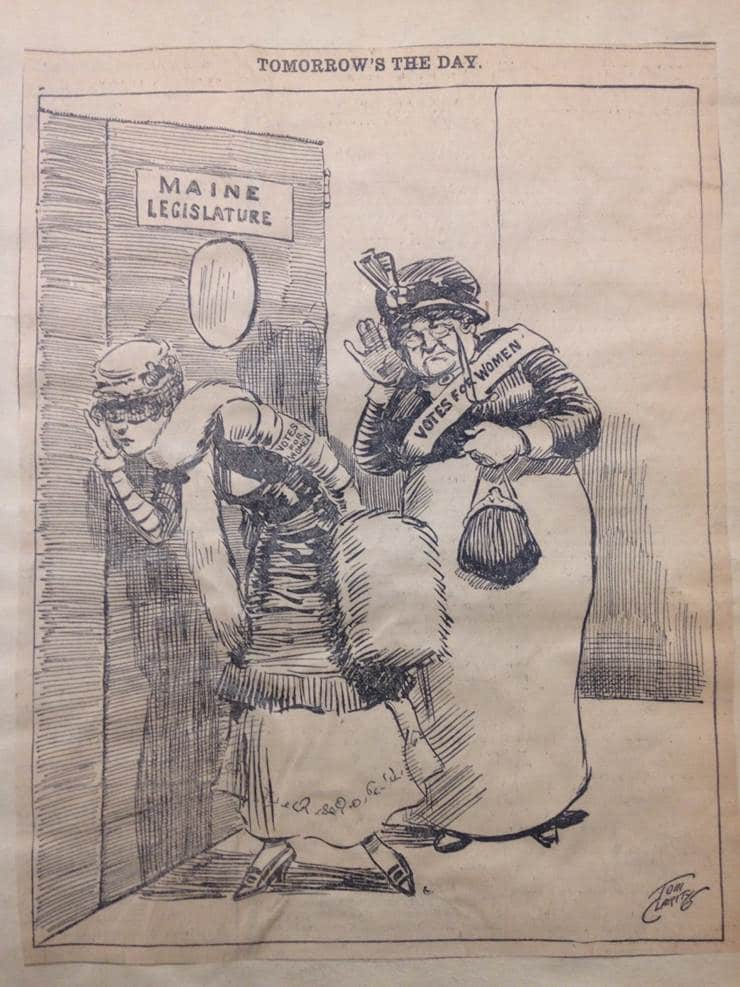
"Tomorrow's the Day," Cartoon by Tom Clancy, 1915

Suffragists held a state convention at Old Orchard Beach in August 1900. Carrie Chapman Catt was a featured guest, speaking on behalf of the National American Woman Suffrage Association (NAWSA). Elizabeth Upham Yates had strong ties to NAWSA and helped MWSA partner with the national group. In 1902 Day worked with the executive staff at MWSA to put letters on the desk of each Maine state legislator about women's suffrage. The letters asked why women were being taxed the same as men, but still not able to vote.

After Day retired in 1905, Fannie J. Fernald was elected president of the MWSA. Fernald canvassed throughout all of Maine and gave speeches to various organizations. Fernald brought reports of MWSA to the NAWSA conventions and also to the NEWSA meetings. The Maine Federation of Labor endorsed women's suffrage in Maine in 1906. Fernald reached out to rural Maine in her speaking tour of the state in the summer of 1909. On February 17, Fernald spoke on women's suffrage at the Judiciary Committee of the Maine House.

L. Alfreda Brewster Wallace served as president of MWSA in 1911. In 1912, Helen N. Bates was elected president of MWSA. On Woman's Day in 1912, Bates thanked the Socialist Party as being the only one in the U.S. advocating for women's suffrage. Suffragists from Maine marched in the Woman Suffrage Procession. Suffragists were also hopeful that women's suffrage legislation would pass in 1913. A chapter of the College Equal Suffrage League was formed in Maine that year. Bates told the Woman's Journal that there "can be no question" that women would get the right to vote within the year.

In 1914, the Men's Equal Rights League of Maine was established. The president was Robert Treat Whitehouse, and prominent men in Maine joined the group. In 1915, Deborah Knox Livingston spoke to the state legislative committee on women's suffrage and gender equality. The legislators passed a resolution to pass an equal suffrage amendment.

== Amendments lost and won ==
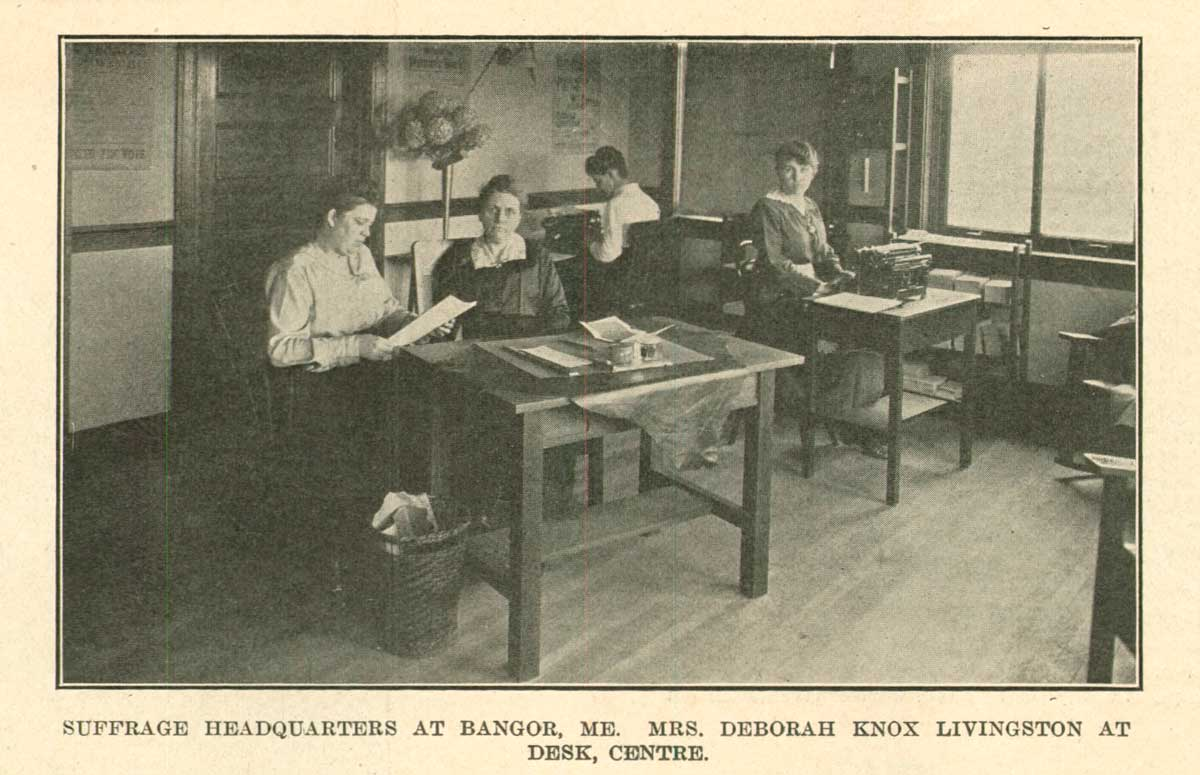
Suffrage Headquarters in Bangor Maine, September 1917

Florence Brooks Whitehouse changed the tone of women's suffrage activism in Maine when she joined the more militant Congressional Union (CU). In the summer of 1915 Florence Kelley worked with Whitehouse to create the Maine branch of the CU. The MWSA did not approve of the tactics of the CU, later known as the National Women's Party (NWP). Whitehouse was the chair of the CU and the NWP from 1915 to 1920. Whitehouse was one of the women who picketed against President Woodrow Wilson, both in Chicago and at the White House. She also campaigned against Wilson in Wyoming in 1916.

A conference was held in Portland in February 1916 on the subject of supporting a federal women's suffrage amendment. Catt, Elizabeth Glendower Evans, and Maud Wood Park were speakers at the event which was attended by women from around the state. Bates resigned from MWSA due to health concerns and Augusta M. Hunt became the next president for the rest of Bates' term. NAWSA sent a national organizer, Augusta Hughston, to help coordinate the suffrage campaigns in the state. In October at the state suffrage convention, Katherine Reed Balentine, was elected the next president of MWSA. Suffragists in MWSA felt that it was again time to push for a suffrage amendment to the state constitution.

From January 8 to January 20, 1917, NAWSA held a suffrage school in Portland in readiness for the upcoming campaign. Subjects covered included the history of the women's suffrage movement and practical subjects such as organizing, getting publicity, fundraising, and public speaking. Sophia P. Anthoine and Mabel B. Cobb from MWSA brought suffrage schools to other towns around Maine. In early February, Catt met with the MWSA board at Balentine's home in Portland. Catt had already advised in 1916 against the MWSA pushing for a state equal suffrage amendment. She cautioned that there was not enough money or people secured for a full suffrage campaign and that resources would be better devoted to asking for limited suffrage, which would be easier to pass. MWSA chose to go forward with the campaign and a state women's suffrage amendment was submitted in February. On February 1, 1917, more than 1,000 women attended the suffrage hearing for the amendment bill. There were so many women inside the state House that women were even sitting on window sills. Suffragists wore white roses and presented the House with 5,000 cards signed in support of women's suffrage. The bill passed, and a referendum for the amendment would be held on September 10, 1917.

Campaign headquarters were set up in Bangor. The different suffrage groups in the state set aside their differences to campaign for the amendment. The NWP members in Maine formed the Suffrage Referendum League to campaign for the vote. Other groups, such as the WCTU and the Maine Federation of Women's Clubs (MFWC) also contributed to the effort. The entry of the United States into World War I had a significant effect on the suffrage campaign. Many people were focused on supporting the war effort and money needed for the suffrage effort was channeled into war preparedness. Maine suffragists used the war effort to encourage people to support equal suffrage and that women's suffrage was patriotic.

Suffragists used the time they had to campaign as much as possible in the state. Deborah Knox Livingston traveled more than 200,000 miles campaigning around Maine and raised $4,000. Suffragists distributed around 1,500,000 pro-suffrage leaflets around Maine, sometimes going house to house. A petition containing more than 38,000 signatures of women asking for equal suffrage was circulated to counter the claim that women didn't really want the vote. NAWSA posters were found everywhere throughout the state, posted to trees, fences, and windows. More than 500 suffrage meetings took place during the last three months of the campaign. Nevertheless, the 1917 vote on September 10 did not go well for suffragists, failing with a large margin. The press and other pundits blamed the loss partially on the NWP whose militant tactics had generated negative publicity for the suffrage movement. Other possible causes included a socially conservative society in Maine, voter apathy, and the "distraction of WWI."

Mabel Connor was elected the next president of MWSA at the September 1917 convention in Augusta. MWSA decided to pursue a limited suffrage issue in 1918, pushing for women's right to vote for the president. Also in 1918, Maine suffragist, Georgie Nickerson Whitten, advocated for voting by mail for caregivers. A member of the Socialist Party, Whitten also advocated for Socialists to recruit more women in their organizations, as well as arming them with equal suffrage. In 1918, Whitehouse worked with Alice Paul on the passage of the federal suffrage amendment in the U.S. Congress. All four of Maine's representatives in the U.S. House voted for the passage of the amendment. However, Senator Frederick Hale, who was personally supportive of women's suffrage, would not vote for the amendment because of the outcome of the September 10 voter referendum against suffrage. Whitehouse and Paul turned to lobbying Hale to change his mind. They got three-quarters of the state legislators to sign a petition calling on Hale to change his vote in the U.S. Senate. On June 4, 1919, the U.S. Senate passed the federal amendment, and Senator Hale changed his vote after the fact. He was praised in the press for his "vision and commitment to suffrage" even though his vote did not make the difference in this case.

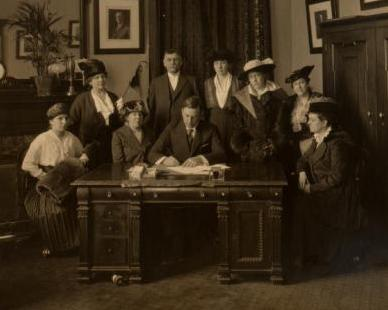
Signing of the women suffrage proclamation in 1917

In February 1919, the presidential suffrage bill proposed earlier by MWSA was introduced to the Maine Legislature by Senator Guy Gannett. After a public hearing before the Judiciary Committee of the Maine Senate, the bill passed that chamber on February 26. On March 19, it passed the state House. Anti-suffragists immediately went to work to submit the Presidential Suffrage Law to voters as a ballot initiative. Anti-suffragists used funds to pay people to gather signatures. With the help of State Forest Commissioner, Frank E. Mace, the antis secured around 12,000 signatures and turned them into the government on July 3. After consultation by the Maine Supreme Court, the initiative was placed on the next general election ballot to be held on September 13, 1920. Suffragists held a convention in Portland in October 1919, where they voted to hold a School for Citizenship in August 1920 at Bates College.

When the Federal Suffrage Amendment passed and went to the states to ratify, Governor Carl E. Milliken called for a special legislative session in November 1919. Whitehouse, Paul, Dora Lewis, and other suffragists traveled to Augusta to attend the proceedings. It passed the state Senate easily with a vote of 24 to 5. In the state House, members representing the Maine Federation of Labor (MFL) which opposed the federal amendment, held up proceedings. Whitehouse, Paul and Lewis all went to meet with MFL officers immediately to attempt to change their minds. These women were able to get the MFL president to publicly change his stance on the amendment. There was a heated debate about whether the amendment should be voted on now, or if Maine should wait for the voter referendum on presidential suffrage. In the end, on November 5, Maine ratified the Nineteenth Amendment. The final tally in the state House was 72 for and 68 against, making Maine the nineteenth state to ratify.

At a state suffrage meeting in Augusta on November 12, MWSA dissolved and reformed as the League of Women Voters (LWV) of Maine. The Nineteenth Amendment was adopted as an official amendment to the U.S. Constitution on August 26, 1920. When women went to the polls to vote in their first general election on September 13, they were also able to vote for the Presidential Suffrage Bill that had been placed on the ballot. It passed easily.

== Native American suffrage in Maine ==
Lydia Neal Dennett led Maine's first petition campaign for Native American suffrage in 1872 — the same year she led the first women's suffrage petition campaign. Yet indigenous women fought much longer for equal suffrage in Maine. Native American people gained United States citizenship in 1924. The federal government left the decision to the states about allowing Native Americans to vote and Maine barred them from voting if they lived on a reservation. Lucy Nicolar Poolaw (Penobscot) and her sister, Florence Shay (Penobscot), campaigned for equal suffrage for Native Americans in the state. A voter referendum for equal suffrage for Native Americans living on reservations passed in 1954. The next year, Poolaw became the first Native American living on reservation to vote. Despite this win, Native Americans in Maine continued to have difficulty voting in state elections.

== Anti-suffragists in Maine ==
Anti-suffragists in Maine corresponded with the Massachusetts Association Opposed to the Further Extension of Suffrage to Women (MAOFESW). Many upper-class women from the Portland area were interested in opposing women's suffrage. Maine anti-suffragists first sent petitions or "remonstrances" against women's suffrage to the Maine Legislature in 1887. The next round of petitions in 1889 had even more signatures.

In 1913, the Maine Association Opposed to Suffrage for Women (MAOSW) was created and affiliated with a national suffrage group, the National Association Opposed to Woman Suffrage (NAOWS). Women in the Maine chapter claimed that most women didn't want to vote and shouldn't have voting rights "forced" onto them.

== See also ==
- List of Maine suffragists
- Timeline of women's suffrage in Maine
- Native Americans and women's suffrage in the United States
- Women's suffrage in states of the United States
- Women's suffrage in the United States
