= Camille Lessard-Bissonnette =

Canadian-American suffragist and writer (1883–1970)

Camille Lessard-Bissonnette, 1883–1970, pen name Liane, was a Canadian-American suffragist and writer, who contributed to Le Messager from 1906 to 1938.

Lessard-Bissonnette immigrated with her family from Quebec where she was a teacher, and then became a mill worker in Lewiston, Maine at the Continental Mill. She then became a columnist for Le Messager, Lewiston. She wrote pro-the-vote for women in 1910-11—two years before the conversation even began in Canada. Le Messager moved to 223 Lisbon Street, Lewiston where she wrote her articles about suffrage as well as many other issues concerning women's lives.

The Franco-American culture was closed off to the conversation of suffrage both in the Franco-American immigrant group and in the mainstream, and plus, for Camille, due to language barrier, she was not recognized in the early Maine women's suffrage movement.

Lessard-Bissonnette is one of 2,200 women listed in The National Collaborative for Women's History Sites, The National Votes for Women Trail. Lessard-Bissonnette is the only Franco-American woman in the Online Biographical Dictionary of the Woman Suffrage Movement in the United States.

Camille wrote, in French, about the French-Canadian woman's immigrant experience, Canuck, which was published by Le Messager, as a series, feuilleton, after she had left the U.S., in the 1930s. Janet Shideler, Ph.D., her biographer, wrote Camille Lessard-Bissonnette: The Quiet Evolution of French-Canadian Immigrants in New England. Lessard-Bissonnette's book, Canuck, has been translated into English by Sylvie Charron, Ph.D. and Sue Huseman, Ph.D.

A lecture on Camille and other Franco-American women legislators illustrates the modeling of Camille's work in regard to suffrage, titled, "Lecture: Franco-American Women, Suffrage and Political Activity in Maine."
