= Peter Nourse =

American clergyman and librarian

- Born: October 10, 1774; Bolton
- Died: March 25, 1840 (aged 65); Phippsburg
- Employer: Harvard College

Peter Nourse (October 10, 1774 – March 25, 1840) was an American clergyman and librarian.

Nourse, born October 10, 1774, at Bolton, Massachusetts, was the son of Jonathan and Ruth (Barret) Nourse. He graduated from Harvard College in 1802, received the A.M. in course, and was Harvard College Librarian for three years from 1805 to 1808.

In 1810, he and his wife Polly, daughter of Rev. Caleb Barnum of Taunton, moved to Ellsworth, Maine, where, 9 September 1812, he was ordained over the newly established Congregational church. The ordination sermon was by Rev. Samuel Kendal and the charge by Ezra Ripley. Here he lived as pastor and at least part of the time as schoolmaster, until 1835, when he either was dismissed or resigned. According to Ellsworth church historian Wayne Smith, his "Unitarian, or at least 'liberal', leanings eventually created some controversy among his parishioners", resulting in a decline in membership.

His wife had died previously to this, and, as he had no children, he went to live, first with his brother, Dr. Amos Nourse, at Bath, and then with his nephew, Dr. Thomas Childs, at Phippsburg, Maine. At this place he died at the age of sixty-five, March 25, 1840. He was buried at Ellsworth.
