= Jane Sophia Appleton =

- Born: July 30, 1816; Bangor
- Died: March 30, 1884 (aged 67)
- Occupation: Writer, suffragist
- Spouse(s): Moses Lark Appleton

Jane Sophia Appleton (30 July 1816 – 30 March 1884) was an American writer, suffragist, and temperance activist. She is remembered for her 1848 utopian story "Sequel to the Vision of Bangor".

Jane Sophia Appleton was born on 30 July 1816 in Bangor, Maine, the daughter of Thomas A. Hill, a prominent lawyer, and Elizabeth Hill. She married Moses Lark Appleton, a lawyer and state legislator, in 1835, and they had three children.

Appleton was an early suffragist and active in the Woman's Christian Temperance Union. She published poems and essays on a variety of topics like female education. Along with Cornelia Crosby Barrett, she edited Voices from the Kenduskeag (1848), a collection of local stories and poems for the benefit of the Bangor Female Orphan Asylum. One of the works in the volume, "Vision of Bangor in the Twentieth Century" by Governor Edward Kent, is a mysoginist story about the future of women's suffrage, where nothing can be accomplished because women are too concerned about gossip and hairstyles. Appleton wrote a response to that story that is found later in the volume, "Sequel to the Vision of Bangor", which posits a successful future in 1978 where women enjoy equal rights and technological and societal advancements have significantly reduced domestic labor for women.

Jane Sophia Appleton died on 30 March 1884 in Bangor.
