= Online Biographical Dictionary of the Woman Suffrage Movement in the United States =

Open-access social-history database

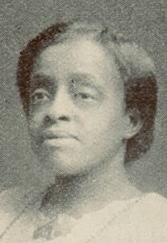
Roberta J. Dunbar, women's club leader and activist of Rhode Island, has an entry in the Online Biographical Dictionary; "most suffrage histories would not include someone like Dunbar."

The Online Biographical Dictionary of the Woman Suffrage Movement in the United States is a free-access resource of approximately 3,700 biographies of people associated with the campaign for a woman's right to vote in public elections in the United States. Published by the journal Women and Social Movements, hosted by Alexander Street, and edited by Thomas Dublin and Kathryn Kish Sklar, the biographies were created by volunteers.

The corpus focuses on suffragists from three main groups:

- Black suffragists affiliated with a variety of local and national organizations; "there is more to the story of Black women's suffrage activism than their exclusion from the ranks of white suffragists"
- National American Woman Suffrage Association suffragists, the mainstream group most commonly identified with the idea of suffrage work
- National Woman's Party suffragists, NWP being a more militant advocacy group

Suggested by historian Jill Zahniser and modeled, in part, on the work of Elizabeth Crawford on British suffragists, the project was started in 2015 with an eye toward completion by the 100th anniversary of the Nineteenth Amendment to the United States Constitution. The listings were drawn from a database of women arrested at a White House protest, African-American women who had published writing on the topic of suffrage, names unearthed through original research during the course of the first biographical investigations, and 2,700 names drawn from volume six of The History of Woman Suffrage (1922). The original goal circa 2017 of approximately 3,200 biographies was exceeded by 500 as of 2023.

Publication began in 2017 and was largely complete as of December 2022, with further supplements published roughly every six months. There are 72 (originally 99) outstanding names—dubbed the Impossibles—from the histories of women's suffrage in the United States that the researchers have not been able to conclusively identify.

As one Rhode Island historian and project state coordinator put it, "Dublin and Sklar designed the project as a work of social history, meaning that the entries would focus on the ordinary, and usually unknown, members of the movement, instead of celebrated leaders such as Susan B. Anthony, Elizabeth Cady Stanton, or Alice Paul." Volunteer contributors have included professors, teachers, school administrators, librarians, community members, local historians, high school students, undergrads, graduate students, and genealogists. Faculty at Rosemont in Pennsylvania included creation of biographies for the Dictionary as coursework: "Students in historical research methods were each assigned two suffragists with an option to take on a third biography. Honors students in the history of gender were assigned three biographies. One student participated in both courses and thus completed six biographies. Graduate student Katherine Pettine not only edited the biographies but completed six of her own." A high school class in Massachusetts, and faculty and undergraduate students from Rhode Island College were among the contributors of biographies for suffragists from the Ocean State. A University of Delaware academic and students "found additional black women suffragists in Wilmington" and those names and biographies were added to the database.

Comparison of the biographies of the three main groups of suffragists found that the NWP-affiliated activists were generally younger and newer to political work. Black activists were generally also involved in broader "racial uplift" projects and most had long histories of involvement with the black women's club movement. New York-based NAWSA members, overwhelmingly white, had an average of 16 years of political or community involvement.
