= Lydia Neal Dennett =

American abolitionist and suffragist (1798–1881)

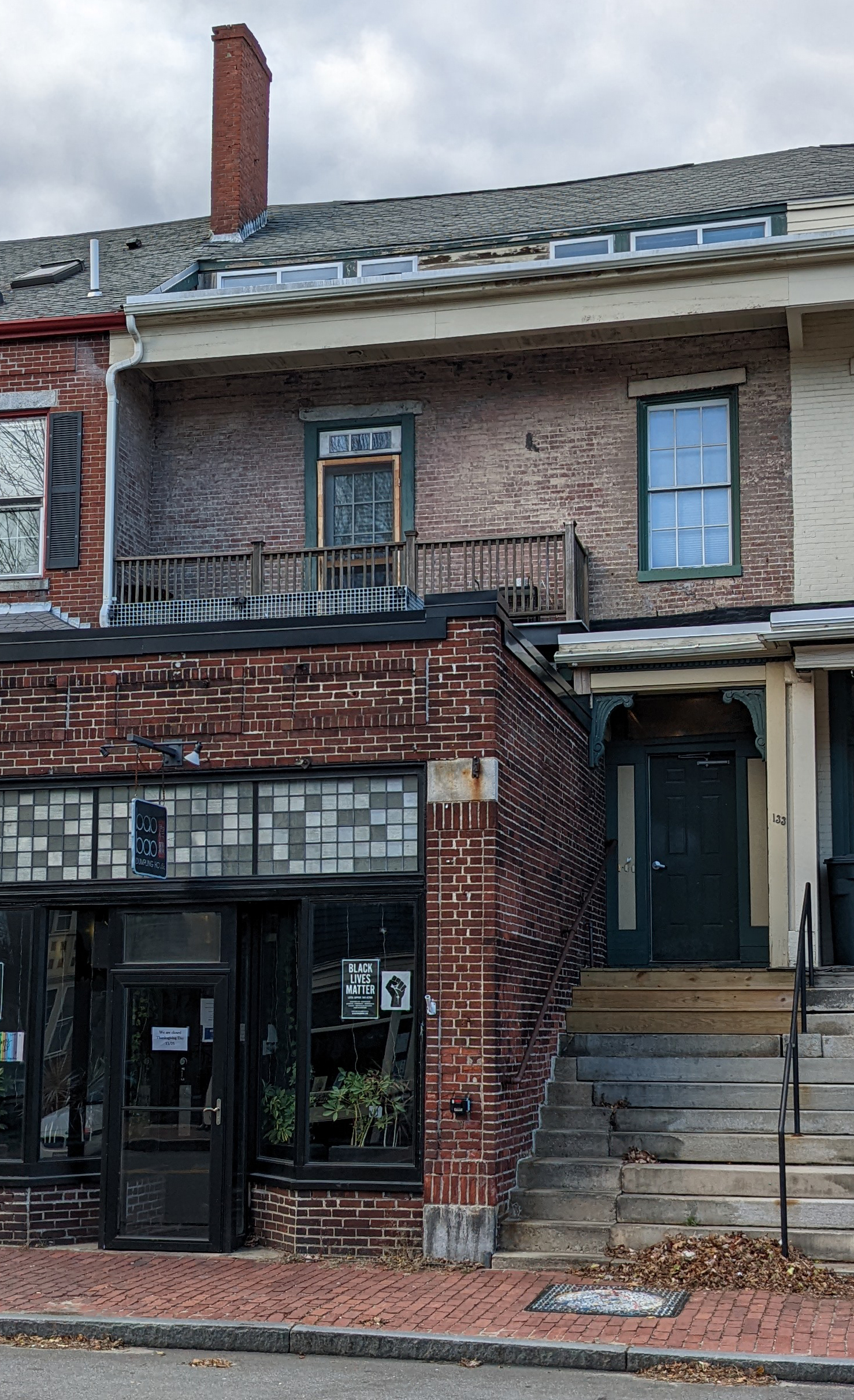
- Dennett home with later storefront addition
- Born: August 17, 1798; Eliot, Maine
- Died: June 4, 1881 (aged 82); Portland, Maine
- Resting place: Evergreen Cemetery
- Known for: Abolitionism; Suffrage activism
- Spouse: Oliver Dennett (m. 1822)

Lydia Louisa Neal Dennett (August 17, 1798 – June 4, 1881) was an abolitionist and suffragist from Portland, Maine. Her home was a station on the Underground Railroad and Dennett helped Ellen Craft escape to England. Later, Dennett became involved in women's suffrage, serving as vice president of the executive committee of the American Woman Suffrage Association and leading Maine's first petition campaign for this cause.

== Biography ==
Dennett was born in the town of Eliot in the Massachusetts District of Maine on August 17, 1798, and was the first cousin of John Neal. She was educated by Quakers. Dennett married Oliver Dennett in 1822 and moved to Portland, Maine. The Dennetts' home at 133 Spring Street was a station on the Underground Railroad. The couple kept a "closed carriage with a fine pair of horses" provided by the antislavery society to help aid escaped slaves reach safety.

Lydia Dennett and abolitionist, Elizabeth Widgery Thomas, intervened in an anti-slavery riot that broke out in 1840s at a Portland Female Anti-Slavery Society meeting. Dennett and Thomas helped lecturer, Stephen S. Foster, to safety during the riot. Dennett also helped Ellen Craft, an escaped slave, and her husband flee to England.

In 1852, Oliver Dennett died. Lydia Dennett continued her work, especially for women's rights. Dennett was on the executive committee of the American Woman Suffrage Association (AWSA) in 1869. The following year she served as vice president of the Woman's Suffrage Bazar [sic] in Boston. By 1872, Dennett was selected to serve as vice president of the AWSA's executive committee. That same year, she led the first petition campaign for women's suffrage in Maine, as well as Maine's first petition campaign for indigenous suffrage.

Lydia Dennett died on June 4, 1881, and was buried in Evergreen Cemetery in Portland.
