= Augusta Merrill Hunt =

American philanthropist, temperance leader (1842–1932)

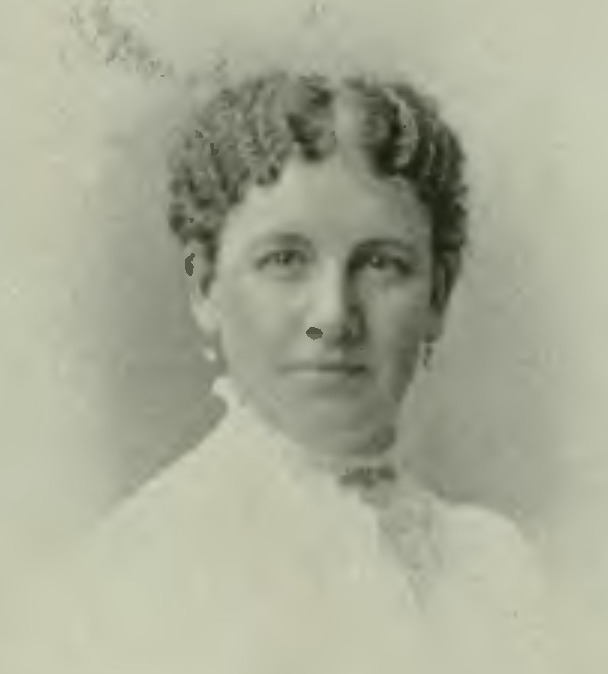
- Portrait from A Woman of the Century
- Born: Augusta Merrill Barstow; June 6, 1842; Portland, Maine, U.S.
- Died: June 15, 1932 (aged 90); Portland, Maine, U.S.
- Occupations: philanthropist; suffragist; temperance leader
- Organizations: Woman's Christian Temperance Union; Associated Charities
- Spouse: George S. Hunt (m. 1863; died 1896)
- Relatives: William Brewster (eighth in lineage); Helen Hunt (great-granddaughter)

Augusta Merrill Hunt (1842–1932) was an American philanthropist, suffragist, and temperance leader. She was identified with many of the prominent charitable organizations of Portland, Maine, notably that of the Portland Fraternity, the Associated Charities, the Home for Aged Women, the Maine Woman's Suffrage Association (M.W.S.A.), and the Woman's Christian Temperance Union (WCTU). She was the first president of the Portland branch of the WCTU.

== Early life and education ==
Augusta Merrill Barstow was born in Portland, Maine, June 6, 1842. She was the youngest daughter of George Simonton and Ellen (Merrill) Barstow, of Portland.

She received her education in the local schools and was a graduate of the Girls' High School.

== Career ==
In the spring of 1876, a public meeting was called in Portland, composed of two women delegates from each church in the city, to consider the feasibility of forming a local WCTU. Mrs. Hunt was present as one of the representatives from the First Universalist Church, and was called to preside over the meeting, and when, as its result, the WCTU was formed, the members called her to the position of president. Under her direction the coffee-house, diet kitchen, diet mission, and the Flower Mission were successfully organized and carried forward.

In 1878, the society became auxiliary to the National WCTU. Hunt continued as its president, retaining the office of president of the Portland WCTU for 15 years. Under her direction the Coffee House and Friendly Inn, the Flower and Diet Missions, Day Nursery, and Free Kindergartens were adopted as branches of the work of this organization; and the office of police matron was also established, Portland being the first city to recognize the importance of having a woman to care for women in unfortunate circumstances. In the National WCTU, Hunt was the superintendent of several departments. Hunt worked with Lillian M. N. Stevens in promoting WCTU work in Maine.

Three times, she held the position of national superintendent in the WCTU, the last department being that of higher education. In 1890, she resigned that position on account of ill health.

In 1884, she was chosen by the Governor of the State to co-operate with a Legislative Committee in the interests of the boys at the State Reform School. Here her tact and kindness, combined with a thorough knowledge of the school, made her advice and services valuable to the institution, and she was indirectly the means of bringing about some needed improvements. At the end of three years, she declined a re-appointment on account of the pressure of other duties.

On the death of her mother, Ellen Merrill Barstow, in 1873, Hunt succeeded her on the board of management of the Home for Aged Women, serving as director for 50 years. In 1889, she was unanimously elected president of that association, and held that role for 16 years.

She was a pioneer in the Maine's woman's suffrage movement, prominently connected with the M.W.S.A. and serving as its interim chair at the age of 74. She served as Maine superintendent of franchise of the WCTU. For 10 years, she was the president of the Portland Woman's Council, auxiliary to the National Council of Women of the United States, which consisted of 18 affiliated societies having a membership of several thousand. Under her leadership, the council was instrumental in having a law passed which gave to a mother an equal right with the father in the care and guardianship of minor children, and also a law which permitted the election of women to the school board. In 1916, she was the chair of Maine's Congressional Committee, a state-level division of National American Woman Suffrage Association.

For seven years, Hunt served as the president of the Ladies' History Club, the first literary society organized by the women of Portland, which was originated in 1874. She was one of the first women to have membership in the Maine Historical Society.

Hunt was well known at the State Capitol by her appeals to the Legislature for the establishment of the cottage system at the Reform School for Boys, also for addresses in the interest of a reformatory prison for women and in the cause of equal suffrage. Her presentation of these subjects was characterized as remarkable for foresight and sound reason. She also advocated for better laws for the protection of young girls.

She was interested in war work during World War I, and in the Women's War Council of the Young Women's Christian Association.

== Personal life ==
On September 22, 1863, she married George Smith Hunt (d. 1896), a merchant of Portland in the sugar refining business. They had two sons, Arthur and Philip.

In 1906, Hunt was elected to the Maine Society branch of the Mayflower Society, being eighth in lineage from William Brewster.

For many years, Hunt and two of her sisters, Mrs. Susan E. Bragdon and Mrs. Mary E. MacGregor, followed in the footsteps of their mother, being prominently identified with educational and philanthropic work. Mrs. Bragdon was the first president of the Woman's Literary Union and a worker in the Portland Fraternity. Mrs. McGregor was the founder and promoter of the Maine Home for Friendless Boys.

The actress Helen Hunt is Augusta's great-granddaughter.

In failing health for several months before her death, Augusta Merrill Hunt died in Portland, Maine, June 15, 1932 and is buried at Evergreen Cemetery in her hometown of Portland.
