= Ann F. Jarvis Greely =

American women's rights activist, abolitionist and business owner

Ann Frances Jarvis Greely (October 15, 1831- October 22, 1914) was a women's rights activist, abolitionist, business owner, and suffragist in Maine. Greely was one of the first women to own a business in Ellsworth, Maine (and in the state itself). She started a series of women's rights lectures in 1857, and was active in the women's suffrage movement in Maine. Greely helped support the Unitarian Church in Maine. In 1895, she was given the legal right to practice medicine.

== Biography ==
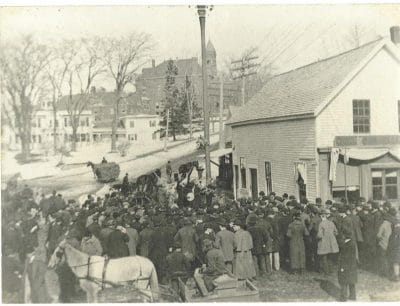
Ann F. Greely's store in 1893

Greely was born in Ellsworth, Maine on October 15, 1831. Greely attended private schools and Reverend Peter Nourse's school. Greely was likely influenced by Nourse to become a Unitarian Universalist. Greely was part of the First Unitarian Society in Ellsworth, founded in 1865. She was later involved in the building of a Unitarian Church in Ellsworth, which was opened in August o 1867.

Greely opened her own millinery store, named "Old Stand" in 1851. She was one of the first women to open her own business in Ellsworth and one of the first businesswomen in Maine. In 1853, she married Everard H. Greely, and Ann Greely continued to operate her own business.

Greely attended the Seneca Woman's Rights Convention in 1848. In 1857, Greely, her sister, Sarah Jarvis, and Charlotte Hill, created a committee that organized lectures on women's rights in Ellsworth. That March, Susan B. Anthony was one of their speakers and she gave a lecture to a crowded room at Whiting Hall. Greely was also an abolitionist and supported the temperance movement.

In 1873, Greely was at the organizing meeting of the Maine Woman Suffrage Association (MWSA). She was involved in writing and signing many different women's suffrage petitions to the Maine Legislature. She also likely wrote opinion columns under the pen name, "Qui Est."

Greely also earned a special certificate to practice medicine in 1895. However, she never "engaged in general practice." She did act as a nurse to friends, family, and animals. She died on October 22, 1914.
