= Hannah Johnston Bailey =

American Quaker teacher, activist, and advocate

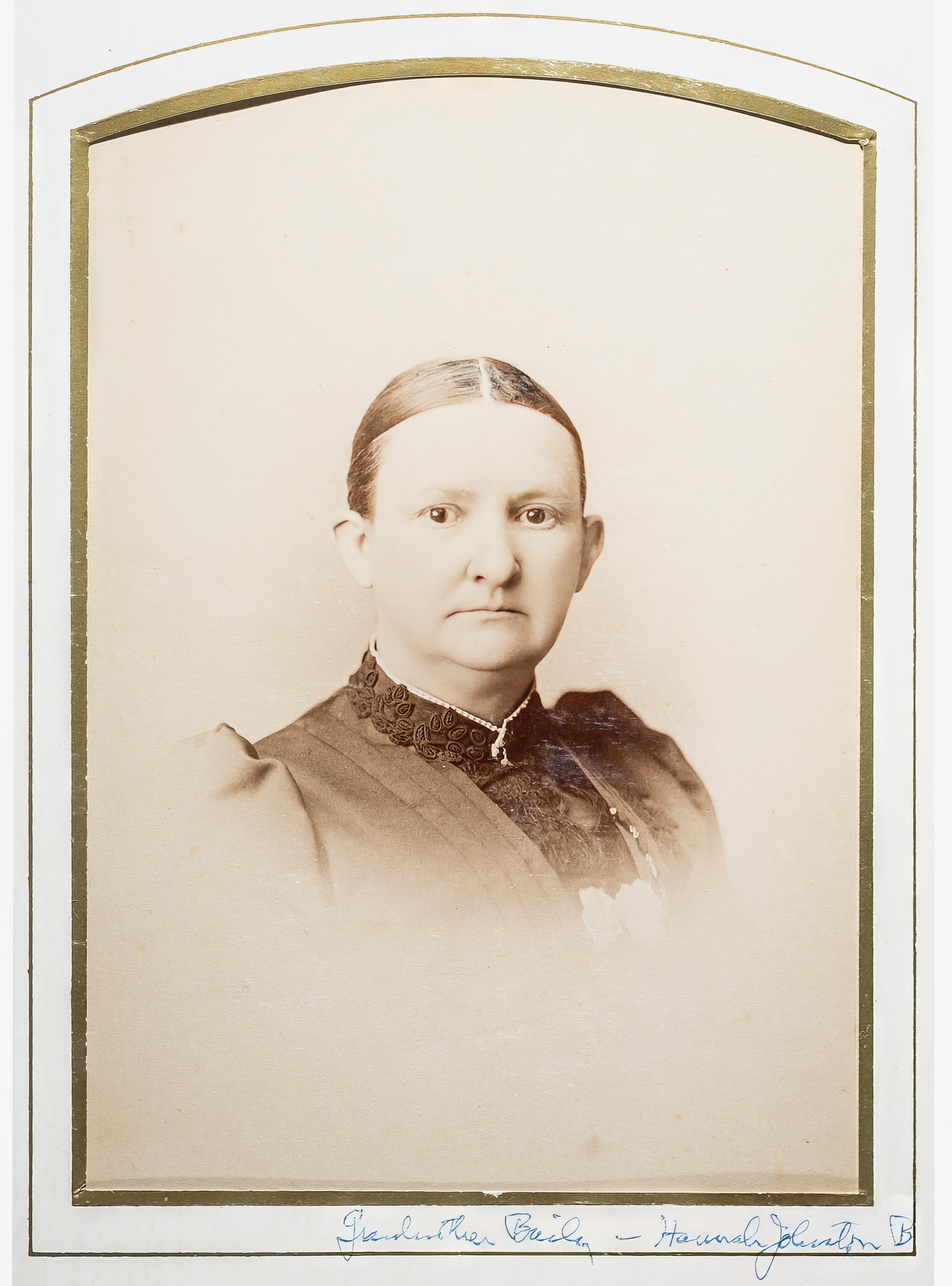
- Cabinet card photo, c. 1897
- Born: Hannah Clark Johnston; July 5, 1839; Cornwall, New York
- Died: October 23, 1923 (aged 84); Portland, Maine
- Occupation: Teacher
- Political party: Women's Christian Temperance Union; Woman's Peace Party
- Spouse: Moses Bailey (m. 1868; died 1882)
- Children: 1

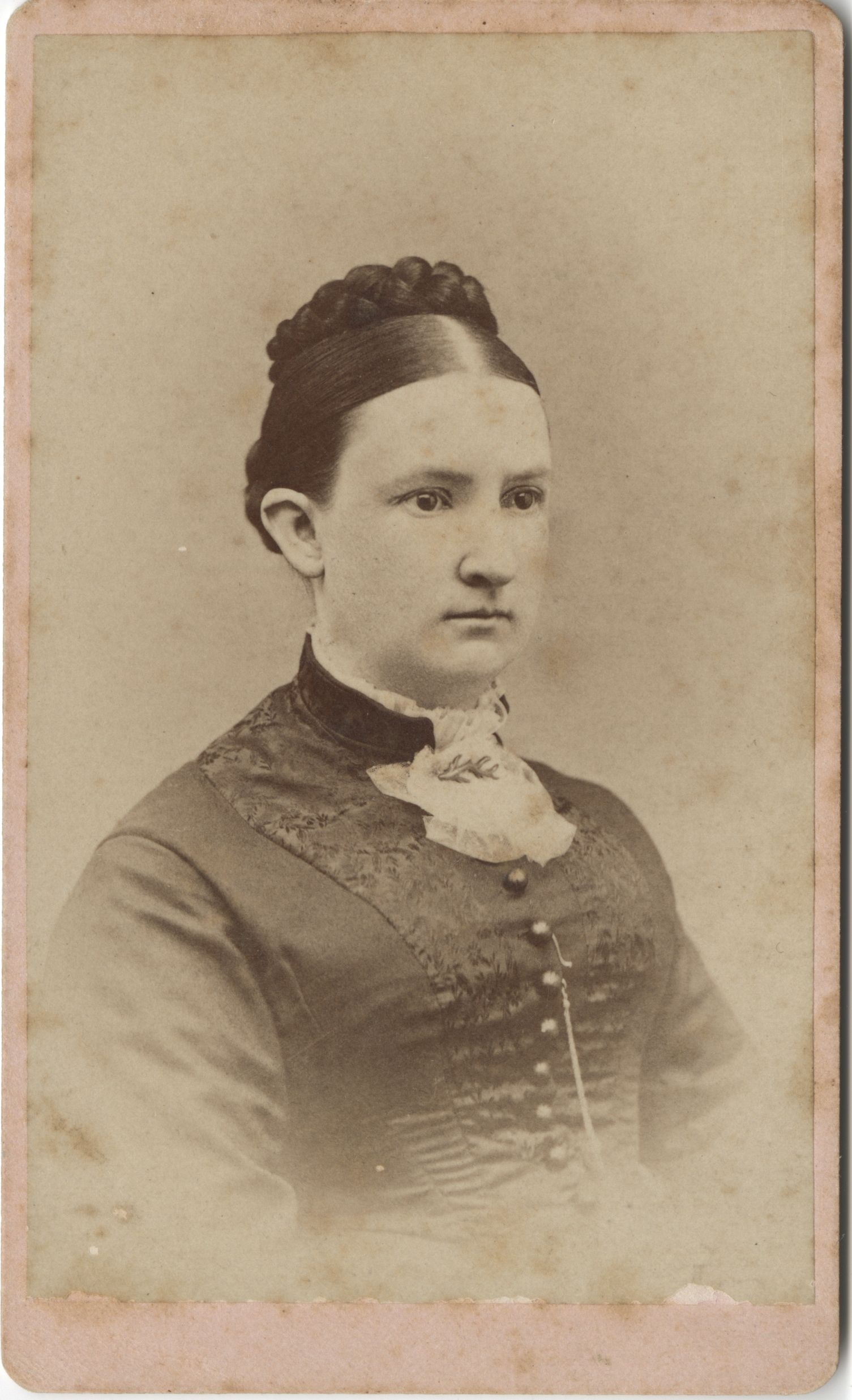
Photograph of Hannah Johnston Bailey (1884) [likely taken ca. 1869]

Hannah Johnston Bailey (July 5, 1839 – October 23, 1923) was an American Quaker teacher, pacifist, activist, and advocate for peace, temperance, and women's suffrage.

== Personal life ==
Hannah Clark Johnston was born in Cornwall, New York, in the Hudson Valley, the eldest child of David Johnston and Letitia Clark Johnston. Her parents were both Quakers, and her father was a tanner and a farmer as well as a minister. David Johnston moved the family to Plattekill, New York in 1854 for health reasons (likely caused by operating the tanning business) where they operated a commercial fruit farm and raised livestock. She was the eldest of eleven children. Although they were Quakers, two of her younger brothers (Francis (Frank) Clark Johnston who fought with Merrill's Horse and Joseph Hoag Johnston who fought with the 124th New York Infantry Regiment known as the "Orange Blossoms") enlisted and fought in the American Civil War. This reflected the mixed responses of the Quaker community to the war, with some feeling that in order to end slavery the war was a necessary evil. While Frank survived, Joseph was wounded on 5 May 1864 at the Battle of the Wilderness and subsequently spent three weeks in Rebel captivity before being rescued by Union cavalry and transported to Armory Square Hospital in Washington D.C. Hannah spent much of the summer and fall caring for Joseph at the hospital, and then in November had him transported to their home in Plattekill where he died on November 17, 1864.

The excerpts and letters below give a personal sense of H.J.B. during the war:

… Our beloved Country has called your services to aid your fellow Countrymen in putting down rebellion and slavery and instituting freedom and peace in a permanent reign over a land which has been so long noted for its freedom. May God help me calmly and feelingly to make the sacrifice and help you bravely to defend your Country's good. …

(Excerpt, Hannah C. Johnston to Frank C. Johnston 1 October 1861.)

…. God only knows what would become of me if you should ever persist in taking a part in this unholy war. I think my cup is now full enough of trouble by being compelled to be so separated from one dear brother, but if you should go, O my pen refuses to portray any emotions at the thought and I will not try. ….

(Excerpt, Hannah C. Johnston to Joseph H. Johnston, 7 January 1862.)

Home May 15, 1864

“Dear Josey,

Again I resume my pen ink and paper for the purpose of writing a letter to you my dear long absent brother. We are exceedingly anxious about you for we know that the battle before Richmond is now raging and that your regiment is engaged for we see the papers nearly every day. We anxiously read the lists of the killed and wounded and I saw the name of a Joseph Johnson among the wounded of Company E, and did not tell what regiment so we think it may be some other man and not you for there were was one of your regiment in the list of the killed and one in the list of wounded O how much we shall have to be thankful for if you are brought safely through this terrible campaign or even if you escape with your life we will give God the glory. I am glad the news in regard to victory is an encouraging as it seems to be.

O yes I rejoice in hopes that this cruel war will soon be over and rebellion be soon put down in our beloved Country. We derive much comfort in reading of the good work which the Sanitary and other Christian Commissions are doing among the dear wounded braves in the late battles. O verily the suffering are not forsaken. I wish I were there too to render help and comfort to them. O the sympathy I feel for the great and holy cause.

There are some news to tell you at this time. Our friend David Sutton died very suddenly about a week ago. If nothing serious prevents me I expect to go to New York next week probably on thursday [sic] and will stay about two weeks I expect to attend yearly meeting the first week.

I will now tell you what we are all doing at home, or rather what we have been doing.

Father has bought sixty five apple trees and sat out a young orchard on the North side and next to the orchard behind the house where he has berries. Some of our antwerps look nice but the most of them were killed with the drouth [sic] and early frost last year, so that we will have but very few this year, but father thinks they will bring a higher price for every body’s seem to be affected thus throughout the Country, and they say there will be more than ever next year for it.

Your peach orchard is just as full of blossoms as it can be and we have twenty seven cherry trees almost white with blossoms, and all our apple trees are very full. We have over an Acre of Strawberries set out and the blackberries look fine. The pear trees are also in full bloom.

The garden is planted and the potatoes and some of the corn. Now my dear brother I must tell you about my own department of agriculture. Father got me some nice flowers at the nursery, and bought two beautiful evergreen fir trees which I have put in the door yard and I have got twenty eight dahlias set out and twelve flower beds made in the door yard and everything is growing finely.

I will now tell you about our poultry department. Mother has got about thirty chickens and two turkeys sitting on thirty eggs. Tommy owns a gobbler and ten little ducks. I own one old hen and one duck and one chicken, and a hen is sitting on five geese eggs for me. I have two fine heifers growing which will be cows next year, and I have a barrel of apples promised me which are growing on the trees. I have also got a cat, so you see I can stock quite a farm.

Hannah C. Johnston

Washington D.C. June 9, 1864

Dear Father & Mother

This has been an intensely warm day in consequence of which Josey has not felt so well and was more weak and feverish than usual. However the doctor says there is nothing to prevent him from getting well. except if he only keeps his courage up and dont [sic] give up to thinking himself worse that he really is, - he says a great many die in the hospital for that very reason. They wish me to be as lively as possible around him on that account. One man sobs and cries like a child when he looks at his wound and I expect he will die of despair although the severity of his it is mere nothing compared with Josey’s, but Josey is very cheerful.

I felt much discouraged myself the day before yesterday for a large bone tried to force itself through the skin and flesh which caused him much suffering. The pain was so intense sometimes that it caused him to turn deathly pale and his eyes looked glassy. He was much better yesterday however, particularly in the forenoon, but was not so well today. The doctor says the bones have begun to knit together and the wound is healing and all they need is time to get right. A place has broken out near the wound which discharges much corruption that smells dreadfully but the doctor says it is a good thing for it to be so. He probed the wound to get the loose bone out but found it would not do because it is so large. Josey says he wishes it was out for he dont [sic] believe it is any relation to him and has got out of its place entirely by being in his leg. He wanted to have his leg operated on but the doctor says he will not do that for he dont [sic] want to kill him.

I will now tell you something which you have not known before and which I hope will make you feel thankful to Almighty God for mercies received. Josey was wounded on the fifth of May and a few days after he was taken prisoner by the rebels with several other wounded and sick men. It was guerrillas that took them and as they had no means of moving them they were left near the Wilderness and guarded. Our army sent for them with wagons and a flag of truce but the rebels took the wagons from them. finally after three weeks of terrible suffering and having to let the sick take care of the wounded an army of our Cavalry went there and drove the rebels away and rescued the poor sufferers. Josey was then immediately sent to Washington which where he could have come at first he might have been well enough to have gone home with me. He says he has suffered equal to a great many deaths and he thinks he would have died if the thoughts of his dear friends at home had not caused him to try to live.

If he is smart enough for me to leave I will probably come home in about two weeks. His paymaster brought him two months pay (twenty six dollars) to day and he gave it to me to use. I will probably bring the most of it home. It cost me nine dollars to come here from Newburg and my board will be five dollars per week. I am at a first class private boarding house. The Hotels ask three dollars per day. The other boarders here are paying thirty dollars a month but they favor me on Josey’s account.

Everything here is very high and we have very rich food in great variety. We breakfast at eight, lunch at one and dine at five o clock. I go to the hospital after breakfast and return at 5 o clock dinner after which I do not go back. I can ride from the house to the hospital without walking any. I walked on morning but it tired me so that Josey wishes one to ride hereafter. It is more tiresome on account of the heat. I will now close and go to bed for I am very tired. Please write to me often.

Hannah C. Johnston

This direct experience of the consequences of war cemented for Hannah Johnston a commitment to peace.

Following the war Hannah involved herself in teaching and setting up Sabbath Day schools in Ulster County. Then, in 1867, she embarked on a six month Quaker mission with Quaker minister Hannah S. Fry, traveling over 2,300 miles between Nantucket Island and the Canadian border with Maine visiting and preaching at Quaker meetings, churches, prisons, and alms houses. Toward the end of this mission, while visiting the Winthrop, Maine area, she met the prominent Quaker businessman Moses Bailey. Bailey, along with his brother Charles Martin Bailey, owned and operated a successful oilcloth manufacturing enterprise. Moses' first wife, Betsey Jones, had passed away after long illness in March of that year, and the widower was seeking companionship to ease his bereavement. The two women stayed at Moses' home while preaching in the area, and then Moses joined them for several weeks while they finished their mission journey.

The following year Hannah Johnston married Moses Bailey and moved to Winthrop which was her home for the rest of her life. In 1869 they had a son, Moses Melvin Bailey, and three years later a daughter was born who died at birth. Hannah spent the next ten years raising her son and helping her husband run and expand the business as Moses' health gradually failed. When Moses died in 1882 Hannah took over the business operations which now included a retail outlet in Portland, Maine and a factory in Camden, New Jersey.

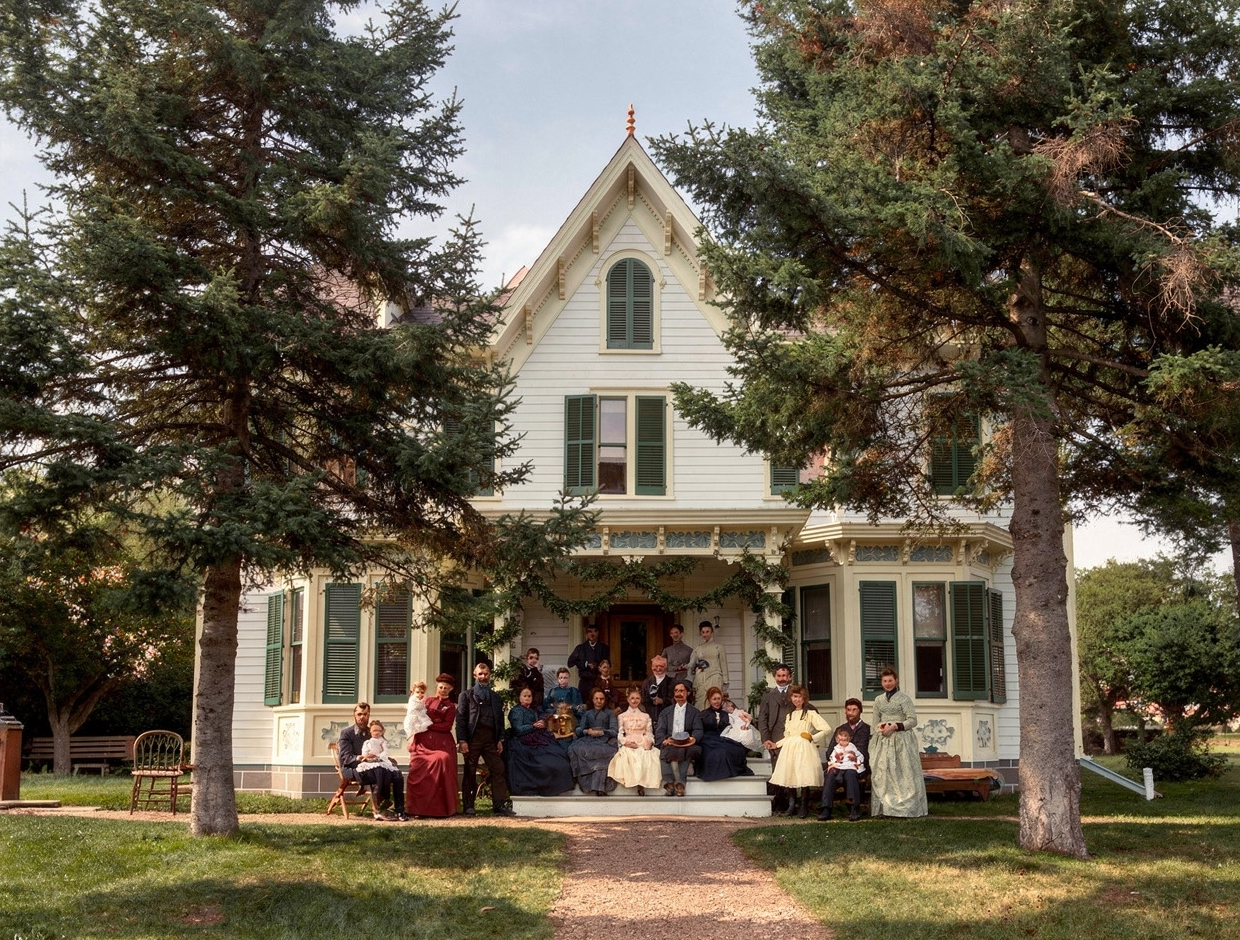
Home built by Hannah J. Bailey for her parents in Plattekill, N.Y. Photo from August 1888, 50th wedding anniversary of David and Letitia Johnston

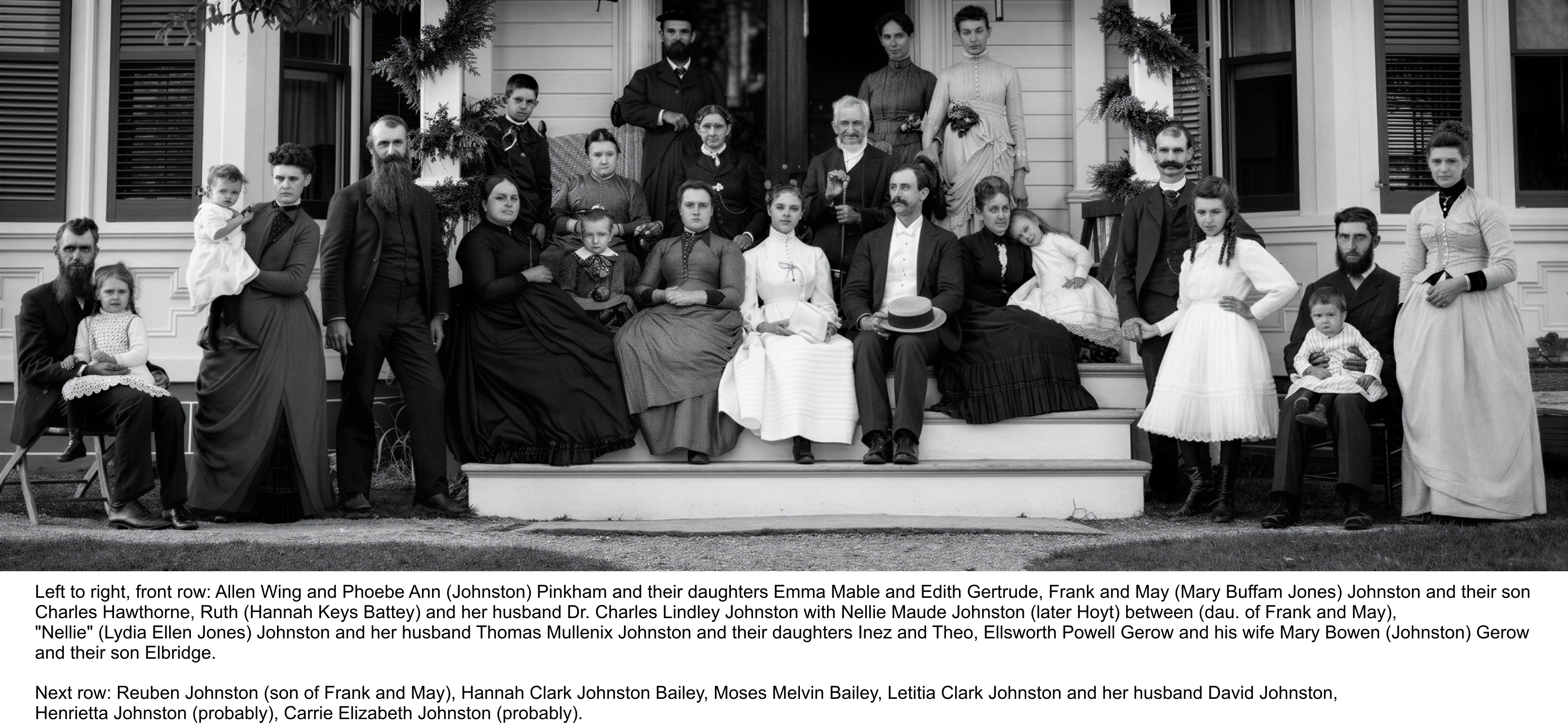
Photograph of Hannah J. Bailey's family at her parents home in Plattekill, N.Y.

Hannah made three trips abroad, the first in 1884 to Europe with two of her siblings, Charles and Henrietta, the second in 1896 with her niece Theo Edna Johnston to Italy, Egypt, and Palestine where she visited the Ramallah Friends School in Ramallah, and the third in 1900 with her son to Scotland and Scandinavia. The Friends School in Palestine was founded by Eli and Sybil Jones of China, Maine in the 1860s. Hannah's sister Henrietta taught English there starting in 1889, and her grandson, Moses Melvin Bailey Jr. served as headmaster for the school for several years beginning in 1919.

She built a summer house she called the "Pine Cliff Chalet" on Belle Isle in Cobbosseecontee Lake in the late 1890s where she often entertained guests, friends, and family during the last decades of her life. Visitors included Rufus Jones (writer) and family; Palestinian Khalil Totah, A. Edward Kelsey, Rosa A. Lee and others associated with the Ramallah Friends School, and various international guests. Many who signed her guest books referred to her as "Aunt Hannah" and left affectionate comments regarding their visits.

Hannah died at her son's house in Portland on October 23, 1923. She is buried at Lakeview Cemetery in Winthrop, Maine.

Her home in Winthrop Center, Maine, the Moses Bailey House, is on the National Register of Historic Places.

Her papers are archived in the Swarthmore College Peace Collection.

== Career ==
Bailey taught school in Plattekill, New York from 1858 to 1867. She ran her late husband's businesses, a factory producing oilcloth and a carpet store, from 1882 until 1889, and 1891, respectively.

In 1883, she joined the Women's Christian Temperance Union (WCTU), and worked with Lillian M. N. Stevens to establish a reformatory for women in Maine. She represented Maine at the National Conference of Charities and Correction. In 1887, she became head of the WCTU's new Department of Peace and Arbitration, and through the organization worked to oppose war and violence in all forms, including capital punishment, lynching, prizefighting, military conscription, even toy soldiers and military drills in schools. In 1898 she was elected president of the Woman's Temperance Publishing Association, the publishing arm of the WCTU, succeeding Matilda Carse. She also served as business manager.

She was editor and publisher of two WCTU peace periodicals, Pacific Banner and Acorn (intended for young readers), from her home in Winthrop, Maine. [issues of these publications are available online through the Swarthmore Peace Collection archive] She retired from her WCTU posts in 1916, as World War I began and the WCTU endorsed American involvement.

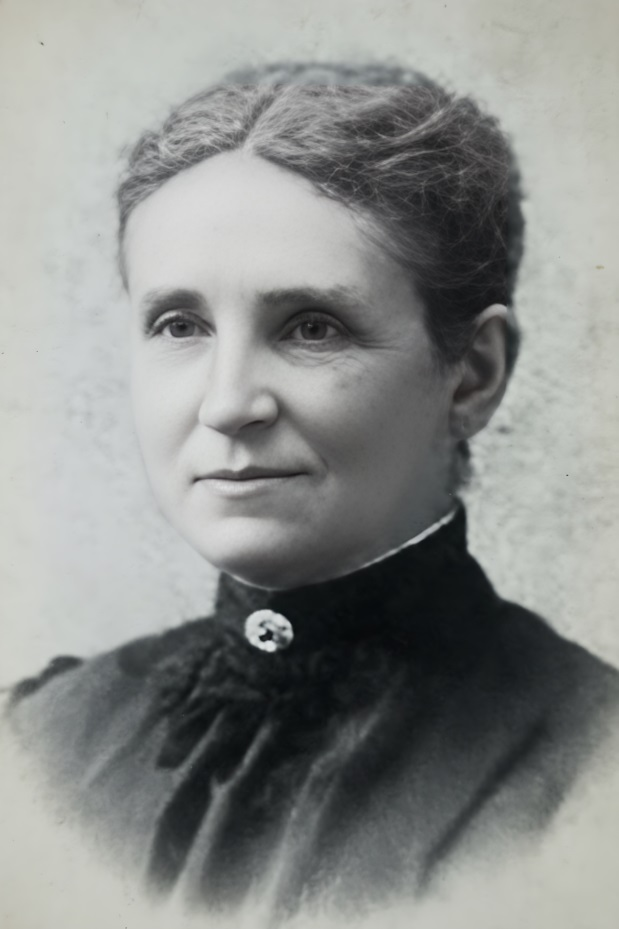
Hannah Johnston Bailey (1895)

From 1891 to 1899, she was president of the Maine Woman Suffrage Association, and from 1895 to 1899 she served as treasurer of the National Council of Women. She was also a member of the National American Women's Suffrage Association (NAWSA). In 1915 she joined the Woman's Peace Party, and was a member of the Women's International League for Peace and Freedom at the end of her life.

Her many other reform interests included the influence of militarism on children, reform of women's prisons, the abolition of capital punishment, and women's missionary work. Bailey also served as an officer of the Universal Peace Union.

Her work for women's suffrage spanned more than four decades. She was a member of the Maine Women Suffrage Association (MWSA) along with Lillian M.N. Stevens of Portland, an organization founded in 1873 by John Neal, a Portland lawyer (see "Women's suffrage in Maine). By the late 1880s it had become somewhat moribund, and Hannah and her colleagues believed that an organization devoted to the cause of Women's suffrage should necessarily be run by women. Hannah ran for president of the organization in 1891 and served in this role until 1897. In 1896 she gave an annual address to the organization summarized here by Edward Schriver for the July 1980 issue of "Maine Life" titled "Hannah Bailey Fought For Women's Vote":

"The opening words of her speech were cutting: "Beloved comrades in the battle for victory..." This kindly appearing Quaker woman showed the fire in her soul as she continued her address to her fellow fighters, all seventy of them, "...the government founded on the (Maine) constitution of 1820 still remains intact and only 'every adult male citizen not a pauper or criminal, who has resided in the state three months, is entitled to vote at elections.' " Every time a bill with the petitions had been received by the Maine Legislature's Judiciary Committee and a hearing had been granted representatives of the "suppliants", these people in government had been kind and courteous to listen. But they have failed to give us the vote!

The eloquence of Mrs. Bailey surfaced later in her address. She did not voice new ideas or her own thoughts necessarily when she spoke; but it is obvious to the reader from a distance in time of eight-five years, that she spoke from the heart. "The 'human question' ", she intoned, "lies at the foundation of the 'woman question'. The uplifting of the race is the divine problem for whose solution Christ gave the Golden Rule....Whether suffrage be a right or a privilege, if it is of value to one-half of mankind, it is of value to all." She lamented as well the hurt of being without the opportunity to vote. "It is humiliating to be disfranchised or unfranchised. When the government wished to punish Jefferson Davis it considered that the worst punishment it could inflict upon him was to deprive him of the right to vote."

NEAR THE COMPLETION of her speech, she laid out the crux of their demands: "Women have equal interest in the laws with men; they have to obey them just the same, and pay the same penalties for breaking them. Their stake in the home is at least as large as that of men; in the conditions of labor it is growing larger every year, and in all that touches the welfare of society as a whole they are concerned equally with men....Governments derived their just powers from the consent of the governed. Women are governed. 'Taxation without representation is tyranny' ". She concluded with words of hope: "May the time come apace when woman shall be no more weak politically, but when she will be elevated to the highest sphere of her own possibilities. Then she will elevate the unborn generations, both men and women, her own posterity, to a place beside herself in the scale of human heights."

Hannah J. Bailey was sixty-one years old in 1900 and still the vote was not hers. She and her colleagues around the state and nation continued as before to plug onward. The road to the franchise was necessarily a long one. In Maine, though more Republicans than Democrats proportionally were for them, the Legislature stood fast with its "No.""

It took nearly a quarter century from the date of this speech until the Anthony Amendment was ratified in 1920.

She was a well known and respected figure among her contemporaries as attested by this biographical sketch published in 1900 in the National Cyclopaedia of American Biography:

BAILEY, Hannah J., philanthropist, was born at Cornwall-on-the-Hudson, July 5, 1889, the first of eight[sic] children of David Johnston, a minister in the Friends' church, and his wife, Letitia (Clark) Johnston. On the maternal side her ancestry has been traced back to Samuel Clark, of whom, in a publication of 1897 of the history and genealogy of the Clark family, the author says: “I find that the probabilities are very strong that Samuel Clark, Sr., came from England in 1630, in the year Gov. Winthrop, Rev. Richard Denton, Thomas Wicks and over a thousand others came to America. With the two last named he was closely associated at Stamford, Conn.

Being a birthright member of the Friends' church, which from its beginning has been strong in its principles regarding peace and arbitration, Mrs. Bailey is well adapted to interest others in this subject, which has claimed much of her time and attention during many years. For her labor in this field she Is best known in her own and foreign lands, although she has also been interested and active in helping promote other reforms.

She was educated at a Friends' boarding school in New York State. She taught school nine years, after which she became the wife of Moses Bailey, a well-known oilcloth manufacturer, of Winthrop, Me., where she has ever since resided. Mrs. Bailey has shown rare executive ability, having conducted, for several years after the death of her husband, in 1882, his extensive business affairs.

She has held satisfactorily many important offices in different benevolent societies and those which have hail reform for their object. In 1891 Mrs. Bailey became president of the Maine Woman's Equal Suffrage Association, and held the position six years. She was then released at her own request. She was one of the judges in the department of liberal arts at the World s Fair in Chicago in 1893, having been appointed by the board of lady managers. In Washington, in 1895, she was elected treasurer of the National Council of Women for three years. Similar positions she has held for many years at a time in the work of her church.

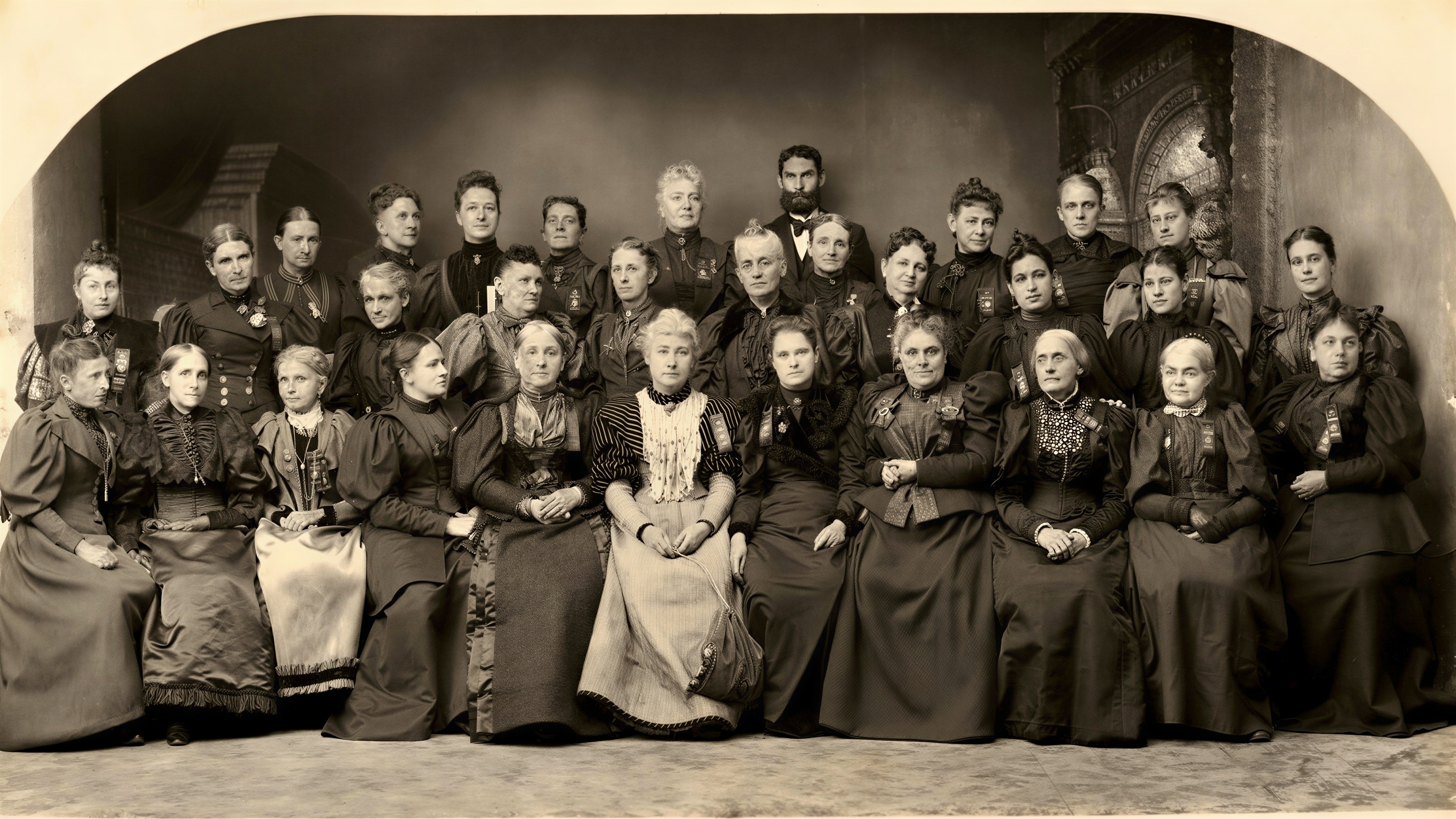
Group photo of officers and patrons of the National Council of Women including Hannah J. Bailey, Susan B. Anthony, May Wright Sewall, and others.

Twice she has received appointment by two different governors of her state to represent Maine on the national board of charities and corrections. Space prevents our mention of the many ways, both at home and abroad, in which she has labored zealously and untiringly to cause the name of Christ and his Gospel to be known in the earth, but it has been through her connection with the W. C. T. U. In promoting the interests of her own department of peace and international arbitration that Mrs. Bailey has become best known. The work accomplished has been, and is, mainly of an educational character. Peace bands are formed among children, clergymen are invited to preach in the interests of the cause, and petitions arc circulated. To this work Mrs. Bailey was appointed in 1887 when the department was first adopted by the National, and in 1888 by the World Woman's Christian Temperance Union. As a result of Mrs. Bailey's persistent efforts, and those of her helpers, the peace department has been organized in twenty-six states and in New Mexico territory. It is found now organized in several countries, and there are many lands in which effectual work is being done unofficially. The department has in some way taken part in all the world's peace congresses held since its organization. It has published much literature, among which are two official papers— one for adults and one for children. The department, in connection with other peace societies of the world, observes the third Sabbath of December each year as Peace Sunday. Able lecturers are busy a great deal of the time, and Mrs. Bailey herself has traveled extensively in Europe, Asia, Africa and the United States, promoting its interests.

Bailey wrote a biography of her late husband, Reminiscences of a Christian Life (1885).

== Selected works ==
- Reminiscences of a Christian Life (1885)
