= Elizabeth Glendower Evans =

America social reformer (1856–1937)

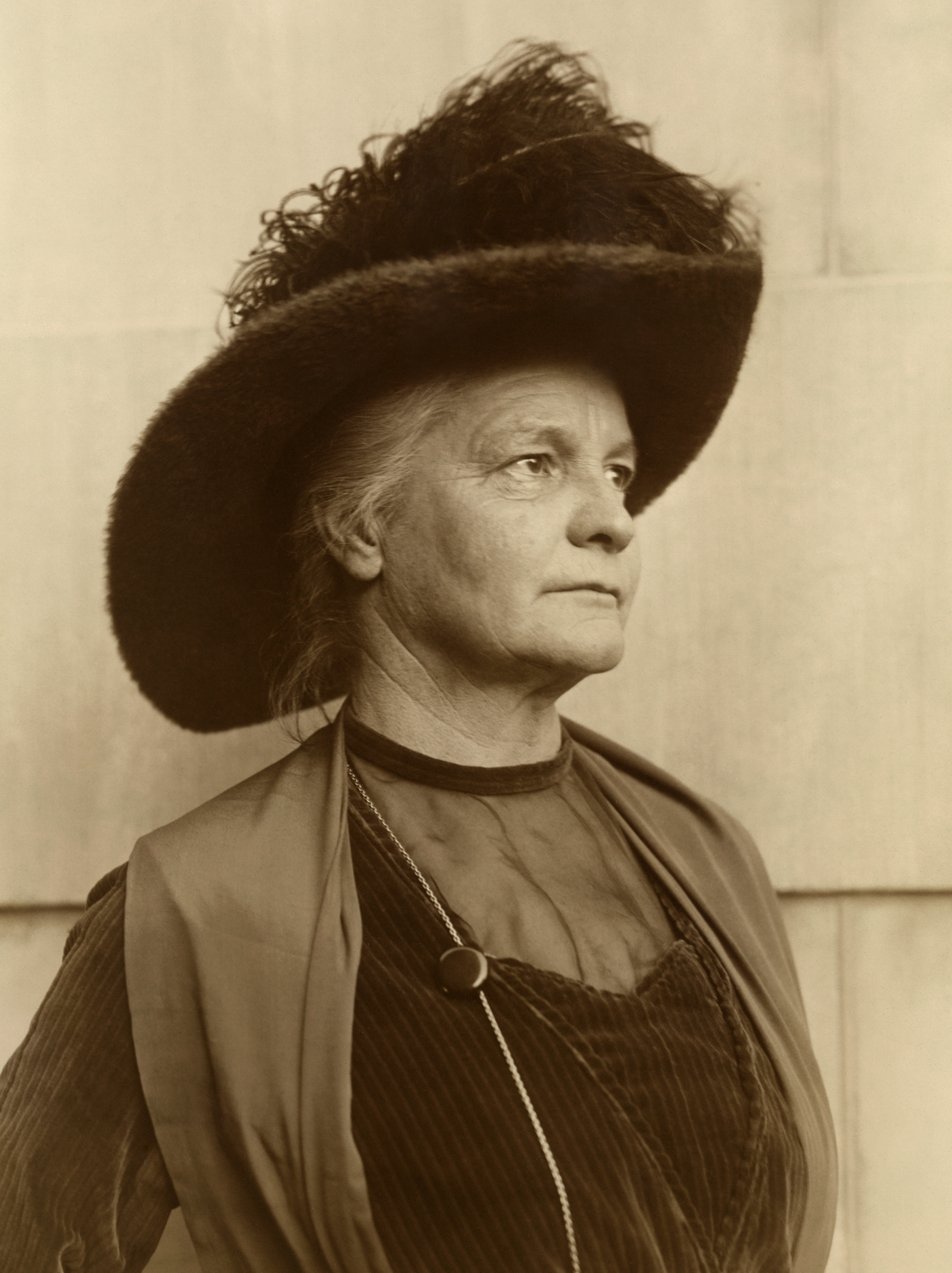
- Evans in 1914
- Born: Elizabeth Gardiner; February 28, 1856; New Rochelle, New York, U.S.
- Died: December 12, 1937 (aged 81); Brookline, Massachusetts, U.S.
- Occupations: Social reformer; suffragist
- Spouse: Glen Glendower Evans (m. 1882; died 1886)

Elizabeth Glendower Evans (February 28, 1856 – December 12, 1937) was an American social reformer and suffragist.

== Life ==
Evans née Gardiner was born on February 28, 1856, in New Rochelle, New York. She inherited a significant amount of money when she turned 26 in 1882. The same year she married Glendower Evans who died four years later, in 1886.

Evans traveled to England in 1908. There she became involved in understanding the issues of industrialized society including hazardous working conditions and unemployment. There she was introduced to socialism.

When Evans returned to the United States she took up the cause of women's suffrage and the associated problems of tenements and factory work arising from disenfranchisement.

Evans pursued social reform, serving in a variety of positions. She was a trustee of the Massachusetts State Reform Schools from 1886 through 1914. She was a member of the Women's Educational and Industrial Union of Boston as well as the Boston Women's Trade Union League, the Massachusetts Minimum Wage Commission, and the Massachusetts Consumers' League. In 1915 Evans served as a delegate to the International Congress of Women at the Hague. She was the first National Organizer of the Woman's Peace Party. From 1920 until 1937 she served as a national director of the American Civil Liberties Union.

Evans died on December 12, 1937, in Brookline, Massachusetts.

== Legacy ==
Evans papers are housed at the Schlesinger Library in Cambridge, Massachusetts.

== See also ==
- List of suffragists and suffragettes
