= Florence Brooks Whitehouse =

American novelist

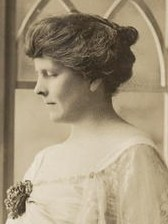
- Florence B. Whitehouse, from a 1902 publication
- Born: October 29, 1869; Augusta, Maine
- Died: 1945 (aged 75–76)
- Occupation(s): Suffragist, novelist
- Spouse: Robert Treat Whitehouse (m. 1894)

Florence Brooks Whitehouse (October 29, 1869 – 1945) was an American suffragist, activist and novelist from Maine. In 2008, Whitehouse was inducted to the Maine Women's Hall of Fame. She was an early feminist who was considered radical for her support of Alice Paul and the tactics of the National Woman's Party.

== Early life and marriage ==
She was born into a wealthy and prominent family in Augusta, Maine and attended Augusta Public Schools and St. Catherine's Hall boarding school, affiliated with the Episcopal church. In 1892-93, Whitehouse traveled to Southern Europe and the Middle East. In 1894, she married Robert Treat Whitehouse, a lawyer from Augusta and the couple moved to Portland, Maine. She and Robert wrote, directed, and acted in several plays before their first child (William Penn) arrived in 1896. Robert Treat, Jr. was born in 1898 and Brooks in 1904. She wrote two romance novels based in the Middle East; The God of Things (1902) and The Effendi (1904), which were both published by Little, Brown and Company. She illustrated her first book herself, but the second one was illustrated by I.H. Caliga.

== Suffragist ==
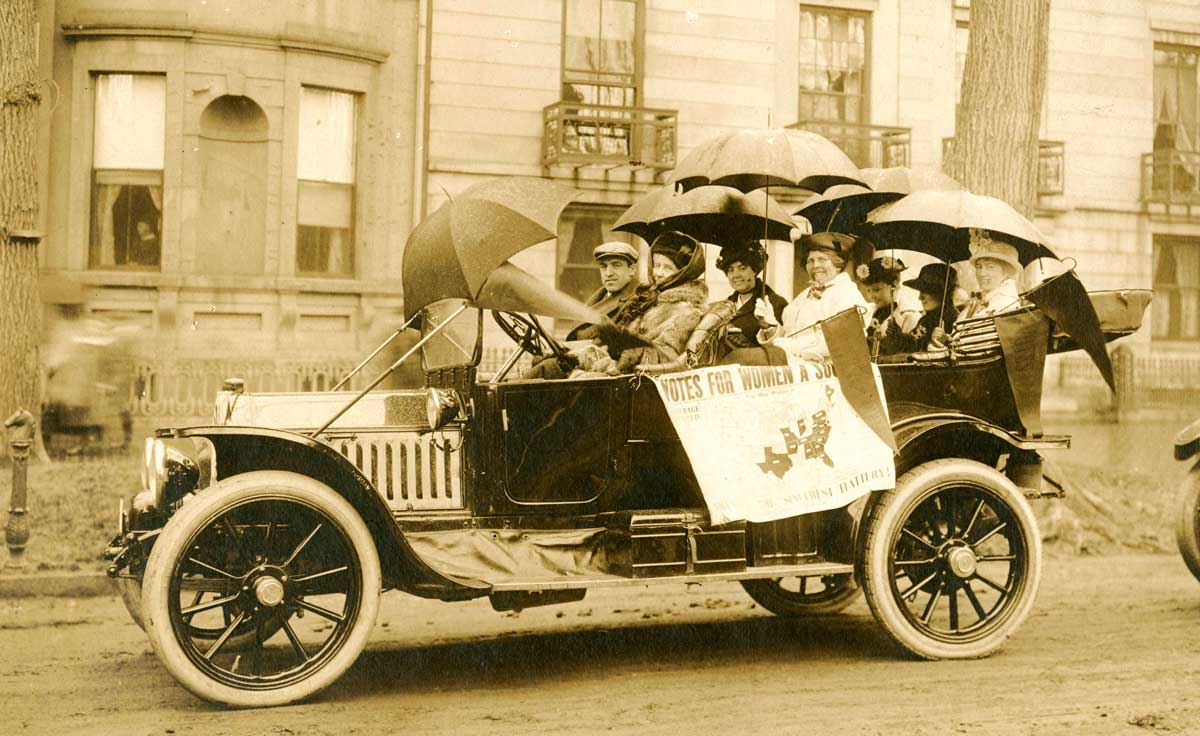
Florence Brooks Whitehouse driving with suffragists in Portland, Maine in 1914

She became active in the suffrage movement in 1913. She initially joined the Maine Woman Suffrage Association (MWSA) which was affiliated with the National American Woman Suffrage Association (NAWSA). In 1915 she helped launch the Maine branch of the National Woman's Party (NWP), and was asked to serve as its chairman, a role she played for at least the next 13 years. She also served for a time on the NWP's national Advisory Committee. In the service of the NWP she picketed President Woodrow Wilson, and organized Wyoming voters to vote against Wilson in his 1916 re-election campaign. She was the NWP's most active and vocal supporter in Maine, and her allegiance earned her the enmity of her former colleagues in MWSA, who considered it too radical. MWSA eventually forced Maine suffragists to choose between their organization and the NWP; Florence chose the latter.

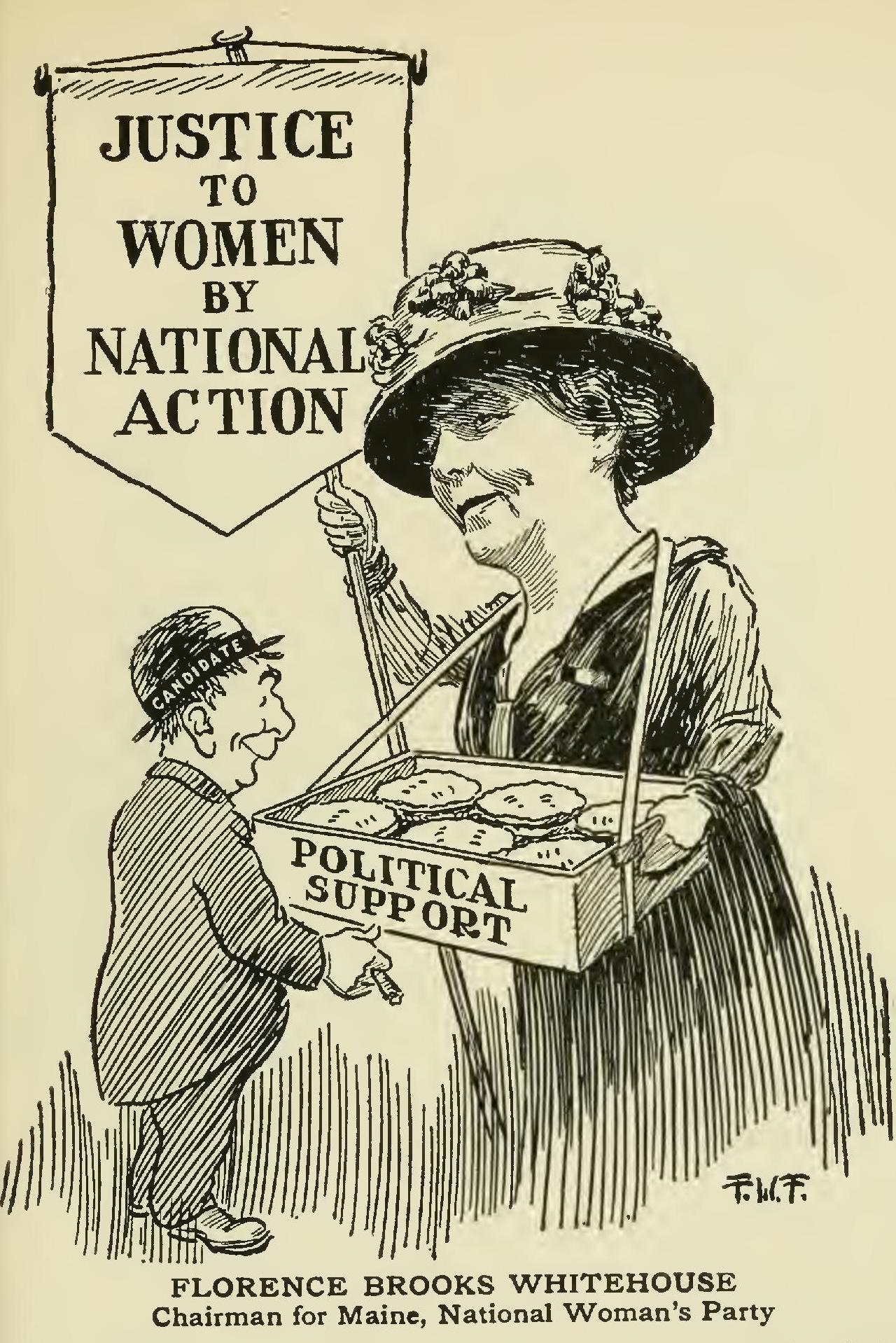
Florence Brooks Whitehouse, Chairman for Maine, National Woman’s Party slogan- “JUSTICE TO WOMEN BY NATIONAL ACTION” in 1918 book, Mother Goose Comes to Portland

In 1918-19, she led the effort in Maine to put pressure on United States Senator Frederick Hale to vote in favor of the federal amendment that would enfranchise women. Eventually the federal amendment was approved by the US House, and there were only a handful of votes needed to get it through the Senate. Hale was on the short list of Senators who might be persuaded to support the amendment, and Florence organized letter-writing campaigns, delegations, speeches and a variety of other efforts to get him to change his mind. Ultimately, the missing vote was found elsewhere; Hale voted against it but, when it was safely passed, changed his vote to "yay" so he would be on record as having supported it.

Once suffrage was won Florence continued to work with Alice Paul and the NWP on the Equal Rights Amendment. She also dedicated herself to working for world peace; she joined the National Council on Prevention of War, chaired the Government and International Cooperation Committee of the Maine League of Women Voters, served as the state Chairman of Government and international cooperation for the Maine Federation of Churches, and represented the State Peace Commission on the World Unity Council. She also had a weekly radio program on peace on WGAN.

== Works ==
- The God of Things: A Novel of Modern Egypt (1902)
- The Effendi: A Romance of the Soudan (1904)
