= List of dams and reservoirs in Maine =

This list is incomplete. You can help Wikipedia by expanding it.

The following is a list of dams and reservoirs in Maine, USA.

Major dams are linked below. The National Inventory of Dams defines any "major dam" as being 50 feet (15 m) tall with a storage capacity of at least 5,000 acre-feet (6,200,000 m^{3}), or of any height with a storage capacity of 25,000 acre-feet (31,000,000 m^{3}).

== Major dams and reservoirs in Maine ==
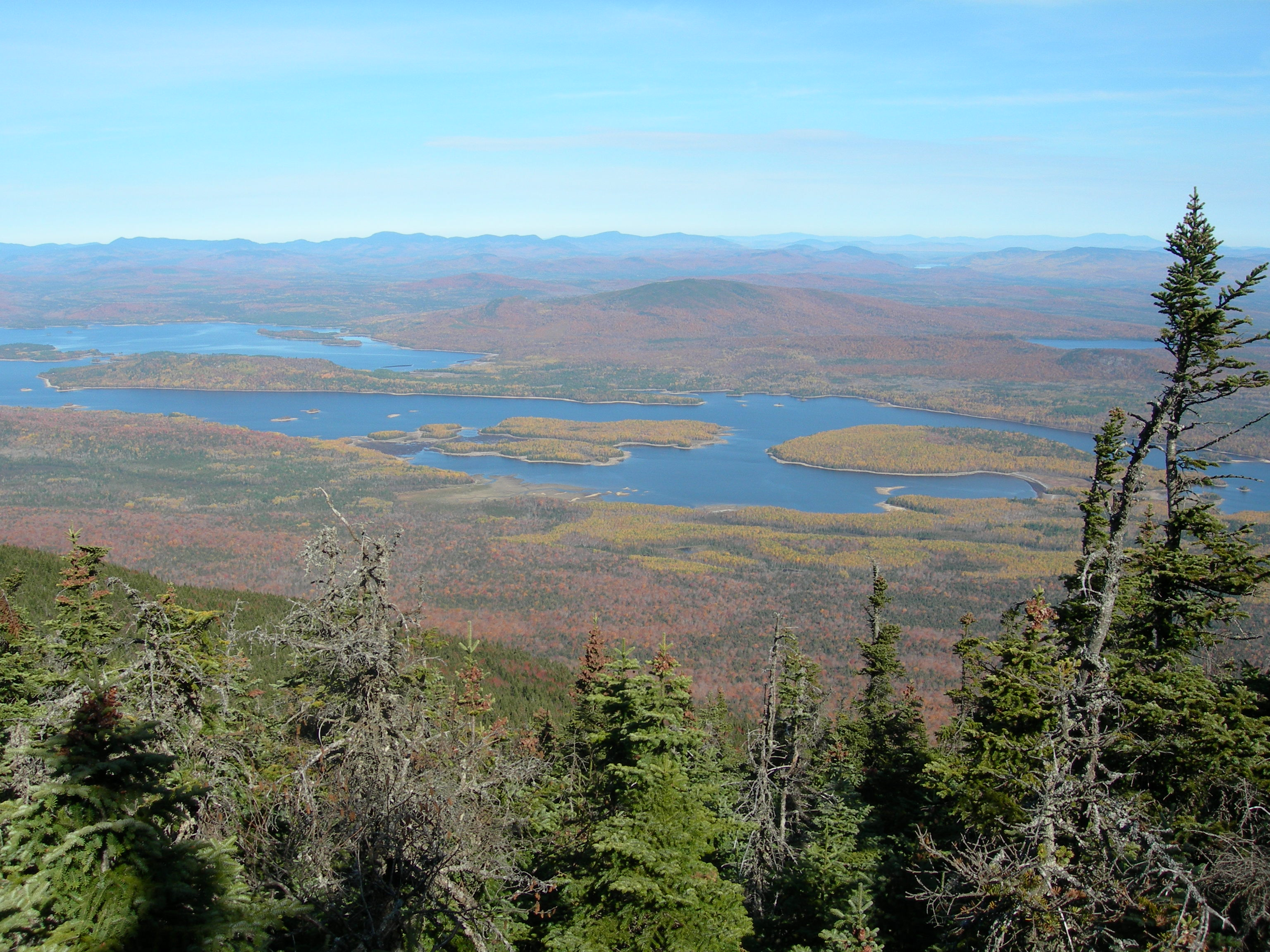
Flagstaff Lake

- Bonny Eagle Dam, unnamed reservoir on the Saco River, NextEra Energy
- Harris Station Dam, Indian Pond, NextEra Energy
- Howland Dam
- Kennebunk Dam, Mousam River
- Lake Auburn
- Long Falls Dam, Flagstaff Lake, NextEra Energy
- Milford Dam
- Milltown Dam, on the Saint Croix River, NB Power
- Orono Dam
- Ripogenus Dam, Hydroelectric Dam at the headwaters of the west branch of the Penobscot River, owned by Brookfield Asset Management
- Skelton Dam, unnamed reservoir on the Saco River, NextEra Energy
- Stillwater Dam
- West Enfield Dam
- Wyman Dam, Wyman Lake, NextEra Energy
- Dolby Hydro Station
- Stone Dam
- East Millinocket
- Weldon Hydro
- Medway Hydro
- Rumford Hydro

== Removed dams ==
- Edwards Dam, on the Kennebec River, privately owned (removed 1999)
- Great Works Dam (removed, 2012)
- Veazie Dam (removed, 2013)
