= Natural Resources Council of Maine =

Non-profit environmental advocacy group

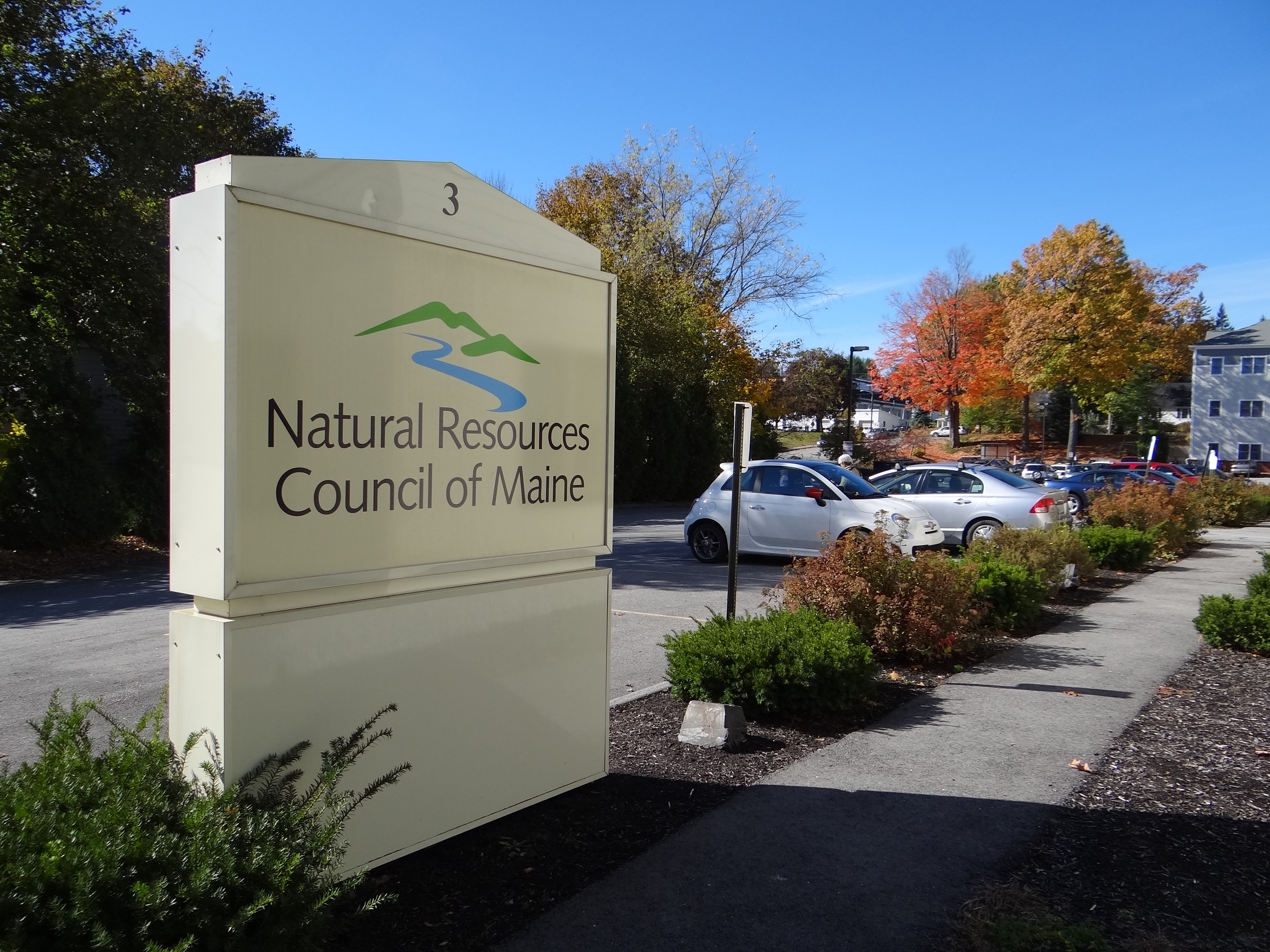
- Founded: 1959
- Type: 501(c)3
- Purpose: Conservation, Advocacy, Education
- Location: Augusta, Maine
- Method: Litigation, education, advocacy
- Key people: Lisa Pohlmann (CEO)
- Website: nrcm.org

The Natural Resources Council of Maine (NRCM) is a Maine-based, 501(c)(3) non-profit organization, with offices in Augusta, Maine. Founded in 1959 as a small, volunteer-based environmental advocacy group, NRCM has grown to be Maine's largest environmental advocacy organization, with more than 25,000 supporters and activists and a staff of 28, including science and policy experts.

== About ==
The Natural Resources Council of Maine was formed on June 25, 1959, when a group of concerned citizens gathered to find a way to protect the Allagash River, which is now the Allagash Wilderness Waterway. NRCM for many years was a coalition of environmental organizations from across Maine that addressed emerging threats to Maine's land, air, and water. NRCM's work through the 1960s and 1970s on a range of environmental and conservation issues positioned the organization as a leader in Maine's growing conservation movement. The organization's mission statement is:

"To protect, restore, and conserve Maine's environment, now and for future generations"

It further states that it "harnesses the power of the law, science, and the voices of more than 30,000 supporters statewide and beyond ... to protect the health of Maine’s rivers, lakes, streams, and coastal waters; promote sustainable communities through initiatives that reduce toxics pollution and waste; decrease air and climate-changing pollution through energy efficiency and renewable sources; conserve Maine lands and wildlife habitat, including our treasured North Woods; and defend the federal environmental policies and programs that help protect Maine". In addition to working on a number of different specific program areas, NRCM monitors the legislative and executive agency rulemaking process at the state government level. Historically the Natural Resources Council of Maine has partnered with citizens and other nonprofit organizations from across Maine to promote issues of mutual concern.

== Programs ==
The Natural Resources Council of Maine focuses on several different program areas:

- The Climate and Clean Energy program works on issues promoting renewable energy and energy efficiency, reducing climate pollution, ensuring the enforcement of the Clean Air Act, and clean transportation alternatives.
- The Healthy Waters program works across the state to prevent contamination of Maine's thousands of lakes, ponds, and streams; to ensure compliance with the Clean Water Act, to remove obsolete dams as part of river restoration efforts, and to ensure water is safe for wildlife, for recreation, and for human consumption.
- The Forests and Wildlife program works to conserve the many undeveloped areas of the state by advocating limiting urban sprawl, balanced development, public lands, and sustainable forest management.
- The Sustainable Maine program works to promote more sustainable waste management programs, especially recycling initiatives, through outreach to individuals, communities, and state government. The program also works to decrease toxic waste and the use of toxic products in consumer products.
- The Federal Program monitors and advocates for policies at the national level that could affect Maine's environmental interests, keeping abreast of the activities of the state's Congressional delegation and the Executive branch of Federal government of the United States.
- NRCM Rising is an outreach program created by and for the next generation, specifically individuals in their twenties, thirties, and forties, for the protection of the environment. The program began in 2014.
- NRCM's State House Watch program actively tracks the Maine State Legislature. NRCM staff regularly submits comments to both legislative committees and executive agencies promoting the organization's interests. Legislative activism is a central aspect of NRCM's operation and mission.

== Significant issues ==
NRCM has been involved with most of Maine's most important environmental issues.

=== 1960s ===
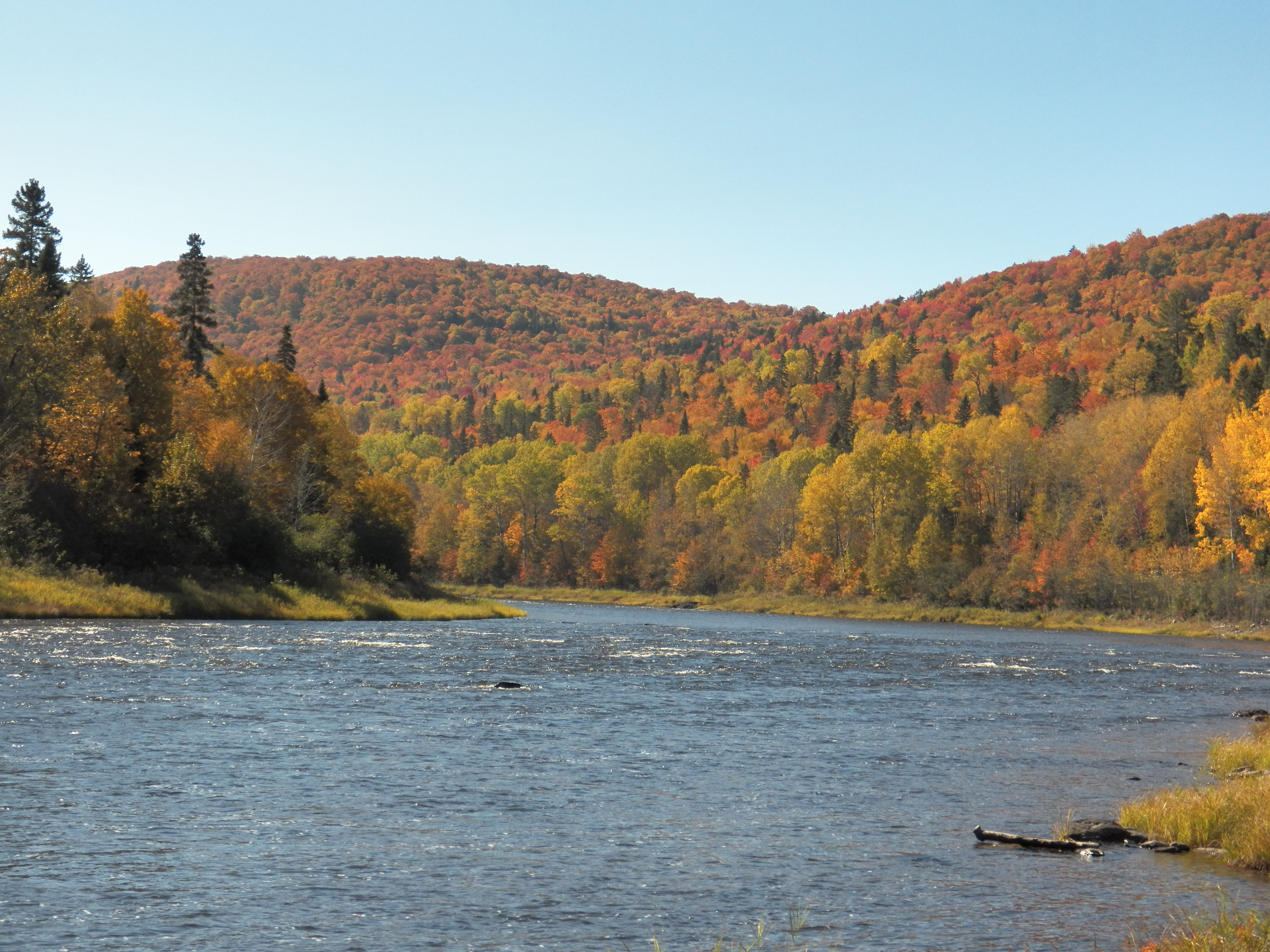
Allagash Waterway, Autumn.

- The major issue that led to the formation of the Natural Resource Council of Maine in 1959 was the increasing risk of deterioration of the Allagash Wilderness Waterway. This almost 100 mile long stretch of streams, lakes, and rivers located in far northern Maine was facing threats from a variety of sources. Encroachment of roadways, poor timber harvesting practices, and several proposed hydropower projects threatened to irreparably change the wilderness character of the Allagash. NRCM worked in concert with established national conservation organizations to promote the value of the Allagash as a designated conservation area. In 1966 the citizens of Maine passed a referendum authorizing the state to issue a $1.5 million bond to purchase the waterway and permanently protect its wilderness character. In 1970, the waterway became part of the National Wild and Scenic Rivers System.

=== 1970s ===
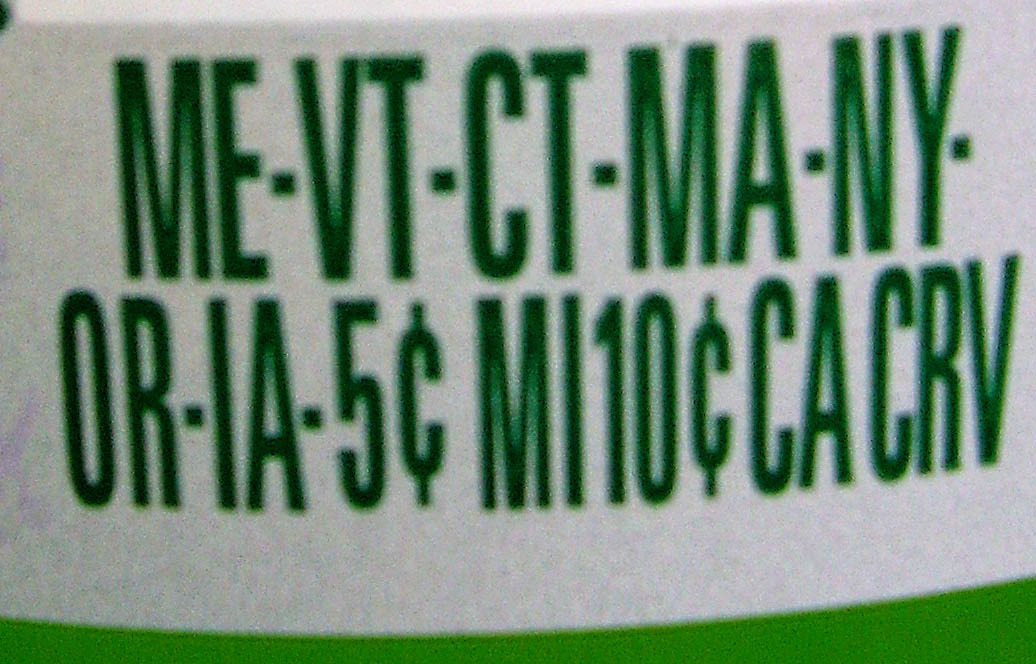
Deposit notice on a bottle sold in the continental U.S. indicating the container's deposit value in various states

- NRCM was a key supporter of the so-called "Bottle Bill" legislation approved by Maine voters in November 1976. Angus King, then in private practice as an attorney in Brunswick, Maine, acted as NRCM's primary lobbyist on the issue at the Maine Legislature. The bill, which required beverage manufacturers to charge a bottle redemption fee on bottles and cans, is arguably Maine's oldest and most successful recycling promotion law. The legislation has come under fire numerous times since its adoption, but NRCM and other product stewardship organizations have worked successfully to preserve it against attempts at repeal several times over the last 40 years.
- In 1977, Governor James B. Longley signed a bill that banned and removed billboards across the state, making Maine the second state in the US to prohibit off-premises billboards. NRCM helped to rally support for this original law and has led opposition against later attempts to weaken it.

=== 1980s ===
- Working with several other conservation groups within the state, NRCM opposed and eventually prevented the Great Northern Paper Company's proposed Big A dam project on the West Branch of the Penobscot River. The proposed dam would have created a lake several miles in length, and flooded out some of the most important stretches of wild water in the Northeast United States. Specifically, the dam would have submerged the Ripogenus Gorge; a deep gorge along the West Branch of the Penobscot River that had the potential to be designated a Natural National Landmark. Further, the dam had the potential to disrupt some of the most pristine existing habitats for landlocked salmon spawning.
- In 1987 NRCM was one of the primary supporters of both the legislation and the public referendum that led to the formation of the Land for Maine's Future program. In response to growing concerns about unchecked development, urban sprawl, real-estate speculation, and the potential for the loss of lands significant to Maine's cultural heritage, the citizens of Maine voted to approve a $35 million bond package intended to finance the state purchase of lands of statewide importance.

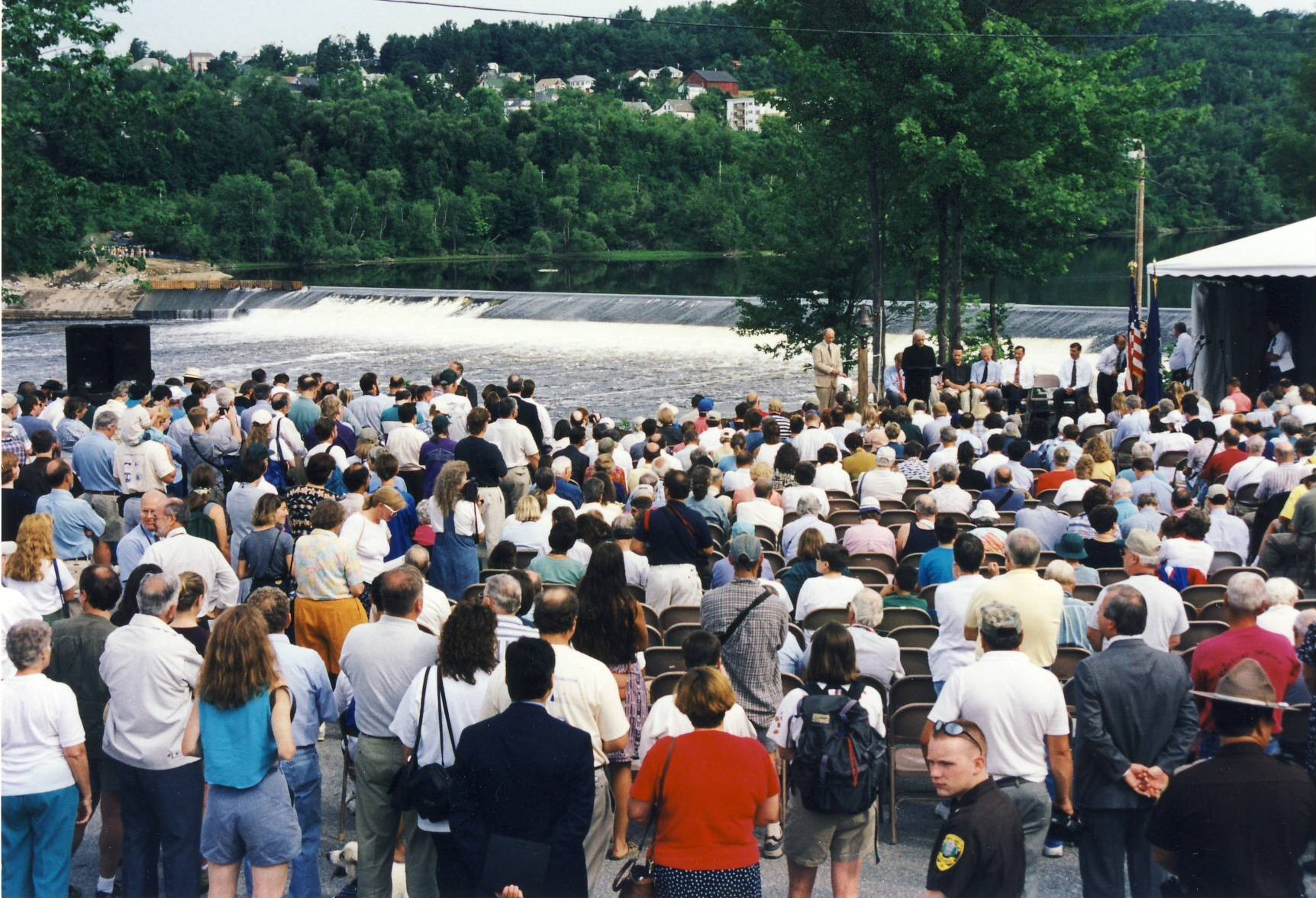
Breaching of the Edwards Dam. July 1, 1999; Augusta, ME

=== 1990s ===
- Breaching of the Edwards Dam on the Kennebec River When the Edwards Dam's license came up for review in the late 1980s, a coalition of Maine-based conservation groups, led by the Natural Resources Council of Maine, lobbied before the Federal Energy Regulatory Commission for the dam's decertification and deconstruction. They argued that the economic and ecological value of restoring the river to a more natural state, which included the return of sea-run species of fish, far outweighed the benefit of hydroelectric energy production at the site. After a long period of debate and consideration, the FERC ultimately agreed with conservation groups and issued a landmark ruling calling for the removal of dam. The dam was removed on July 1, 1999. The breaching of the Edwards Dam established a useful precedent that was later used to decommission and breach other obsolete dams in other places in the state.

=== 2000s ===
- In 2004, NRCM successfully lobbied for passage of the nation's first state-level e-waste recycling law. Under the law, certain categories of e-waste are banned from landfills, costs to consumers are reduced for disposal at designated transfer stations, and companies are billed for the cost of recycling the materials at the end of their life. Since Maine's passage of this landmark law, 24 other states have passed legislation requiring statewide e-waste recycling.
- In 2005, Plum Creek, a real-estate development company based in Washington state, submitted the largest development proposal in state history. The proposed development would have built two resorts, hundreds of residential units, a marina, a golf course, and other facilities on the southern shores of Maine's Moosehead Lake. NRCM was the first organization to oppose the plan on the grounds that it was too much development in an inappropriate area. Working with stakeholders across the state, NRCM forced a number of concessions from the developers, and, although the proposal was eventually allowed to move forward, NRCM continued to act as a watchdog to ensure the plan and process were subject to public scrutiny and responsive to public input

=== 2010s ===
- In collaboration with the Penobscot Nation, American Rivers, the Atlantic Salmon Federation, Maine Audubon, The Nature Conservancy, and Trout Unlimited, NRCM formed the Penobscot River Restoration Project—a coalition organized to rejuvenate the Penobscot River and reconnect the Gulf of Maine to inland waters. After more than a decade of work and fundraising efforts, the coalition successfully purchased and removed the Great Works and Veazie Dams, and built a natural fish bypass around the Howland Dam, restoring passage for native sea-run fish and reviving wildlife populations that depend on them for survival.
- NRCM was one of the leading proponents of the 87,500-acre Katahdin Woods and Waters National Monument established by President Obama on Aug. 24, 2016. The National Monument is located in northern Maine, east of Baxter State Park. Although some residents in the region initially opposed the proposal,^{[15]} on the grounds that it would interfere with the traditional forest products industries in the area, the eventual closure of paper mills in the towns of Millinocket and East Millinocket and the recognition by local residents and businesses, including the Katahdin Area Chamber of Commerce, that the National Monument would help diversify their local economy led many to support the National Monument.
- NRCM played a significant role in the effort to get South Portland, Maine to pass an ordinance banning the shipment of oil from Canadian tar sands through existing pipeline infrastructure located in that city.
- NRCM was the lead opponent of an effort to weaken mining regulations in response to an open-pit mining proposal on Bald Mountain in northern Maine. After a six-year endeavor, the Maine Legislature overrode a veto from former Governor Paul LePage and passed the strictest mining regulations in the nation.
- In 2019, Maine became the first state in the US to enact a ban on polystyrene (Styrofoam) food containers and the third state to prohibit single-use plastic shopping bags at checkout. NRCM had been providing support to local activists to pass such bans at the municipal level for years and was instrumental in rallying support for these bans at the statewide level.
- Also in 2019, NRCM worked successfully with the Maine Legislature to pass landmark bills aimed at reforming renewable energy policy, and combatting and mitigating the effects of climate change.

=== 2020s ===
- The Natural Resources Council of Maine led efforts to pass a first-in-the-nation Extended Producer Responsibility (EPR) for Packaging law to make companies that produce packaging help pay the costs of recycling these materials in 2021.

== Notable members ==
Angus King, US Senator from Maine 2012–present, worked as NRCM's primary legislative lobbyist for a number of years in the 1970s.

Jon Hinck, former member of the Maine House of Representatives, contributing founder of Greenpeace U.S.A., and former member of the Portland, Maine city council, acted as staff attorney for the Natural Resources Council of Maine from 2003 to 2006. Hinck's work was vital in the passage of the landmark 2004 electronic waste law, requiring manufacturers for the first time to take responsibility for environmentally sound recycling of certain kinds of electronics, like computers and televisions.

Bruce Poliquin, US House of Representatives from Maine's 2nd Congressional District 2014–2019, is a former NRCM board member.

Chellie Pingree, US House of Representatives from Maine's 1st Congressional District 2008–present, is a member of NRCM's National Advisory Board.

Brownie Carson, Maine State Senator from 2016 to 2020, acted as the executive director of the Natural Resources Council of Maine from 1984 to 2011. Carson is widely considered as one of the leading voices on conservation and environmental issues in Maine and the Northeast. Former United States Senator Olympia Snowe called him, 'one of the principal architects of the Maine Environmental Movement." He was awarded the EPA's Lifetime Achievement Award in 2011.

Leon Gorman, former president and chairman of the board of L.L. Bean and grandson of L.L. Bean founder Leon Leonwood Bean, was a member of the Natural Resources Council of Maine's National Advisory Board.

George J. Mitchell, former United States Senator/Senate Majority Leader and United States Special Envoy to Northern Ireland, presented the keynote speech at the Natural Resources Council of Maine's 2011 Annual Meeting. Senator Mitchell addressed a number of different issues, including political gridlock in Washington D.C., the success of the Clean Water Act, and the need to keep working to find solutions to the challenges posed by Climate Change.

== Awards and recognition ==
In 1999, as part of their work with the Kennebec Coalition, NRCM received the Gulf of Maine Visionary Award from the Gulf of Maine Council on the Marine Environment. The award recognized the coalition's efforts to remove the Edwards Dam.

In 2007, NRCM was celebrated as one of the EPA's Climate Award Winners for their "demonstrated leader(ship) on climate protection at the state level and beyond". Specifically, NRCM received the award for their public education initiatives aimed at informing the cities and citizens of Maine about the dangers of sea-level rise related to climate change and their work in the establishment of the Regional Greenhouse Gas Initiative.

In 2008, the Natural Resources Council of Maine, as part of the Partners in Penobscot River Restoration Project, received the United States Department of the Interior's Cooperative Conservation Award for their work to restore 11 species of sea-run fish and balance hydropower generation and ecological integrity in the Penobscot river watershed.
