= List of dam removals in Maine =

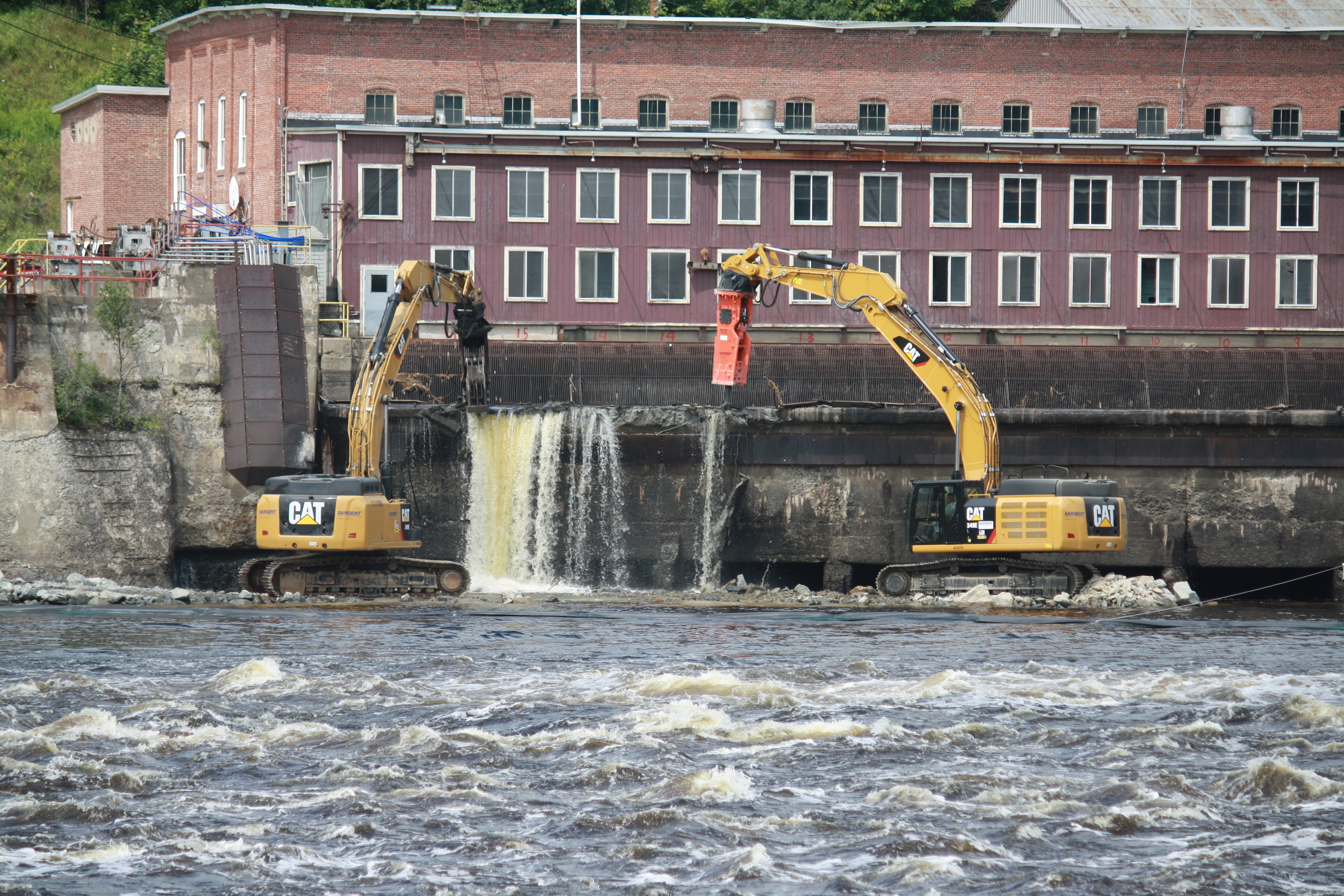
Excavators removing the Veazie Dam on the Penobscot River in 2013.

This is a list of dams in Maine that have been removed as physical impediments to free-flowing rivers or streams.

== Removals by watershed ==
=== Bagaduce River ===
A dam owned by the Town of Penobscot on Winslow Stream, a tributary of the tidal Bagaduce River, was used to maintain the water level of Wight Pond. It was replaced with a fish passage in 2017 to allow alewife to access the pond for spawning while still maintaining the water level.

=== Kennebec River ===
Built in 1837, the 24-foot (7.3 m) tall hydroelectric Edwards Dam on the Kennebec River blocked passage to Atlantic salmon and American shad. It was removed in 1999 after the Federal Energy Regulatory Commission refused to renew its license, marking the first time the federal government ordered the removal of a dam against the wishes of its owners.

In 2025, The Nature Conservancy announced the purchase of four dams on the river – Lockwood, Hydro-Kennebec, Shawmut, and Weston – which would eventually be removed to allow for greater upstream migration of fish.

=== Penobscot River ===
Two dams have been removed as part of the Penobscot River Restoration Project: the Great Works Dam in 2012 and the Veazie Dam in 2013, each 20 feet (6.1 m) tall.

=== Sheepscot River ===
The 20 ft (6.1 m) tall Coopers Mill Dam was removed from the Sheepscot River in 2018. One year later, the furthest downstream barrier on the river, the 15 ft (4.6 m) tall Head Tide Dam, was partially removed and replaced with an elevated platform to allow for fish passage. The Head Tide Dam was a former grist mill dam that was purchased by the Atlantic Salmon Federation and the Town of Alna for the purposes of removal.

The 35 ft (11 m) Lower Montsweag Dam on Montsweag Brook, a tributary of the Sheepscot River, had been built to create an emergency water source for the Maine Yankee Nuclear Power Plant. The dam was removed in 2010 following the plant's decommissioning in 1997.

=== St. George River ===
At the time of its removal in 2002, Sennebec Dam was the last man-made barrier on the St. George River. The dam had raised the natural water level on Sennebec Pond, and was replaced with a fish ramp that maintained the level while opening 17 miles (27 km) of the river and 1,100 acres (450 ha) of lake habitat to fish passage.

== Completed removals ==
Dam	Height	Year removed	Location	Watercourse	Watershed
Little River Dam		2009	Lisbon; 43.9944°N 70.0502°W	Little River	Androscoggin River
Farnsworth Dam	13 ft (4.0 m)	2019	Lisbon; 44.0211°N 70.092°W	Sabattus River	Androscoggin River
Upper River Dam (Upper Town Dam)	8 ft (2.4 m)	2022	Lisbon; 44.0329°N 70.104°W	Sabattus River	Androscoggin River
Unnamed remnant dam		2010	Washburn; 46.7811°N 68.1587°W	Salmon Brook	Aroostook River
Washburn Mill Pond Dam		2014	Washburn; 46.792°N 68.1571°W	Salmon Brook	Aroostook River
Unnamed remnant dam		2013	Riley Township; 44.5014°N 70.9213°W	Sunday River	Aroostook River
Wight Pond Dam	3 ft (0.91 m)	2017	Penobscot; 44.4511°N 68.6742°W	Winslow Stream	Bagaduce River
Smelt Brook Dam		2018	Sullivan; 44.5049°N 68.1614°W	Smelt Brook	Frenchman Bay
Kate Furbish Dam	13 ft (4.0 m)	2016	Brunswick; 43.8661°N 69.9345°W	Tributary to Harpswell Cove	Harpswell Sound
Edwards Dam	24 ft (7.3 m)	1999	Augusta; 44.3249°N 69.7697°W	Kennebec River	Kennebec River
Lombard Dam		2018	Vassalboro; 44.4637°N 69.614°W	Outlet Stream	Kennebec River
Masse Dam	17 ft (5.2 m)	2017	Vassalboro; 44.4519°N 69.607°W	Outlet Stream	Kennebec River
Morneau Remnants Dam	6 ft (1.8 m)	2021	Vassalboro; 44.4569°N 69.6088°W	Outlet Stream	Kennebec River
Madison Electric Dam		2006	Starks; 44.7313°N 69.8981°W	Sandy River	Kennebec River
Fort Halifax Dam		2008	Winslow; 44.5391°N 69.6258°W	Sebasticook River	Kennebec River
Main Street Dam		2002	Newport; 44.8352°N 69.272°W	East Branch Sebasticook River	Kennebec River
Mill Dam		2000	Corinna; 44.9219°N 69.2609°W	East Branch Sebasticook River	Kennebec River
Archer's Mill Dam	12 ft (3.7 m)	1999	Stetson; 44.8876°N 69.1379°W	Stetson Stream	Kennebec River
Walton's Mill Dam	16 ft (4.9 m)	2022	Farmington; 44.6602°N 70.1658°W	Temple Stream	Kennebec River
Goff Mill Brook Dam	4 ft (1.2 m)	2015	Arundel	Goff Mill Brook	Kennebunk River
East Machias Dam		2000	East Machias; 44.7389°N 67.3889°W	East Machias River	Machias River
Canaan Lake Outlet Dam		1999	North Washington; 44.9667°N 67.7749°W	Old Stream	Machias River
Northern Stream Rock Dam		2020	East Machias; 44.9759°N 67.521°W	Northern Stream	Machias River
West Winterport Dam	16 ft (4.9 m)	2010	Winterport and Frankfort; 44.6185°N 68.958°W	Marsh Stream	Penobscot River
Bangor Dam	4 ft (1.2 m)	1995	Bangor; 44.8101°N 68.7417°W	Penobscot River	Penobscot River
Great Works Dam	20 ft (6.1 m)	2012	Old Town; 44.9207°N 68.6319°W	Penobscot River	Penobscot River
Veazie Dam	30 ft (9.1 m)	2013	Veazie and Eddington; 44.8325°N 68.7008°W	Penobscot River	Penobscot River
Brownville Dam	12 ft (3.7 m)	1999	Brownville; 45.3064°N 69.0344°W	Pleasant River (Piscataquis River tributary)	Penobscot River
Lower Sedgeunkedunk Dam		2009	Brewer; 44.7652°N 68.7798°W	Sedgeunkedunk Stream	Penobscot River
Grist Mill Dam	14 ft (4.3 m)	1998	Hampden; 44.7487°N 68.8329°W	Souadabscook Stream	Penobscot River
Hampden Recreation Area Dam	2 ft (0.61 m)	1999		Souadabscook Stream	Penobscot River
Mast Point Dam		1997	Berwick; 43.287°N 70.8982°W	Salmon Falls River	Piscataqua River
Shoreys Brook Dam	18 ft (5.5 m)	2011	South Berwick and Eliot; 43.1813°N 70.8189°W	Shoreys Brook	Piscataqua River
Columbia Falls Dam	9 ft (2.7 m)	1988	Steuben; 44.6531°N 67.7273°W	Pleasant River (Pleasant Bay)	Pleasant River (Pleasant Bay)
Smelt Hill Dam		2002	Falmouth; 43.7183°N 70.2693°W	Presumpscot River	Presumpscot River
Saccarappa Dam 1 (east)	12 ft (3.7 m)	2019	Westbrook; 43.6779°N 70.3695°W	Presumpscot River	Presumpscot River
Saccarappa Dam 2 (west)	12 ft (3.7 m)	2019	Westbrook; 43.6789°N 70.3692°W	Presumpscot River	Presumpscot River
Swett Brook Dam	4 ft (1.2 m)	2013	Waterford; 44.2566°N 70.7274°W	Swett Brook	Presumpscot River
Randall Mill Dam	10 ft (3.0 m)	2013	Pownal; 43.9297°N 70.191°W	Chandler Brook	Royal River
Unnamed dam		2012	Yarmouth; 43.8053°N 70.1885°W	Royal River	Royal River
Milltown Dam	42 ft (13 m)	2023	Calais; 45.1759°N 67.2929°W	St. Croix River	St. Croix River
Sennebec Dam	15 ft (4.6 m)	2002	Union; 44.2367°N 69.2782°W	St. George River	St. George River
Martin Brook Upper Dam		2010	Madawaska; 47.3453°N 68.3315°W	Martin Brook	Saint John River
Sherman Lake Dam		2008	New Castle; 44.0115°N 69.5979°W	Marsh River	Sheepscot River
Lower Montsweag Dam	35 ft (11 m)	2010	Wiscasset; 43.9686°N 69.7202°W	Montsweag Brook	Sheepscot River
Head Tide Dam	15 ft (4.6 m)	2019	Alna; 44.1149°N 69.623°W	Sheepscot River	Sheepscot River
Coopers Mill Dam	20 ft (6.1 m)	2018	Whitefield; 44.2587°N 69.5506°W	Sheepscot River	Sheepscot River
