= Stillwater Dam (Maine) =

- Location within Maine
- Country: United States
- Location: Old Town, Penobscot County, Maine
- Coordinates: 44.9118100°N 68.6837800°W
- Opening date: 1937
- Owner: Black Bear Hydro

Dam and spillways
- Impounds: Stillwater River
- Height: 20 ft (6 m)
- Length: 1,768 ft (539 m)

Power Station
- Installed capacity: 1.95 MW

The Stillwater Dam is a hydroelectric dam on the Stillwater River in Old Town north of downtown Orono in Penobscot County, Maine. As a part of the Penobscot River restoration and the removal of the Great Works and Veazie dams, the Stillwater Dam and the Orono Dam will be upgraded to maintain previous levels of power generation.
