= Orono Dam =

- Location within Maine
- Country: United States
- Location: Orono, Penobscot County, Maine
- Coordinates: 44.883520°N 68.66470°W
- Opening date: 1960
- Owner: Black Bear Hydro

Dam and spillways
- Impounds: Stillwater River
- Height: 25 ft (8 m)
- Length: 1,125 ft (343 m)

Power Station
- Installed capacity: 2.78 MW

The Orono Dam is a hydroelectric dam on the Stillwater River at its confluence with the Penobscot River in Orono, Penobscot County, Maine. As a part of the Penobscot River restoration and the removal of the Great Works and Veazie dams, the Orono Dam and Stillwater Dam will be upgraded to maintain previous levels of power generation.
