= West Enfield Dam =

- Location within Maine
- Country: United States
- Location: Penobscot County, Maine
- Coordinates: 45.250280°N 68.649060°W
- Opening date: 1894

Dam and spillways
- Impounds: Penobscot River
- Height: 23 ft (7 m)
- Length: 970 ft (296 m)

Power Station
- Commission date: 1988
- Turbines: 2 × 11.4 MW bulb
- Installed capacity: 22.8 MW

The West Enfield Dam, also known as the Stanford Dam, is a hydroelectric dam on the Penobscot River just above its confluence with the Piscataquis River between the towns of Enfield and Howland in Penobscot County, Maine, USA.The dam actually traverses a thin strip of the territory of the Penobscot Indian Island Reservation. The dam has a fish passage. Its power plant has an 13 MW installed capacity.
