= Fay Hyland Botanical Garden =

Arboretum and botanical garden at the University of Maine

Coordinates: 44.8958°N 68.6747°W

- Fay Hyland Botanical Plantation, Fay Hyland Arboretum
- Location within Maine
- Location: On College Avenue, along Stillwater River
- Created: 1934
- Website: Official website

The Fay Hyland Botanical Plantation (also known as the Fay Hyland Arboretum), 10 acres (40,000 m^{2}), is an arboretum and botanical garden located along the Stillwater River on the University of Maine campus in Orono, Maine, United States. It is open to the public daily.

The Arboretum was established in 1934, named in honor of Fay Hyland, and contains living examples of woody plants from Maine and throughout the world.

== See also ==
- List of botanical gardens in the United States
