= Veazie Dam =

Former dam in Maine, United States

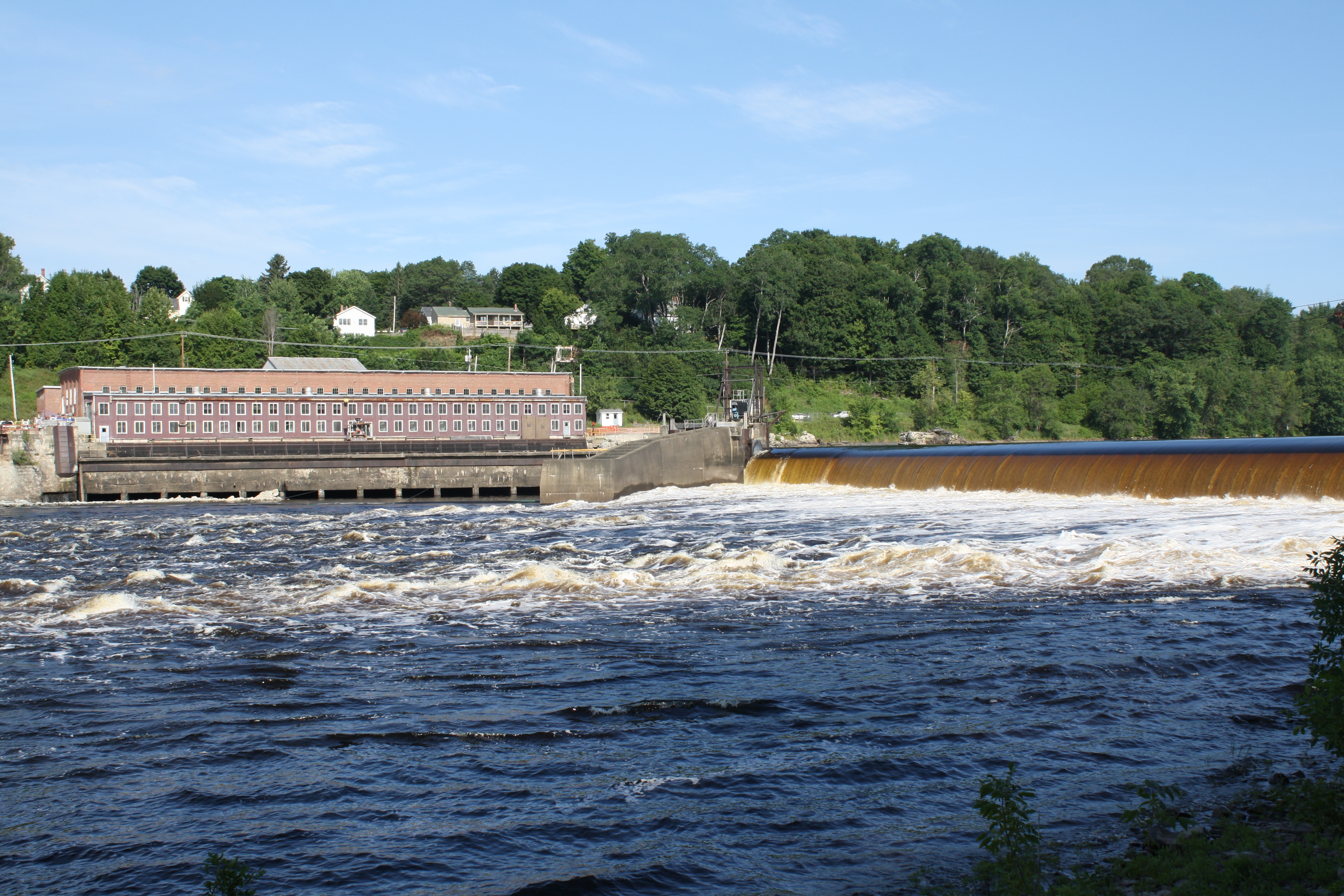
- Veazie Dam before removal in July 2013

- Location within Maine
- Country: United States
- Location: Penobscot County, Maine
- Coordinates: 44.83248°N 68.70094°W
- Status: Decommissioned
- Opening date: 1912
- Demolition date: July 22, 2013

Dam and spillways
- Impounds: Penobscot River
- Height: 20 ft (6 m)
- Length: 1,072 ft (327 m)

Power Station
- Installed capacity: 8.4 MW

The Veazie Dam was a hydroelectric dam on the Penobscot River between Veazie and Eddington in Penobscot County, Maine. In 2010 the Penobscot River Restoration Trust bought the dam from PPL Corporation based on an agreement that was signed in 2004. Deconstruction of the dam began on July 22, 2013 as a part of an extensive project involving four dams to restore eleven species of sea-run fish to the Penobscot River. The Veazie Dam was the furthest downstream of the dams on the Penobscot River; now the Milford and Orono Dam dams are furthest downstream, albeit on separate side of Marsh Island. The Great Works Dam, which was 8 mi (13 km) upstream of the Veazie Dam, was removed in 2012.

== See also ==
- List of dam removals in Maine
