= Milford Dam (Maine) =

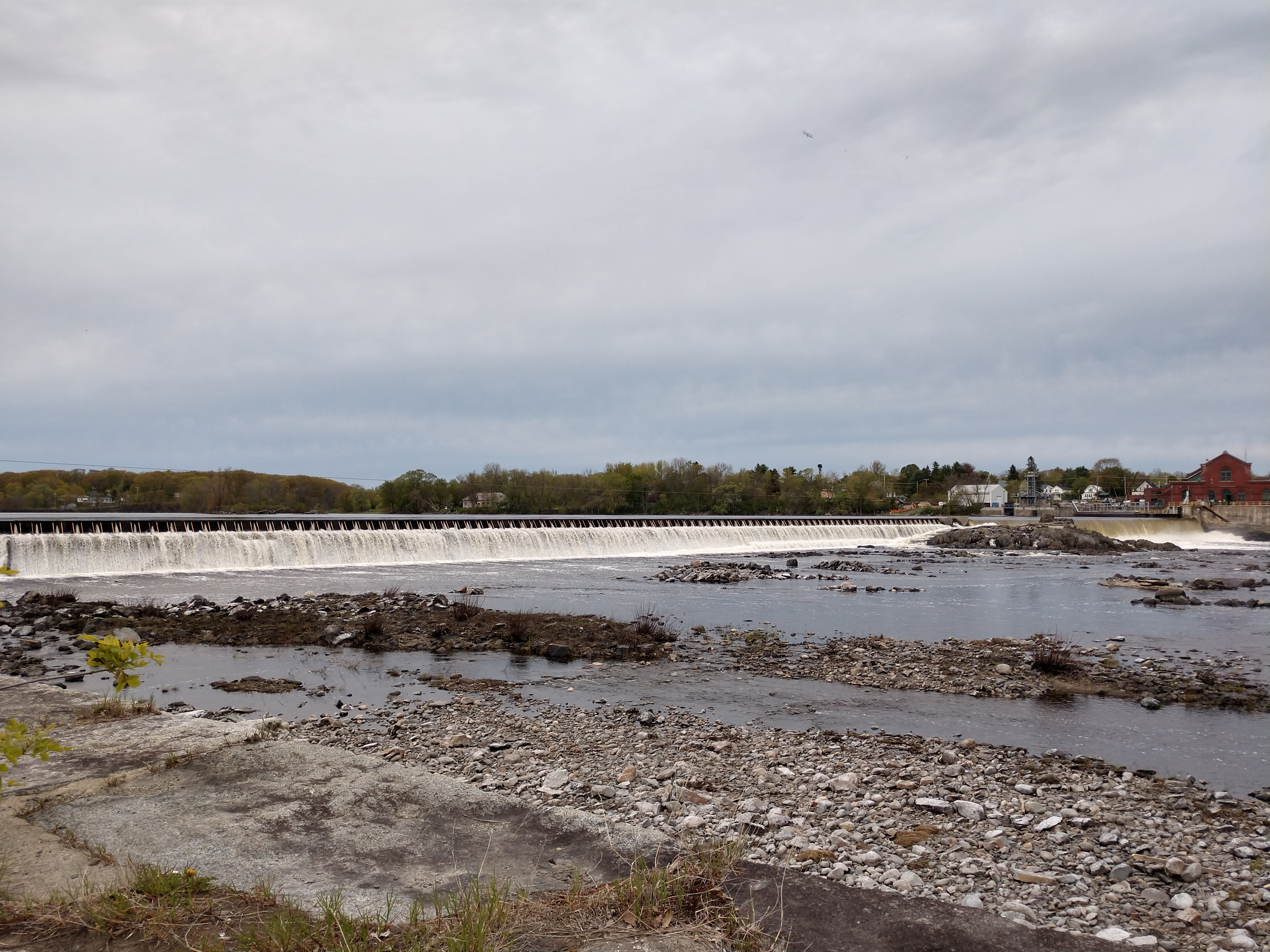
- The Milford Dam, as viewed from Old Town, in May 2018.

- Location within Maine
- Country: United States
- Location: Penobscot County, Maine
- Coordinates: 44.9407400°N 68.6478100°W
- Opening date: 1906

Dam and spillways
- Impounds: Penobscot River
- Height: 20 ft (6 m)
- Length: 1,400 ft (427 m)

Power Station
- Commission date: 1942-1956
- Turbines: 5 x 1.6 MW Kaplan-type
- Installed capacity: 8 MW

The Milford Dam is a dam on the Penobscot River between Old Town and Milford in Penobscot County, Maine. The dam received a new fish lift as a part of an extensive project involving four dams to restore eleven species of sea-run fish to the Penobscot River. The Great Works Dam was removed in 2012 and was just downstream of the Milford Dam. The dam's power plant has an 8 MW installed capacity.
