= Wyman Dam =

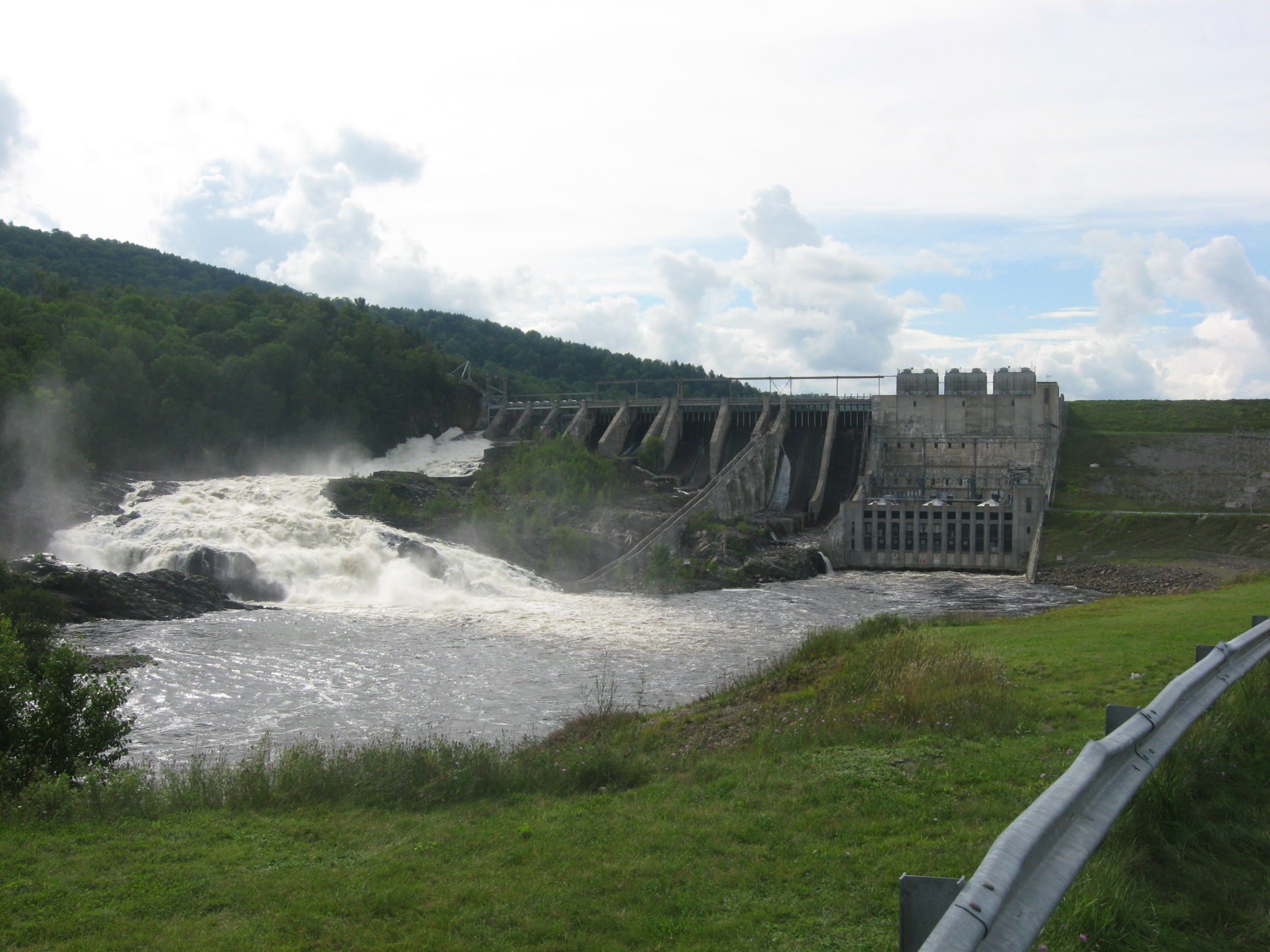

- Location within Maine Location within the United States
- Country: United States
- Location: Somerset County, Maine
- Coordinates: 45°04′11″N 69°54′23″W
- Status: Operational
- Opening date: 1930
- Built by: Central Maine Power Company
- Operator: NextEra Energy

Dam and spillways
- Height: 155 ft (47 m)
- Length: 3,054 ft (931 m)

Reservoir
- Total capacity: 194,016 acre-feet (239 million cubic metres)
- Surface area: 5 sq mi (13 km^{2})
- Normal elevation: 482 ft (147 m)

Power Station
- Turbines: 3 x 24 MW
- Installed capacity: 72 MW

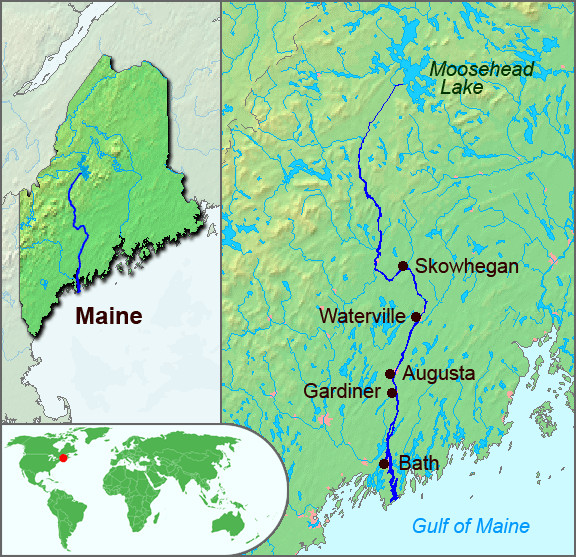
Kennebec River, Maine. Wyman Dam stands roughly halfway between Skowhegan and its source, Moosehead Lake

Wyman Dam is a hydroelectric dam in Somerset County, Maine.

The dam was built in 1930 and connects the southwest corner of the town of Moscow with the southeast corner of Pleasant Ridge Plantation. Owned and operated by NextEra Energy, one of six of their hydroelectric facilities on the Kennebec River, it is named in honor of Walter S. Wyman, the president of the original builder Central Maine Power Company. The dam is partly earthen and partly concrete, with a height of 155 feet (47 m) and 3,054 feet (931 m) long at its crest. The dam's power plant houses three 24 MW turbine generators.

Wyman Lake, the riverine reservoir formed by the dam, contains 194,016 acre-feet (239 million cubic metres), among the largest lakes in Maine. Its normal surface area is over 5 square miles (13 km^{2}). It stretches northward from the dam, and forms the border between not only Moscow and Pleasant Ridge Plantation, but also between the town of Caratunk and Northwest Somerset.
