= Harris Station Dam =

Hydroelectric dam in Maine

Indian Pond
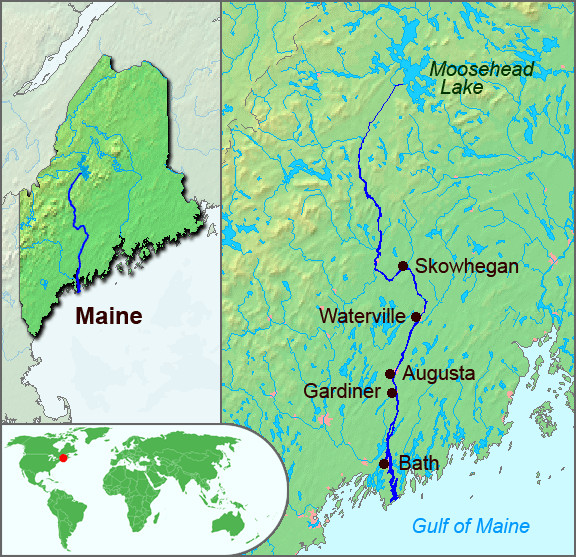
- Kennebec River, Maine. Harris Station Dam stands 12 miles (19 km) downstream from its source at Moosehead Lake, and Indian Pond floods the river for 9 miles (14 km) upstream of the dam.

- Location within Maine
- Location: Somerset County, Maine
- Coordinates: 45°31′N 69°49′W
- Basin countries: United States
- Max. length: 9 mi (14 km)
- Surface area: 3,455 acres (1,398 ha)
- Max. depth: 118 feet (36 m)
- Water volume: 64,093 acre⋅ft (79,058,000 m^{3})
- Surface elevation: 955 ft (291 m)

Harris Station Dam is a hydroelectric dam in Northeast Somerset, Somerset County, Maine. Also known as the Indian Pond Project, the dam was built from 1952 to 1954 as the largest hydroelectric dam in the state of Maine. It impounds the Kennebec River at the southern end of the natural Indian Pond, about 12 miles (19 km) downstream from Moosehead Lake.

The concrete gravity structure is 175 feet (53 m) high and was named for Ford Harris, the chief engineer of original builders Central Maine Power. The dam creates about 86 megawatts of hydroelectric power. It is owned and operated by Brookfield Renewable.

The Kennebec River valley is flooded upstream of the dam northeasterly through Indian Stream township into Sapling township. Tributaries Bog Brook, Gold Brook, Falls Brook, Coburn Brook, and Brandy Brook enter the west side of the reservoir. East side tributaries are Burnham Brook draining Burnham Pond, and Indian Stream draining Little Indian Bog, Big Indian Pond, Trout Pond, and Moore Bog. The reservoir has good cold water habitat for brook trout, lake trout, and land-locked Atlantic salmon.
