= Stillwater River (Maine) =

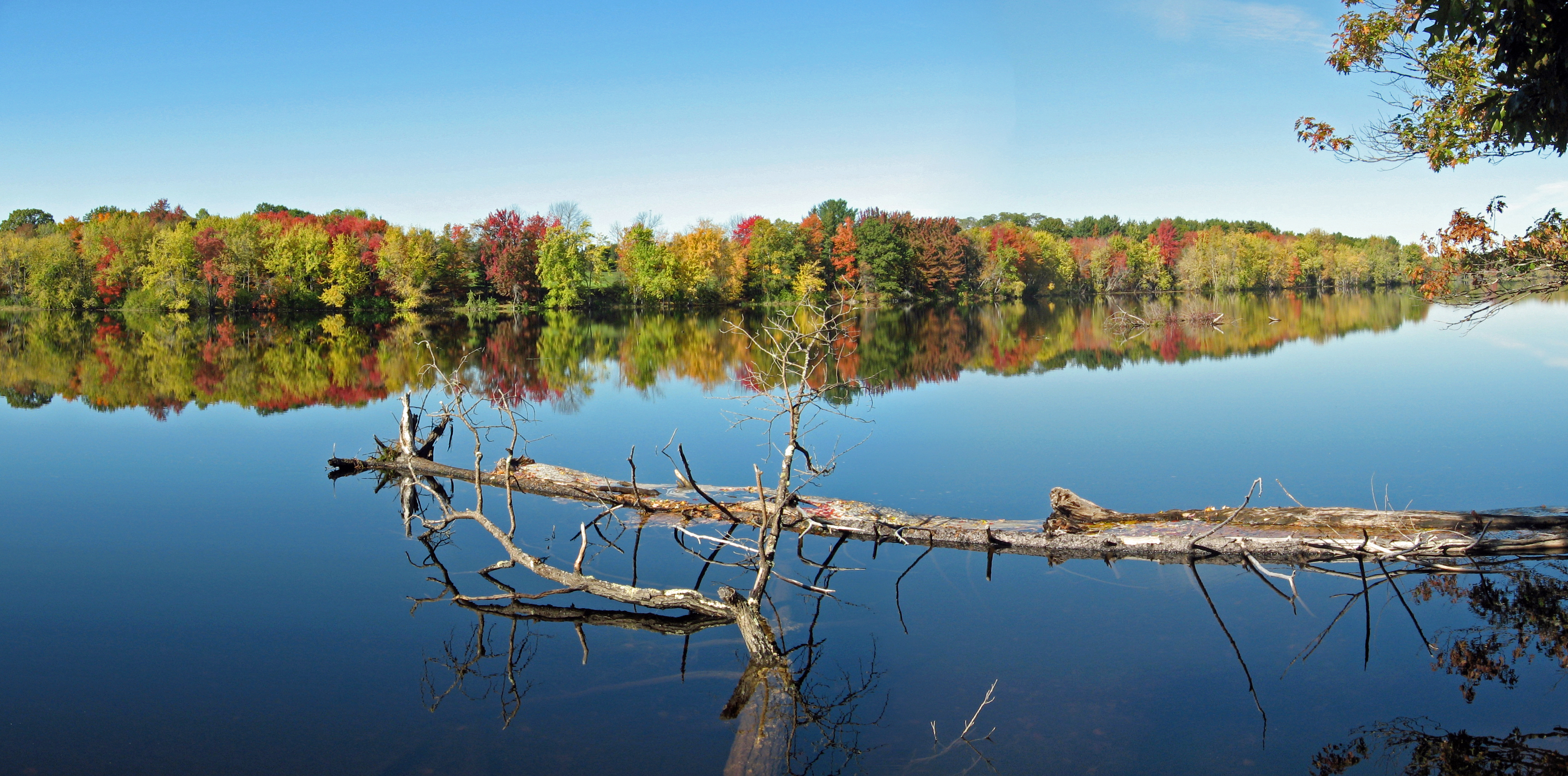

Location
- Country: United States

Physical characteristics
- Source
  - location: Maine
  - elevation: 100 feet (30 m)
- Mouth
  - location: Penobscot River
  - coordinates: 44°52′56″N 68°39′49″W
  - elevation: 50 feet (15 m)
- Length: 11.5 mi (18.5 km)

The Stillwater River is an 11.5-mile-long (18.5 km) side channel of the Penobscot River in Maine. From its source (44°57′59″N 68°38′45″W) in Old Town, the Stillwater runs 2.3 miles (3.7 km) northwest along the northeast side of Orson Island, the site of the Penobscot Indian Reservation. It then runs 9.2 miles (14.8 km) south along the west sides of Orson and Marsh islands, over three dammed falls. The stream rejoins the main stem of the Penobscot in Orono.

The University of Maine campus, including the Fay Hyland Botanical Plantation, overlooks the Stillwater River near its confluence with the Penobscot River.

Some parts of the Penobscot River are known to be contaminated with mercury and other contaminants, making it unsafe for fishing or swimming.

== See also ==
- List of rivers of Maine
