= Milltown Dam (St. Croix River) =

Hydroelectric dam in Canada

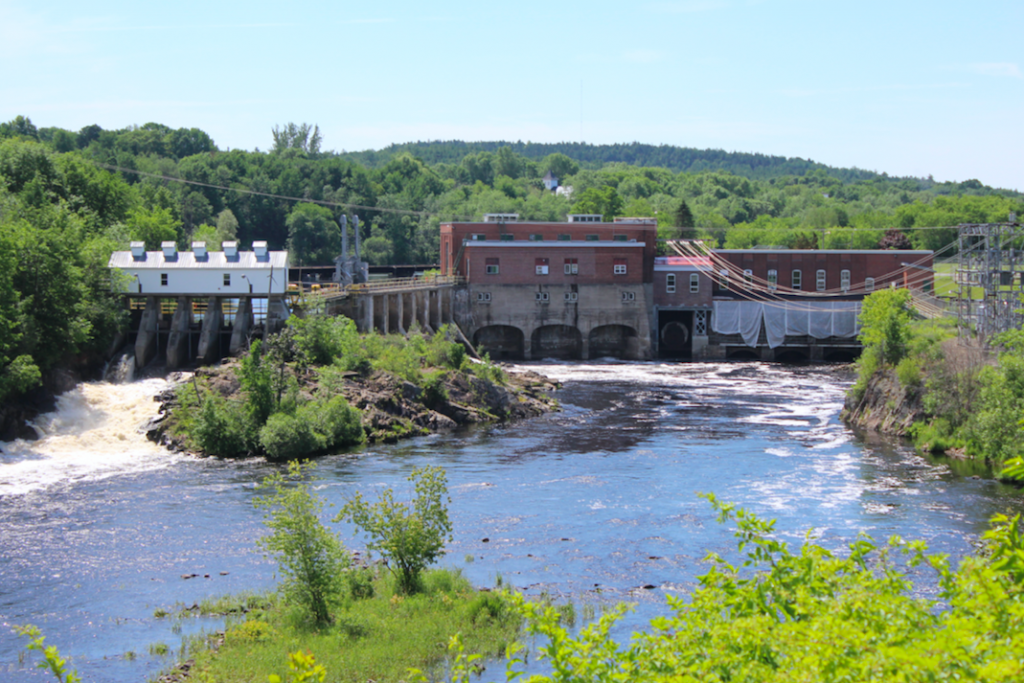
- Milltown Dam before removal, 2019
- Interactive map of Milltown Dam
- Official name: Milltown Generating Station; La centrale de Milltown (French)
- Country: Canada; United States
- Location: St. Stephen, New Brunswick; Calais, Maine
- Coordinates: 45.1759°N 67.2929°W
- Status: Decommissioned
- Opening date: 1881
- Demolition date: 2023
- Owner: NB Power

Dam and spillways
- Impounds: St. Croix River
- Height (foundation): 13 metres (43 ft)
- Height (thalweg): 20 metres (66 ft)
- Length: 183 metres (600 ft)

The Milltown Dam (French: Barrage de Milltown) was a hydroelectric dam on the St. Croix River between St. Stephen, New Brunswick, Canada and Calais, Maine, United States. The dam was operated by NB Power from 1881 to 2023.

== History ==
=== Construction and energy output ===
Built in 1881 and modernized in the early 1900s, the Milltown Dam was the oldest hydroelectric dam in Canada before its decommissioning. It was also the first hydroelectric facility built by the New Brunswick Electric Power Corporation. The power house had a capacity of 4 megawatts with 7 turbines.

Before its decommissioning in 2023, the Milltown Dam accounted for 0.8% of NB Power's total hydroelectricity output. Electricity generated by the Milltown Dam was also exported to the United States, connected to a 69,000-volt transmission circuit owned by the Eastern Maine Electric Cooperative, an electric utility serving Calais.

=== Removal ===
In 2019, NB Power announced its plans to decommission and remove the Milltown Dam, citing the dam's high maintenance cost and low energy output. Although NB Power considered refurbishing the dam, the estimated cost was above $60 million, while the cost of removal would be around $20 million. After receiving approval from the Department of Environment and Local Government, the United States Army Corps of Engineers, and the Maine Department of Environmental Protection in 2022, the decommissioning of the dam began on July 1, 2023.
