= Kennebec River =

River in Maine, United States

Kennebec River Kinəpékʷihtəkʷ
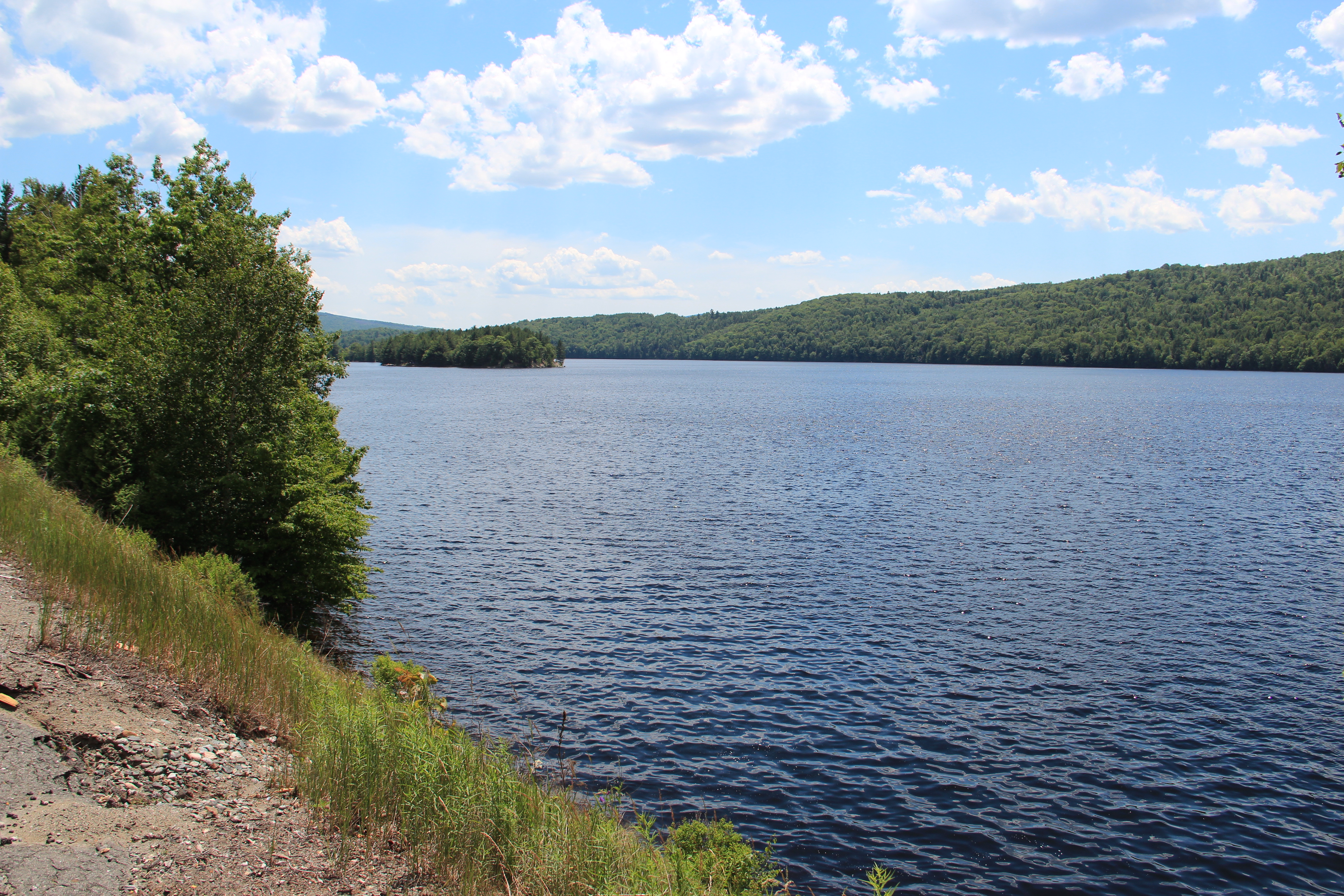
- Wyman Lake on the Kennebec River in Somerset County, Maine

Location
- Country: United States
- State: Maine
- Cities: Bath, Gardiner, Hallowell, Augusta, Waterville

Physical characteristics
- Source
  - location: Moosehead Lake
  - coordinates: 45°35′10″N 69°42′48″W
  - elevation: 1,024 feet (312 m)
- Mouth
  - location: Gulf of Maine, North Atlantic Ocean
  - coordinates: 43°44′06″N 69°46′26″W
- Length: 170 mi (270 km)
- Basin size: 5,869 mi^{2} (15,200 km^{2})
- Discharge
  - average: 9,111 cu ft/s (258.0 m^{3}/s) at its entrance to Merrymeeting Bay

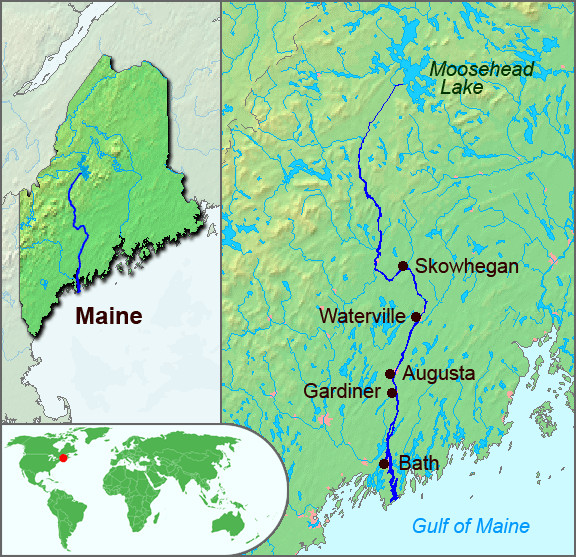
The course of the Kennebec River

The Kennebec River (Abenaki: Kinəpékʷihtəkʷ) is a 170-mile-long (270 km) natural river within the U.S. state of Maine. It rises in Moosehead Lake in west-central Maine. The East and West Outlets join at Indian Pond and the river flows southward. Harris Station Dam, the largest hydroelectric dam in the state, was constructed near that confluence. The river is joined at The Forks by its tributary, the Dead River, also called the West Branch.

It continues south past the towns of Madison and Skowhegan, the city of Waterville, the state capital Augusta, the city of Hallowell, and the city of Gardiner. At Richmond, it flows into Merrymeeting Bay, a 16-mile-long (26 km) freshwater tidal bay, into which also flow the Androscoggin River and five smaller rivers.

The Kennebec runs past the shipbuilding center of Bath, and has its mouth at the Gulf of Maine in the Atlantic Ocean. The Southern Kennebec flows below the fall line and does not have rapids. As a consequence, ocean tides and saltwater fish species, such as the endangered Atlantic Sturgeon, can go upriver affecting the ecology as far north as Waterville, a small city located more than 35 miles inland. Tributaries of the Kennebec include the Carrabassett River, Sandy River, Sebasticook River, and Pleasant Pond (Cobbosseecontee Stream).

Segments of the East Coast Greenway run along the Kennebec.

== Etymology ==
The name Kennebec comes from the Eastern Abenaki /kínipekʷ/, meaning "large body of still water, large bay".

== History ==
=== Discovery by Europeans ===
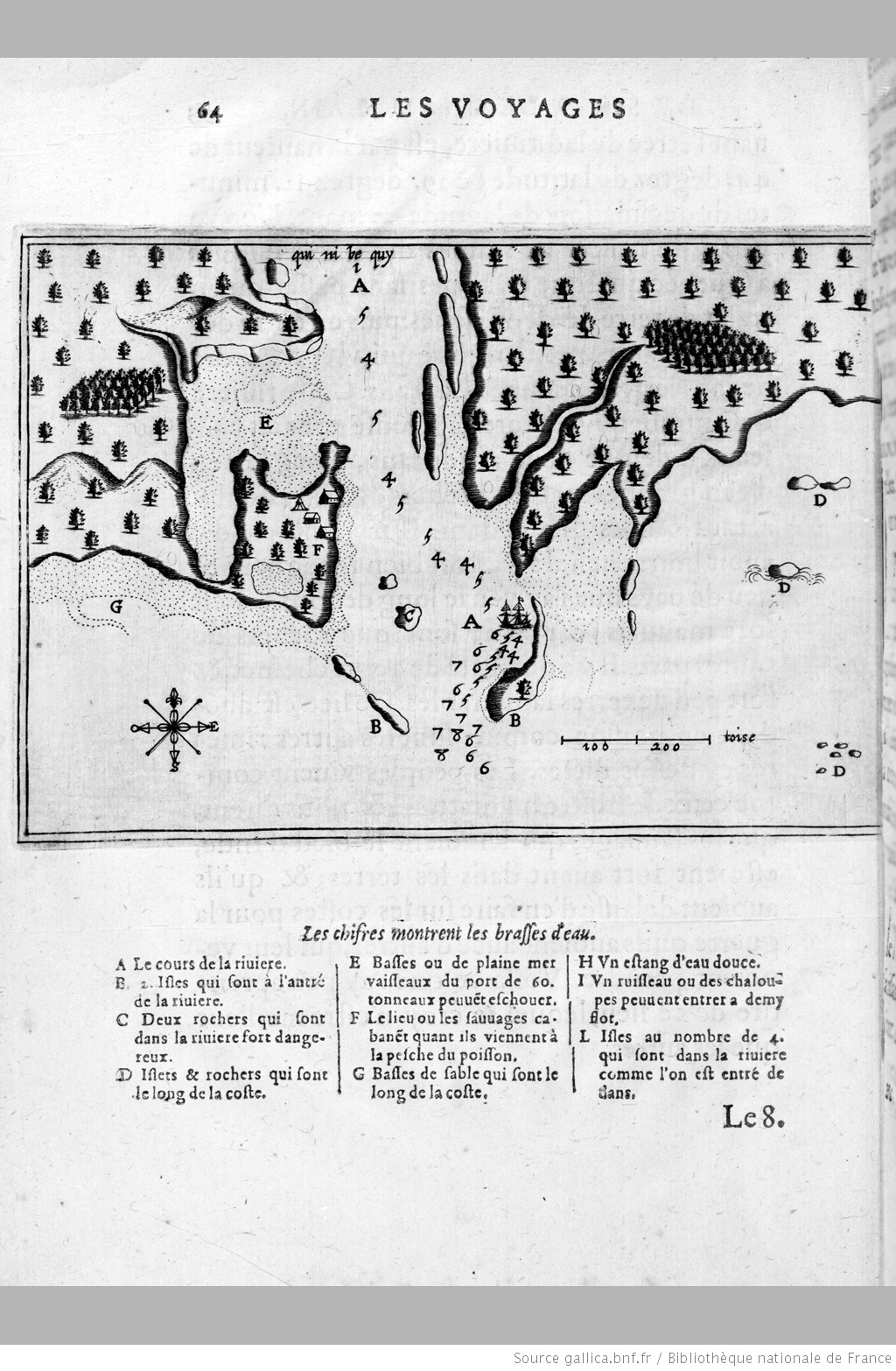
Champlain's 1607 chart of the Kennebec

In 1605, Samuel de Champlain, a French explorer, navigated the coast of what is now Maine, charting the land and rivers of what was then called New France, L'Acadie, including the Kennebec as far upriver as present-day Bath, as well as the St. Croix and Penobscot rivers. In the 1600s, the Abenaki village of Norridgewock was located along the Kennebec.

=== Shipbuilding ===
The English founded the Popham Colony along the Kennebec in 1607. The settlers built the Virginia of Sagadahoc, the first oceangoing vessel built in the New World by English-speaking shipwrights. An English trading post, Cushnoc, was established on the Kennebec in 1628.

Bath and other cities along the Kennebec were developed, and artisans founded shipyards that produced hundreds of wooden and steel vessels. Bath became known as the "City of Ships". The Wyoming, one of the largest wooden schooners ever built, was constructed there.

For parts of the 17th century, the Kennebec was the western boundary of Cornwall County, Province of New York.

Following the War of 1812 between the United States and Great Britain, the US enjoyed a lengthy period of expansion of international trade, which increased the demand for shipbuilding and stimulated the growth of maritime fleets. Many of those ships were built in Bath. In 1854, at the peak of this boom period, at least 19 major firms were building ships in Bath. Changes in the industry since the mid-20th century have resulted in the decline in US shipbuilding, as jobs moved offshore. The sole remaining shipyard in Bath is the Bath Iron Works, owned by General Dynamics; this is one of the few yards still building warships for the United States Navy. The USCGC Kennebec was named after this river.

=== Navigation ===
With waterways the most accessible travel routes, the Kennebec River served as an early trade corridor to interior Maine from the Atlantic coast. Ocean ships could navigate upstream as far as Augusta. The cities of Bath, Gardiner, Hallowell, and Augusta, and the towns of Woolwich, Richmond, and Randolph, all developed along this transportation corridor.

Upstream of Augusta, the timber industry used the river for log driving, to transport wooden logs and pulpwood from interior forests to sawmills and paper mills built along the river to use its water power. The city of Waterville and the towns of Winslow, Skowhegan, Norridgewock, Madison, Anson, and Bingham were all related to the lumber trade. The Maine Central Railroad and U.S. Route 201 were later constructed to make use of the flatlands along the river through these towns and cities.

=== Father Rale's War ===
England's 1710 conquest of Acadia brought mainland Nova Scotia under English control, but New France still claimed present-day New Brunswick and present-day Maine east of the Kennebec River. (The Kennebec River was also a border for the indigenous Native Americans and First Nations.) To secure its claim, New France established Catholic missions in the three largest native villages in the region: one on the Kennebec River (Norridgewock), one further north on the Penobscot River (Penobscot), and one on the Saint John River (Medoctec).

Abenaki warriors along the Kennebec resisted English encroachment by armed confrontations, in what American historians sometimes refer to as Father Rale's War (1722–1725). A Yankee militia raid on the Abenaki Indian mission village at Norridgewock in August 1724 crippled the Abenaki resistance, as they killed as many as 40 inhabitants, including women and children. They also killed and scalped Friar Sebastien Rasle, a 67-year old Jesuit priest, and scalped 26 of the dead Abenaki. Having plundered and torched the tribal village, the Yankee raiders destroyed the surrounding corn fields; they were paid bounties for the scalps. Some Abenaki survivors returned to the Upper Kennebec, but others took refuge with Penobscot allies or in Abenaki mission villages in French Canada.

=== Revolutionary War ===
Some 1,110 American Revolutionary War soldiers followed the route of the Kennebec during Benedict Arnold's expedition to Quebec in 1775.

=== War of 1812 ===
During the War of 1812, United States and British Canadian forces fought at the Battle of Hampden in Maine.

=== Ice industry ===
In 1814, Frederic Tudor began to establish markets in the West Indies and the southern United States for ice. In 1826, Rufus Page built the first large ice house near Gardiner, in order to supply Tudor. The ice was harvested during the winter from the river by farmers and others who were otherwise relatively inactive. They cut it by hand, floated the huge chunks to an ice house on the bank, and stored it until spring. Then, packed in sawdust, the ice was loaded aboard ships and sent to the South.

=== Flood of 1987 ===
On April 1, 1987, a combination of more than 6 feet (1.8 m) of melting snow and 4 to 6 inches (100 to 150 mm) of rain in the mountains forced the river to flood its banks. By April 2, 1987, the river had crested at the North Sidney, Maine USGS gage at 39.31 ft (11.98 m), 13.3 ft (4.1 m) higher than the previous record flood stage. At the flood's peak, the flow topped out at an estimated 232,000 cubic feet per second (6,600 m^{3}/s). It caused damage of about $100,000,000 (equivalent to about $283,000,000 in 2025), flooding 2,100 homes, destroying 215, and damaging 240 others. Signs of the flood can still be found in the towns and cities that line the river.

=== Whitewater rafting ===
In 1976, Suzanne and Wayne Hockmeyer, of Kennebec Whitewater Expeditions (now Northern Outdoors), pioneered whitewater rafting through the Kennebec gorge just below Harris Station Dam. Acknowledging the desire of young people for a space solely dedicated to kids, absent of adult gatherings and limiting constraints, Northern Outdoors, in 1998, opened Adventure Bound - Maine's only youth focused whitewater rafting company for kids and families.

In the early 21st century, Northern Outdoors and 22 other rafting companies in The Forks conduct rafting on the river daily from May through October. Four times per rafting season, Brookfield Power tests their generating turbines by releasing the maximum amount of water possible from Harris Station Dam. At 8000 cubic feet per second, these Kennebec River Turbine Tests are the biggest whitewater releases in Maine.

== Natural resources ==
Prior to the industrial era, the river contained many anadromous fish, in particular the Atlantic salmon. The exploiting of hydroelectric power in the region reduced the runs of such fish. The removal of dams on the river has been a controversial local issue in recent years. The removal of the Edwards Dam in 1999 has led to increased anadromous activity on the river.

== Dams ==
Before the river was dammed, it was navigable as far as Augusta.

=== Hydroelectricity ===
The following is a list of hydroelectric power stations on the Kennebec River.

Name	County	Coordinates	Owner	Date of FERC license issuance	Date of FERC license expiration	Total Capacity (MW)	Avg Annual Generation (MWh)	Year First Generator Online
Indian Pond Project (Harris Station Dam)	Somerset	45.4603°N 69.8662°W	Brookfield White Pine Hydro, LLC.	1/13/2004	10/30/2036	76.4	228,241	1954
Shawmut	Kennebec	44.6309°N 69.5835°W	Brookfield White Pine Hydro, LLC.	1/4/1981	1/30/2021	8.8	49,498	1913
Weston	Somerset	44.7636°N 69.7185°W	Brookfield White Pine Hydro, LLC.	11/24/1997	10/30/2036	12	80,341	1920
Wyman	Somerset	45.0697°N 69.9068°W	Brookfield White Pine Hydro, LLC.	11/24/1997	10/30/2036	72	389,210	1930
Williams	Somerset	44.9592°N 69.8705°W	Brookfield White Pine Hydro, LLC.	11/2/2017	4/29/2054	13	93,734	1939
Abenaki	Somerset	44.7921°N 69.8867°W	Eagle Creek Madison Hydro, LLC	7/24/2003	4/29/2054	20	96,767	1950
Anson	Somerset	44.7984°N 69.889°W	Eagle Creek Madison Hydro, LLC	7/24/2003	4/29/2054	9	43,545	1950
Lockwood	Kennebec	44.5484°N 69.6269°W	Merimil Ltd Partnership	3/3/2005	10/30/2036	2.4	11,048	1985
Hydro Kennebec Project	Kennebec	44.5639°N 69.6207°W	Hydro Kennebec LLC	10/14/1986	9/29/2036	15.4	80,882	1989

=== Removal of Edwards Dam ===
The Kennebec River before the construction of Edwards Dam was extremely important as a spawning ground for Atlantic fish. In 1837, the Edwards Dam was built across the Kennebec River, just shy of the limit of tidal influence. Made of timber and concrete, it extended 917 feet (280 m) across the river and 25 feet (7.6 m) high. Its reservoir stretched 17 miles (27 km) upstream, and covered 1,143 acres (4.63 km^{2}).

In 1999, the dam was removed, after the Federal Energy Regulatory Commission (FERC) determined that the ecological benefits of removing it outweighed the value of the electricity it produced, and refused the renewal of the dam license.

Despite several negative visual and environmental factors at first, the ecosystem is healing itself. Initially after the removal of the dam, barren riverbanks and muddy water were evident along the lower 17 miles (27 km) of the Kennebec. Introduced smallmouth bass will suffer from the re-introduced striped bass, which tend to feed on young smallmouth bass. An increase in raptor populations, such as ospreys, bald eagles, herons, cormorants, and kingfishers, is evident.

Human activities also benefited from the dam removal. The exposure of rapids and the return of native fish species allows many recreational activities, including canoeing, kayaking, whitewater rafting, and fishing.

=== The Nature Conservancy acquisition ===
In 2025, The Nature Conservancy announced the purchase of four dams on the river – Lockwood, Hydro-Kennebec, Shawmut, and Weston – which would eventually be removed to allow for greater upstream migration of fish.

== Statistics ==
The river drains 5,869 square miles (15,200 km^{2}), and on average discharges 5.893 billion US gallons (22,310,000 m^{3}) per day into Merrymeeting Bay at a rate of 9,111 cubic feet per second (258.0 m^{3}/s). The United States government maintains three river flow gauges on the Kennebec river. The first is at Indian Pond (45.51114°N 69.81080°W) where the rivershed is 1,590 square miles (4,100 km^{2}). Flow here has ranged from 161 to 32,900 cubic feet per second (4.6 to 931.6 m^{3}/s). The second is at Bingham (45°3′6″N 69°53′12″W) where the rivershed is 2,715 square miles (7,030 km^{2}). Flow here has ranged from 110 to 65,200 cu ft/s (3.1 to 1,846.3 m^{3}/s). The third is at North Sidney (44°28′21″N 69°41′09″W) where the rivershed is 5,403 square miles (13,990 km^{2}). Flow here has ranged from 1,160 to 232,000 cu ft/s (33 to 6,570 m^{3}/s). Two additional river stage gauges (no flow data) are in Augusta (44°19′06″N 69°46′17″W) and Gardiner (44°13′50″N 69°46′16″W); both of these gauge heights are affected by ocean tides.

== See also ==
- List of rivers of Maine
