= Edwards Dam =

- Edwards Dam removal, 1999
- Interactive map of Edwards Dam
- Location: Augusta, Maine, USA
- Coordinates: 44.3245°N 69.7714°W
- Opening date: 1837
- Demolition date: 1999

Dam and spillways
- Impounds: Kennebec River
- Height: 24 feet (7.3 m)
- Length: 917 feet (280 m)

Edwards Dam was a hydroelectric dam on the Kennebec River in the U.S. state of Maine. It was located in Augusta, Maine, about 40 miles (64 km) upstream from the Atlantic Ocean. Built in 1837 of timber and concrete, it was 917 feet (280 m) long and 24 feet (7.3 m) high. It is most famous for its removal in 1999, the first removal of a hydroelectric dam by the government against the wishes of the dam owner.

The dam originally had a fish ladder, but it was destroyed by a flood shortly after construction. It suffered catastrophic breaches in 1839, 1846 and 1855. In 1999, the Federal Energy Regulatory Commission (FERC) refused the renewal of the dam license due to excessive negative environmental impacts, and the dam was removed, freeing a 17-mile (27 km) stretch of the Kennebec River that had been submerged for 162 years.

== Geography ==
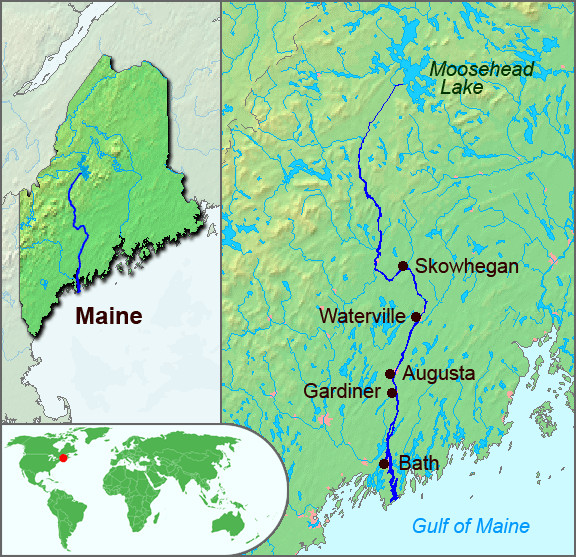
Map of the Kennebec River watershed.

The dam was located on the Kennebec River, a river that flows 150 miles (240 km) south from Moosehead Lake, draining roughly one-fifth of the state of Maine. Most of the river's watershed consists of smooth and lightly to moderately developed land, encompassing many small and large lakes. Notable cities along the river include Skowhegan, Waterville, Augusta, Gardiner, and Bath. The Kennebec is tidal as far north as Augusta.

== History ==
=== Pre-dam ===
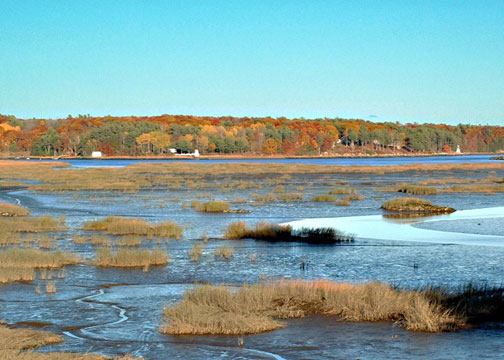
The Kennebec River's estuary returned to its original status as a spawning ground after the removal of Edwards Dam.

The Kennebec River before the construction of Edwards Dam was extremely important as a spawning ground for Atlantic fish. Its importance, at that time, could be compared to that of the Hudson River and Chesapeake Bay. The estuary at the mouth of the Kennebec was a congregation of islands and salt marshes that provided excellent spawning ground for young fish, namely sturgeon and salmon.

=== Construction and impacts ===
In 1837, the Edwards Dam was built across the Kennebec River, just shy of the limit of tidal influence. Made of timber and concrete, it extended 917 feet (280 m) across the river and 25 feet (7.6 m) high. Its reservoir stretched 17 miles (27 km) upstream, and covered 1,143 acres (4.63 km^{2}). Immediately after its construction, the population of spawning fish, including but not limited to, Atlantic salmon, river herring, striped bass and sturgeon, plummeted. The local fishing industry was the most heavily hit, and completely disappeared by 1867, 30 years after the construction of Edwards Dam. A series of fish ladders intended to help fish migrate past dams was installed, but were useless causing the anadromous fish population to practically vanish.

However, despite the disappearance of fish populations upstream of the dam, tiny remaining populations existed below the dam. A commercial eel fishery (similar to a fish farm) opened in response to the declining population of American eel.

=== Pollution ===
Edwards Dam was originally built to serve the needs of paper mills, which made use of the abundant lumber in the area. These paper mills severely polluted the river, which led to the demise of the last of the striped bass. Towns rose along the banks of the Kennebec in response to the construction of these paper mills. Eventually, by the 1950s, raw sewage flowed into the river in amounts excessive enough to create a strong stench. The river became choked by logs from logging operations upstream, creating stagnation. Oxygen levels in the water plunged, creating major fish kills in 1947, 1957, 1963, and 1965. Indeed, it was said that "the windows of the Maine State House near the river were kept shut during the hot summer months to keep out the river’s foul odor."

=== Removal ===
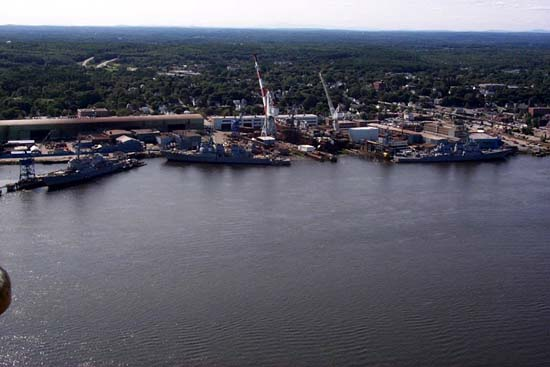
The Bath Iron Works was allowed to build a shipyard on the Kennebec in return for providing money to fund the removal of Edwards Dam.

The Edwards Dam's license expired in 1997, and the dam owners wished to renew it. However, the Federal Energy Regulatory Commission (FERC) refused grant their request. This was the first such incidence in the history of the United States and was linked to a 1986 Federal law that requires to "balance the environmental impact of a dam against the value of the electricity it produces" to be monitored by the FERC. Edwards Dam did not pass this requirement and FERC offered two choices to the dam owners:

- Remove the dam
- Spend $8.9 million to build a fish ladder and an additional $1 million to help repair the environmental damage.

Because the Edwards Dam did not serve any of the purposes of flood control, irrigation, or substantial hydropower production, there was much more purpose to bring it down. Less than one-thousandth of Maine's electricity needs, or 3.5 megawatts, depended on Edwards Dam. Only four people relied on income generated by the dam.

Bath Iron Works and the Kennebec Hydro Developers Group, owners of upstream dams, provided $7.25 million to remove the Edwards Dam. Upstream fish passage projects were postponed in return for this offer.

=== Removal process ===
Several stages were involved in the removal of the Edwards Dam. Crews constructed a gravel cofferdam, about 60 feet (18 m) long upstream of the Edwards Dam. They then dynamited the 60-feet of the dam it sheltered. This temporary dam was removed on July 1, 1999, which reduced the water level in the reservoir by fifty percent. Then, they constructed a 200 feet (61 m) cofferdam to enable the removal of another dam section in the same way. After the removal of this dam section, the Kennebec River returned to its original free-flowing status, the first time in 162 years. The remaining 657 feet (200 m) of the dam was removed manually. They used this debris to fill an intake for the hydroelectric powerhouse as well as fill to redevelop the dam site into a park.

=== Restoration ===
Initially after the removal of the dam, barren riverbanks and muddy water were evident along the lower 17 miles (27 km) of the Kennebec. Introduced smallmouth bass will suffer from the re-introduced striped bass, which tend to feed on young smallmouth bass. An increase in raptor populations, such as ospreys, bald eagles, herons, cormorants, and kingfishers, will be evident.

Human activities also benefited from the dam removal. The exposure of rapids and the return of native fish species allows many recreational activities, including canoeing, kayaking, whitewater rafting, and fishing. An estimated $48 million is generated annually just from increased sport fishing.

== See also ==
- List of dam removals in Maine
