= Howland Dam (Maine) =

- Location within Maine
- Country: United States
- Location: Howland, Penobscot County, Maine
- Coordinates: 45.2387600°N 68.656600°W

Dam and spillways
- Impounds: Piscataquis River

The Howland Dam is a hydroelectric dam on the Piscataquis River at its confluence with the Penobscot River in Howland, Penobscot County, Maine, USA. The Howland Dam was purchased by the Penobscot River Restoration Trust in 2010 from PPL Corporation, formerly Pennsylvania Power and Light, under an agreement reached several years earlier. A fish bypass was constructed around the dam in 2015.

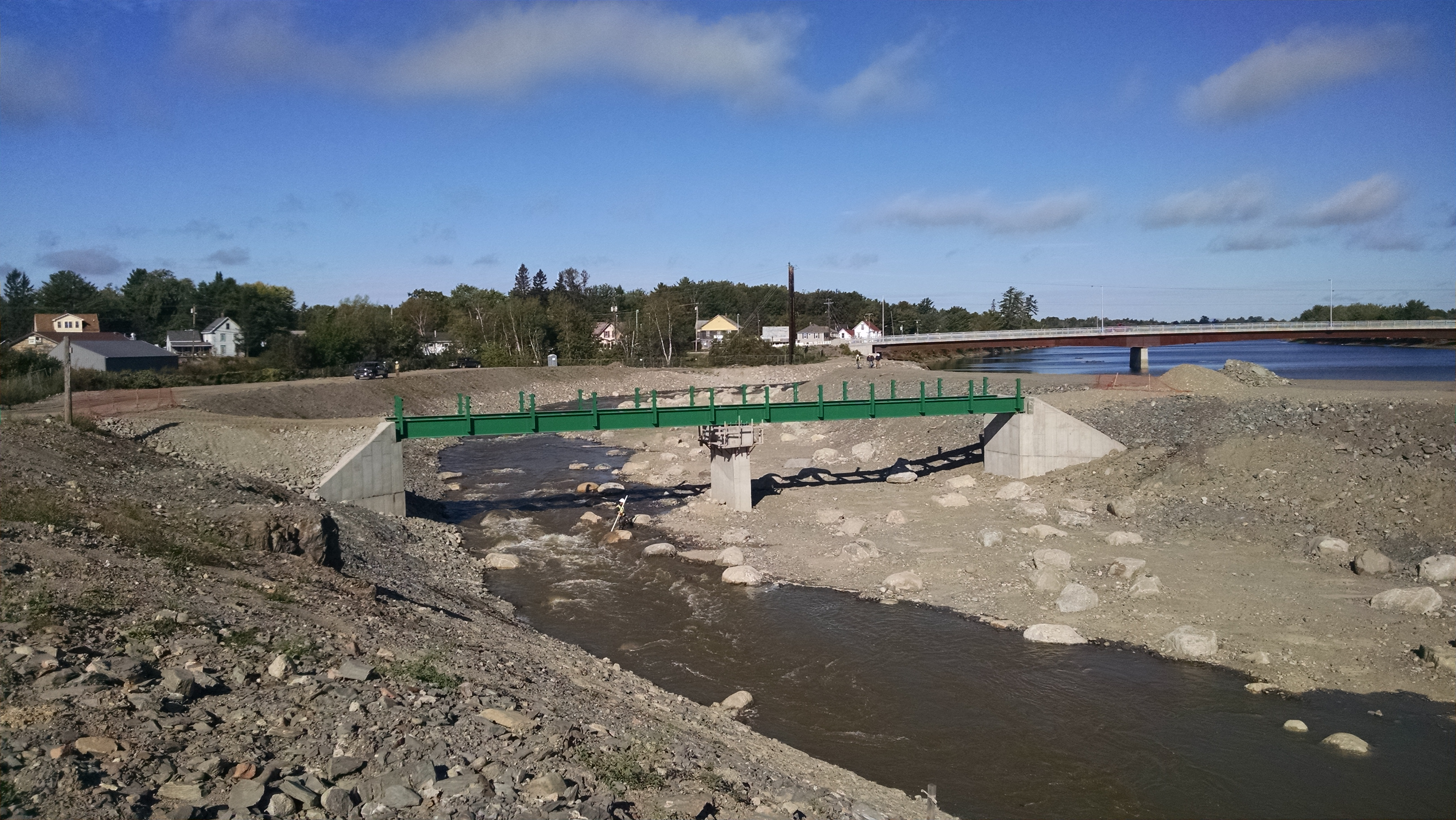
The fish bypass in 2015
