= Great Works Dam =

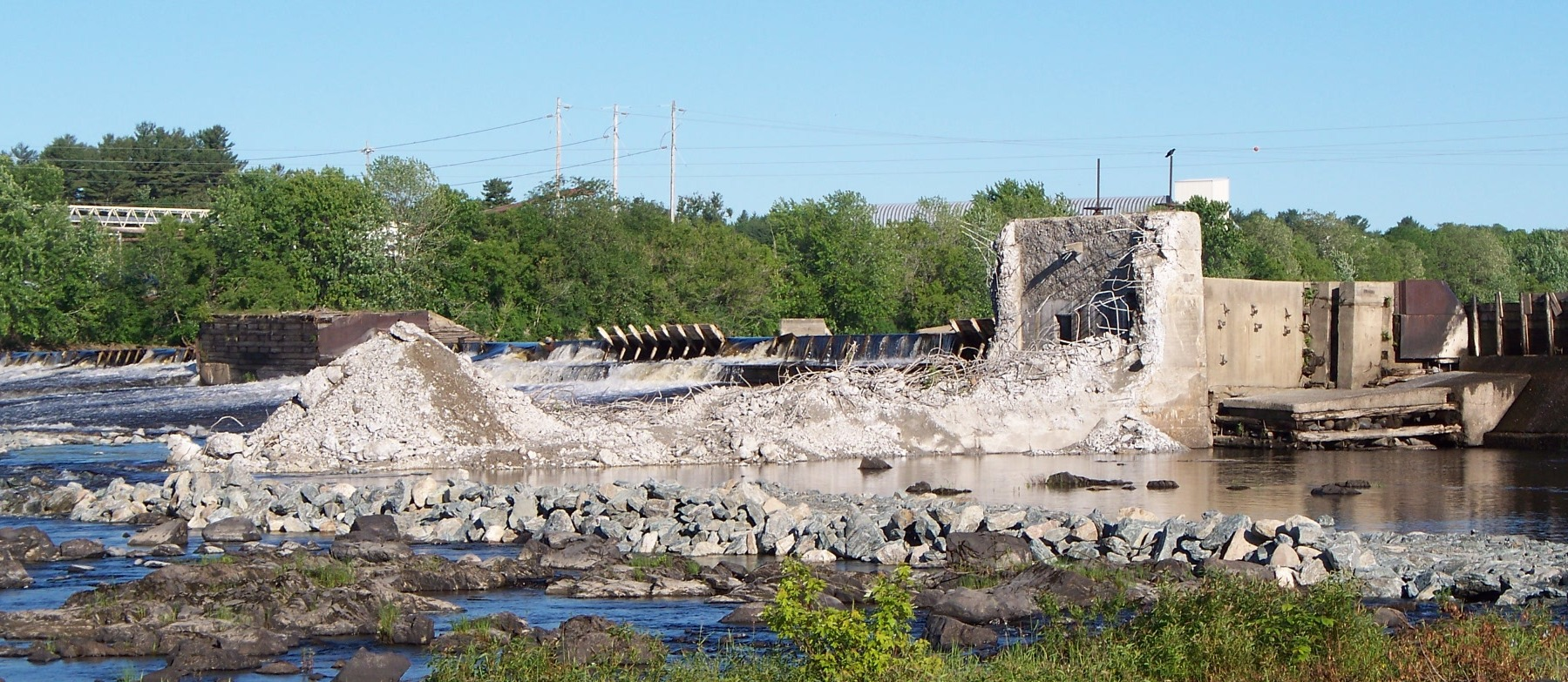
- Great Works Dam during week 1 of demolition

- Location within Maine
- Country: United States
- Location: Penobscot County, Maine
- Coordinates: 44.92046°N 68.63275°W
- Opening date: 1900
- Demolition date: 2012

Dam and spillways
- Impounds: Penobscot River
- Height: 20 ft (6 m)
- Length: 1,426 ft (435 m)

Power Station
- Decommission date: 2012
- Installed capacity: 8 MW

The Great Works Dam was a dam on the Penobscot River between Old Town and Bradley in Penobscot County, Maine, USA. The original Great Works Dam was constructed in the 1830s and replaced between 1887 and 1900. The dam was originally owned by the Penobscot Chemical Fibre Company and was acquired by Diamond International Corporation in 1968 along with the adjacent mill. The dam and powerhouse were sold several more times, and in 2010 the Penobscot River Restoration Trust bought the dam from PPL Corporation based on an agreement that was signed in 2004. On June 11, 2012, deconstruction of the dam began as a part of an extensive project involving four dams to restore eleven species of sea-run fish to the Penobscot River.

== See also ==
- List of dam removals in Maine
