= Penobscot River =

River in the U.S. state of Maine

Penobscot River Pαnawάhpskewtəkʷ
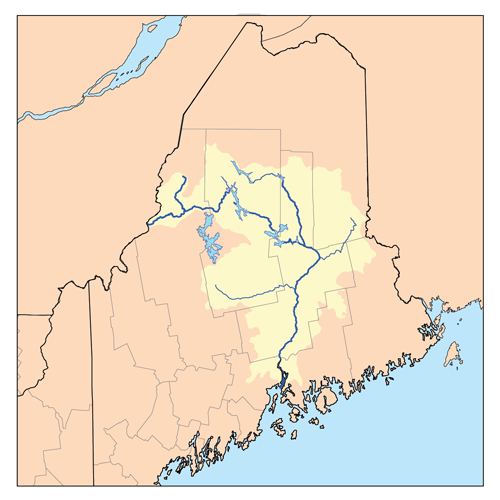
- The Penobscot River watershed

Location
- Country: United States

Physical characteristics
- Source
  - location: Maine
- Mouth
  - location: Penobscot Bay
  - coordinates: 44°26′N 68°50′W
  - elevation: sea level
- Length: 109 mi (175 km)
- Basin size: 8,610 mi^{2} (22,300 km^{2})
- Discharge
  - average: 12,080 cu ft/s (342 m^{3}/s)

Basin features
- Tributaries
  - left: East Branch Penobscot River, Mattawamkeag River
  - right: West Branch Penobscot River, Piscataquis River

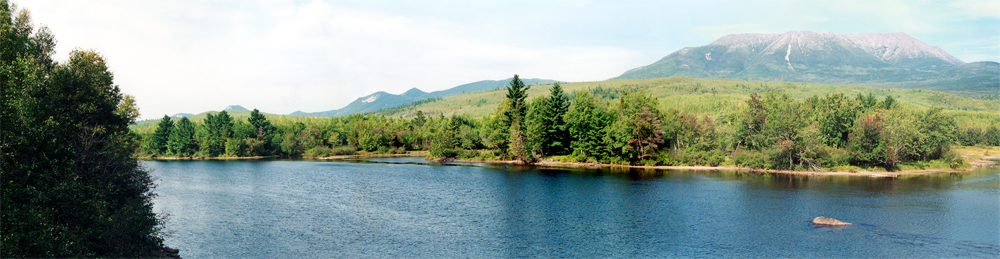
Panorama of the West Branch Penobscot River near Abol Falls, Maine

The Penobscot River (Abenaki: Pαnawάhpskewtəkʷ) is a 109-mile-long (175 km) river in the U.S. state of Maine. Including the river's West Branch and South Branch increases the Penobscot's length to 264 miles (425 km), making it the second-longest river system in Maine and the longest entirely in the state. Its drainage basin contains 8,610 square miles (22,300 km^{2}).

It arises from four branches in several lakes in north-central Maine, which flow generally east. After the uniting of the West Branch with the East Branch at Medway (45°36′14″N 68°31′52″W), the Penobscot flows 109 miles (175 km) south, past the city of Bangor, where it becomes navigable. Also at Bangor is the tributary Kenduskeag Stream. It empties into the Atlantic Ocean in Penobscot Bay. It is home to the Penobscot people who live on Indian Island, and considered to be their lifeblood.

== History ==
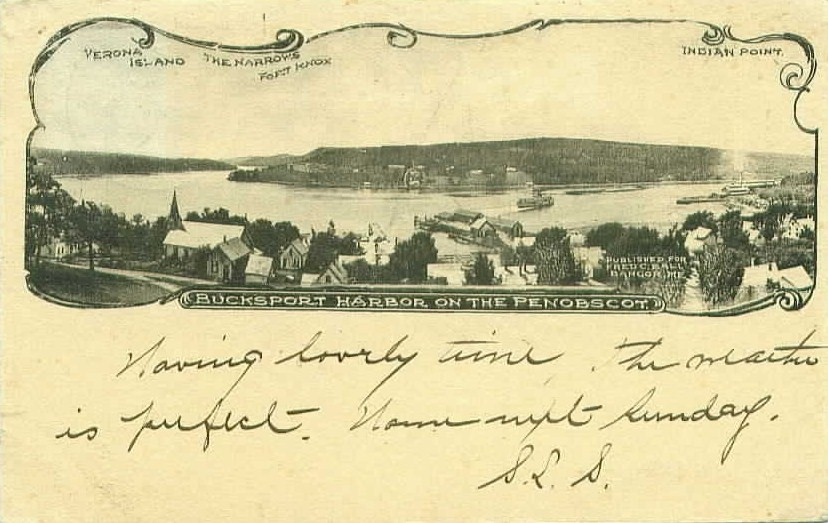
Bucksport Harbor, about 1905

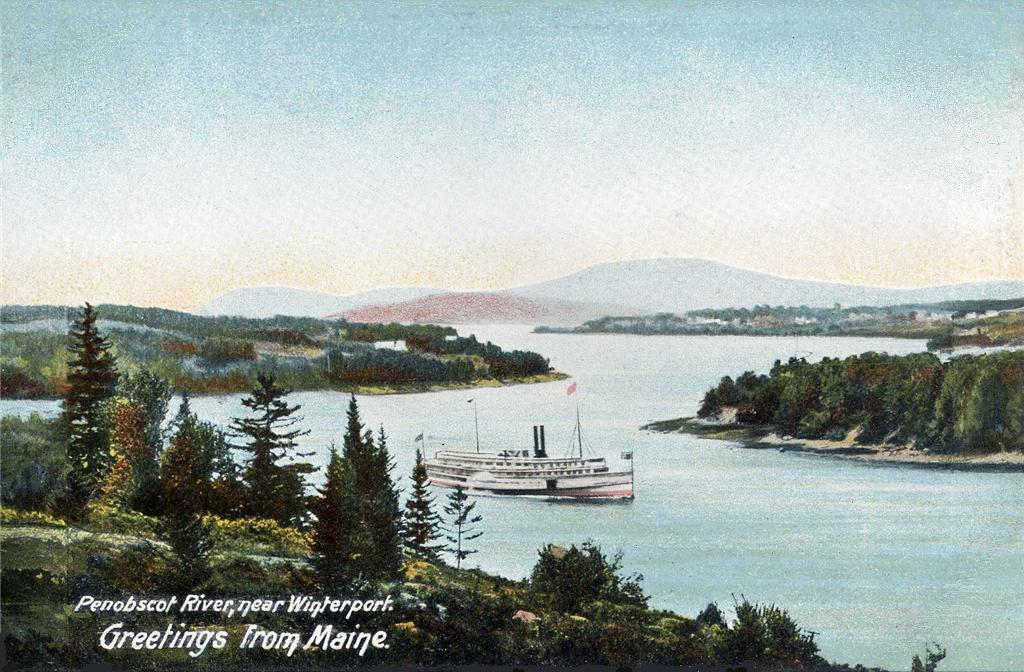
View near Winterport about 1906

=== Norumbega ===
From a sketch he made of what he called the "Riviere de Norenbegue" the river has been identified as the Penobscot though the matter was hotly contested by some nineteenth century antiquarians, who argued that the name should be identified with their own river or region.

=== Navigation ===
The Penobscot River was an early trade corridor to interior Maine from the Atlantic coast. Ocean ships could navigate upstream to Bangor. The cities of Rockland, Belfast, Brewer and Bangor, and the towns of Rockport, Camden, Northport, Searsport, Stockton Springs, Castine, Bucksport, Frankfort, Winterport, Orrington, and Hampden developed adjacent to the Penobscot River estuary. The river upstream of Bangor became an important transportation corridor for log driving to bring wooden logs and pulpwood from interior forests to sawmills and paper mills built to use water power where the city of Howland and the towns of Veazie, Orono, Old Town, Milford, Passadumkeag, West Enfield, Lincoln, Winn, Mattawamkeag, Medway, and Millinocket developed.

=== European colony ===
The first European known to have explored the river was Estêvão Gomes in 1524, a Portuguese navigator who sailed in the service of Spain in the 1520s. The Spaniards, led by Gomez, were the first Europeans to make landfall in what is now Maine, followed by the Frenchman Samuel de Champlain in 1605. A few years later French Jesuit priests came among the Penobscot people as missionaries and converted them to Catholicism. The French settlement of Pentagouet, now Castine, was founded at the point where the river becomes Penobscot Bay, and the Penobscot people made a permanent settlement at Indian Old Town, Maine on an island above the head of navigation, around the Catholic mission. Throughout the first half of the 17th centuries, these were likely the only permanent settlements on the river, although the Penobscots considered the entire river and bay their hunting ground and maintained other seasonal villages along its banks.

In 1669, the Mohawk made several raids from the west that were very destructive to the Penobscot people. During Father Rale's War, New England settlers from Massachusetts also sent periodic raiding parties to the Penobscot, destroying the primary native village in 1723. In a treaty of 1752, however, Massachusetts laid claim to the entire Penobscot watershed, and in 1759 the Pownall Expedition, led by Governor Thomas Pownall, established Fort Pownall on Cape Jellison in what is now Stockton Springs. This signaled the end of French influence over the Penobscot, and the incorporation of the Penobscot River valley into New England.

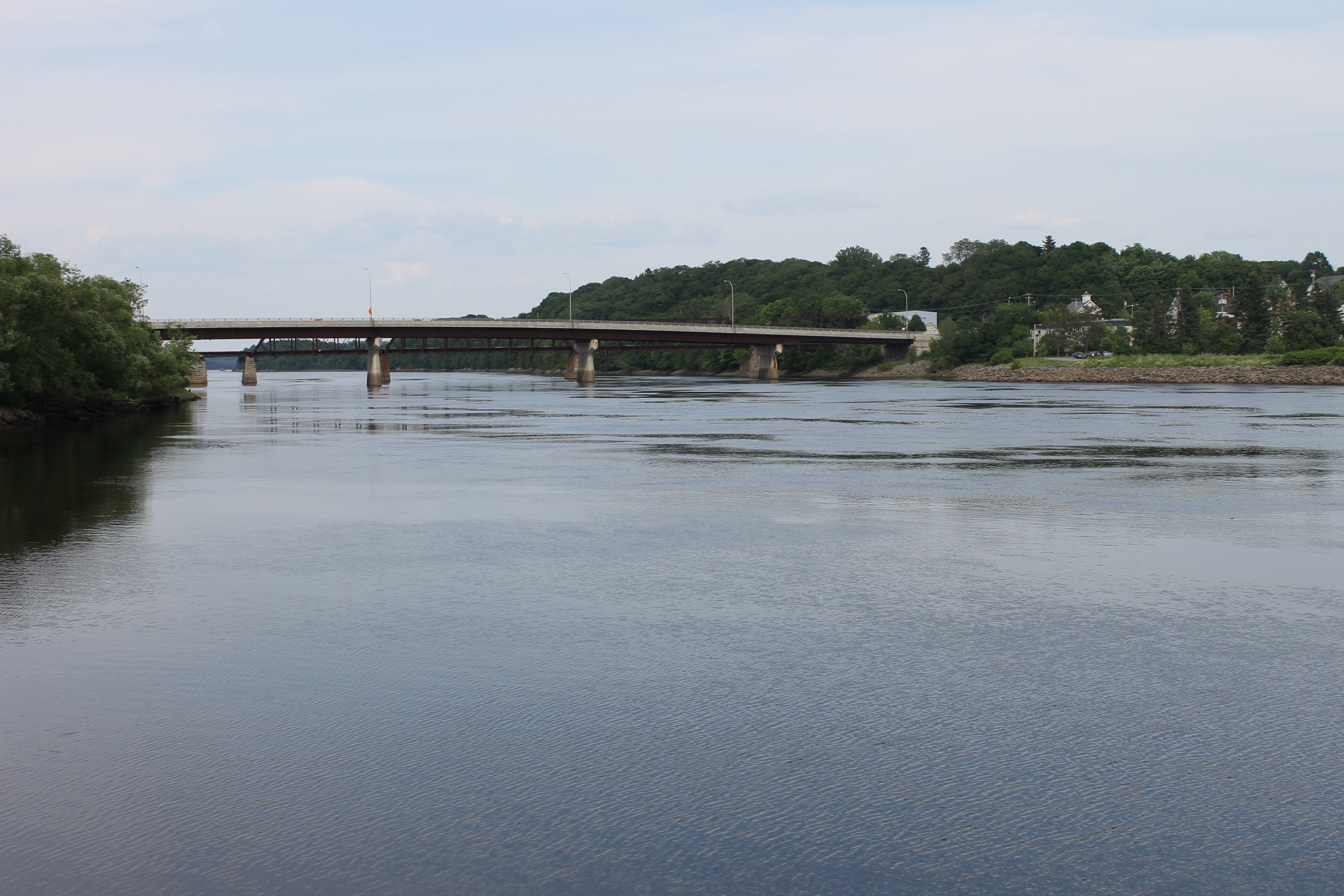
The Penobscot at Bangor, Maine

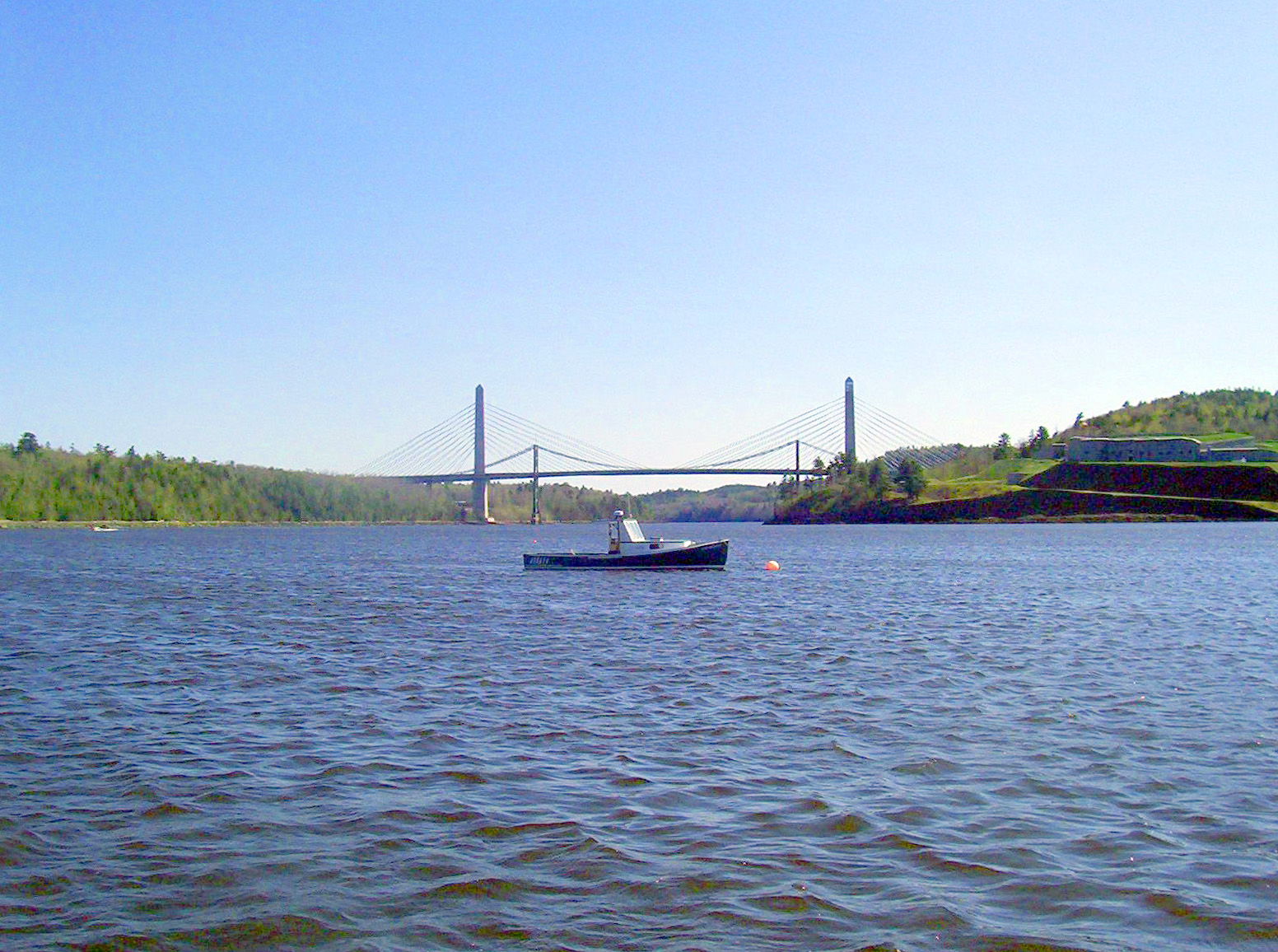
Penobscot Narrows and Fort Knox in 2007

=== British colony ===
The first permanent settler from British North America on the river was Joshua Treat (1726–1802), who was initially the armorer and translator at Fort Pownall. His oldest son, Joshua Treat Jr., built a log house and sawmill at Marsh Bay in what is now Frankfort, and other members of their extended family, joined by additional settlers from Massachusetts and New Hampshire, pushed ever further up-river, eventually restricting the Penobscot people to Indian Island (Old Town, Maine), the present Penobscot Indian Reservation.

=== American Revolution and modern history ===
During the American Revolutionary War, the river and bay were the site of the disastrous 1779 Penobscot Expedition, where an entire American fleet was destroyed in a botched attempt to retake Maine from the British. During the War of 1812, the British again invaded Maine and defeated an American force at the Battle of Hampden, sacking the town of Bangor in the process. To prevent this from happening a third time, and because the nearby boundary between the United States and British Canada was still contested into the 1840s, the Federal government in 1844 began constructing a huge granite fort, Fort Knox, opposite the town of Bucksport, near the mouth of the river. The fort never fired a shot in anger, but remains one of the Penobscot's major man-made landmarks.

In the 19th century the river was a conduit for the transport of logs from Maine's Great North Woods, to be sawed into lumber at mills around Old Town and Orono, and transported on ships from Bangor, at the head of tide. (The average high tide at Bangor is 13 feet (4 m) as of 2009.) A secondary economic use made of the river late in the century was as a source of sawed ice for urban markets.

In 1931 the Waldo-Hancock Bridge was opened to carry US Route 1 across the river at the Penobscot Narrows between Prospect, in Waldo County, and Verona Island just below Bucksport.

During the 20th century, lumbering was largely supplanted by papermaking, in the form of large wood pulp and paper mills located all along the river from Millinocket and East Millinocket in the north, to South Brewer and Bucksport in the south. Wood pulp and paper mills create dioxins as a byproduct of the chlorine bleaching process in making paper. This substance was discharged from seven mills located close to the Tribal community of Penobscot people, along the Penobscot river. Dioxins, which are highly potent toxic chemicals that may cause cancer and other health problems, were being poured daily into this adjacent river, the Penobscot. Rebecca Sockbeson, a Penobscot, is quoted saying that her people have survived on fish from this river, but "now we are dying from it." She continued on to say that "neither dioxin nor cancer is indigenous to the Penobscot people, however they are both pervasive in my tribal community." As an Indigenous community trying to maintain traditional subsistence living and eating such as fishing or foraging, their way of life and their physical bodies are unequally burdened by issues of water quality and pollution. The health and survival of the Penobscot people is further threatened by the impact that persistent organic pollutants (POPs) have on reproduction and the health of their children. The 2015 collaborative report, The Penobscot River and Environmental Contaminants: Assessment of Tribal Exposure Through Sustenance Lifeways, confirms through a four-year quantitative study that these unequal burdens and harmful level of toxins are very real threats and realities faced by the community's indigenous people. Sockbeson concludes that a treaty is required to ensure that "the breast and spoon we feed our babies with is not filled with cancer, diabetes, learning disabilities, and attention deficit [disorder]."

Paper making was an industry which was responsible for a large amount of the contamination in the Penobscot River. The problem was traced back to HoltraChem, a chemical plant located in Orrington, Maine HoltraChem was responsible for producing many of the chemicals used in papermaking, such as chlorine and mercury. Beginning in 1967, HoltraChem dumped up to 13 tons of mercury into the Penobscot river rather than safely disposing of the chemicals. These chemicals were dumped both legally and illegally, resulting in mass contamination of the river. HoltraChem was the company behind 11 massive chemical spills into the Penobscot River in only 12 months, from 1998 to 1999. Because the Penobscot Tribe is a river based tribe, their culture is directly tied to the River which has become polluted. Through hunting, trapping, fishing, and many other traditional practices, the culture is sustained. Without the continuation of these activities, their culture will begin to become lost. Due to the pollution of the Penobscot river, the waterways, plants, and environment which the nation relies on for their way of life have become contaminated. The Penobscot Nation dates back to more than 9,500 years, and because of the constant pollution, their way of life is soon to be lost. June Sapiel, an activist and member of the Penobscot Nation, is quoted describing the importance of the river, saying "Our water is sacred. That was our highways and our byways... It's our relative." Pollution has been gathering in the Penobscot River for at least 150 years, making the consumption of various fish toxic to those who eat them, such as members of the Penobscot nation. In 1987, recommendations for limited fish consumption were given to the Penobscot Nation. It is recommended that members of the Penobscot Nation eat no more than a single serving of fish from the Penobscot River each month.

The development of cheap hydropower also attracted other types of light manufacturing, like textiles and shoes.

=== 21st century ===
In the 21st century, with the continuing decline of the Maine paper industry, and the divestiture of its woodlands, the Penobscot watershed has become more and more associated with recreational use (fishing, hunting, boating, and tourism) and less with manufacturing.

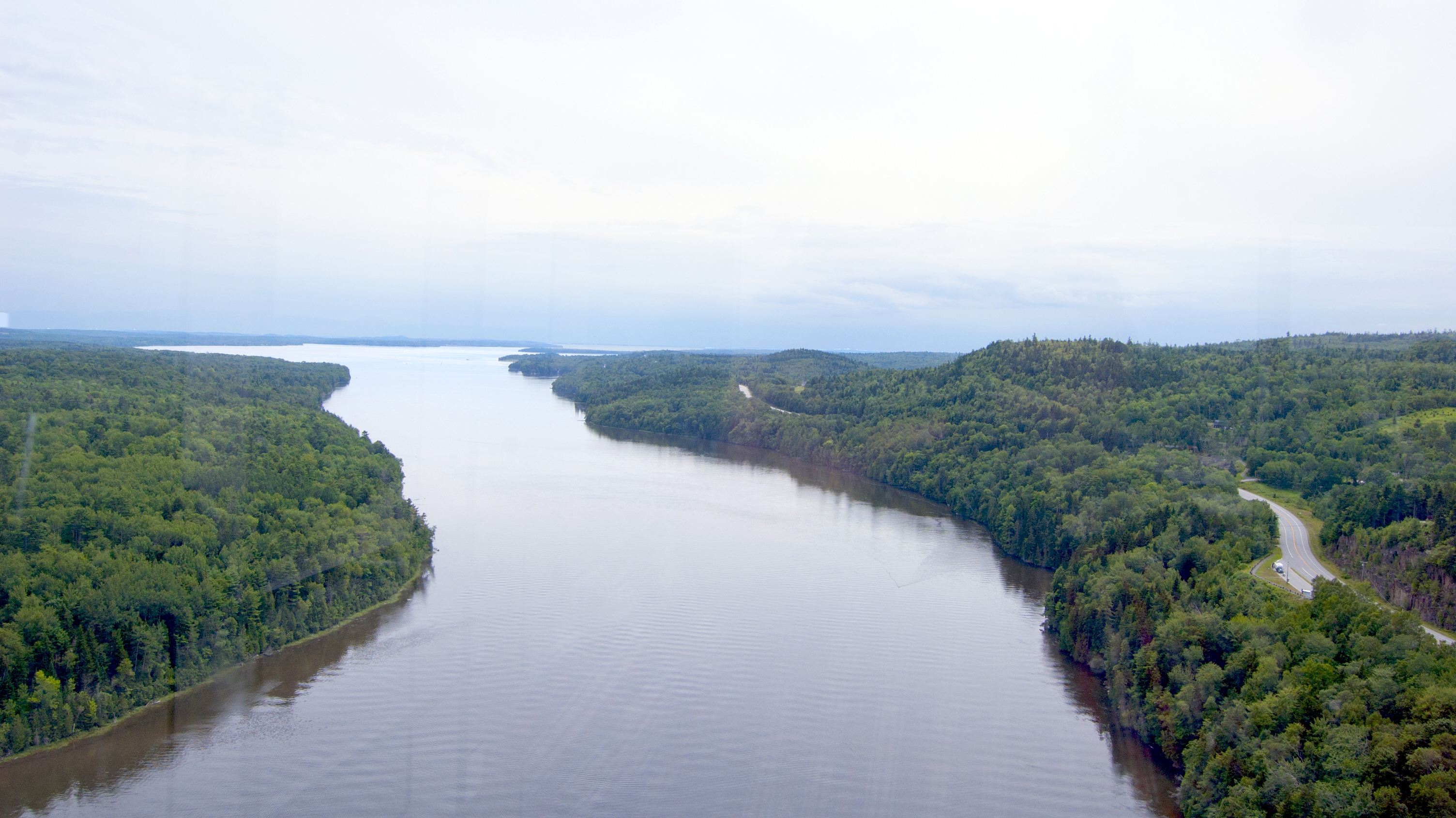
The river viewed from the Penobscot Narrows Bridge Observatory as it empties in Penobscot Bay (2013)

In 2001, the Old Town Paper Mill won a case against the Penobscot Nation, under the Maine Freedom Access Act, where they were given access to documented tribal correspondence with the EPA in regards to the regulations of water quality. It was announced in 2007 that a study would be conducted by the EPA in regards to the Penobscot river system. This study would examine the levels of contamination from PCBs, mercury, and dioxin in various culturally important species.

In 2006 the Waldo-Hancock Bridge was closed and replaced by the Penobscot Narrows Bridge, a 2,120 foot long, $85,000,000 structure with 135 feet between the water and the bridge's deck, and the original bridge was subsequently demolished in 2013. A bridge observatory in the support tower on the Waldo County side 420 feet above the surface of the river is open to the public, the only bridge observatory in the United States, and only one of four bridge observatories in the world. The two 447 foot tall granite towers of the bridge are patterned after the Washington Monument which had been largely built with granite quarried from nearby Mt. Waldo.

As part of the Penobscot River Restoration Project, several dams were modified or removed to improve river conditions. Demolition began on the Great Works Dam in 2012, and the Veazie Dam in 2013. A fish ladder was installed at Milford Dam. A fish bypass was installed at Howland Dam. This led to an increase in the number of Atlantic Salmon, Shad, and other fish species in the river.

The Old Town Paper Mill, located in Old Town, Maine, has had a long history of environmental issues. The mill has a long history of environmental concerns and has been cited for numerous violations of environmental regulations, including air and water pollution, hazardous waste management, and chemical spills. The mill has also been the subject of numerous citizen complaints and legal actions over the years. On October 7, 2020, it was discovered that the Nine Dragons (ND) Paper Mill in Old Town, Maine had spilled chemicals into the Penobscot River. The spill was discovered after elevated pH levels were discovered in the water, in which ND decided to investigate further. It was found that over 30,000 gallons of chemicals, which were used for pulping, had spilled into the river due to a ruptured sewer line. ND Paper Mill reported the spill to the Department of Environmental Protection who assisted in cleanup and repairs to the damaged sewer line. The DEP conducted an investigation into the incident, and found that the spill was caused by a failure in the mill's equipment. It was also found that the mill had failed to properly train employees on the correct way to handle and store hazardous materials. The spill occurred when a pipeline carrying a mixture of chemicals, including hydrogen peroxide and sodium hydroxide, ruptured, releasing an estimated 15,000 gallons of the mixture into the Penobscot River. The spill created a large plume of foam and smoke, and local residents reported a strong chemical odor in the air. The spill was leaking into the Penobscot River from approximately September 29 to October 7, 2020. It was also noted that the leak was occurring intermittently for about 56 days during 2021 before being discovered. In response to the issue, ND Paper replaced multiple failed floor drains and about 400 feet of steel piping for the sewer system. Since these issues, the company has decided to complete more routine maintenance and inspections in order to prevent future occurrences. Alongside routine inspections, shut-off valves were installed along with alarms to detect the flow of any chemicals which might come through. Finally, unused pipes were sealed off, as they were helping the chemicals to flow through into the river. While ND Paper has taken steps to improve its environmental performance since the spill, concerns remain about its impact on the environment and the local community. The Penobscot River is an important resource for fishing, boating, and a food source, and the spill posed a threat to the river's ecosystem. The chemicals released in the spill can cause significant harm to aquatic life, and can also contaminate drinking water supplies. The spill also had a significant impact on the local economy, as many businesses rely on the river for their livelihoods. The lasting effects that this spill has had on the Penobscot Nation has caused them to lose one of their main food sources, as it has been recommended that less fish be consumed from the river.

The introduction of mercury into the Penobscot River is extremely dangerous and was described as "imminent and substantial endangerment to public health and the environment," as this watershed is a main source of shellfish and fish alike. Mercury is a neurotoxin which is extremely dangerous to ingest, especially for young, developing children or fetuses. Because of this, the elderly, children, and pregnant women must be extremely careful about ingesting anything which could potentially contain mercury. A court ordered study was completed by the company Mallinckrodt, which over the course of nine years found that the Penobscot River had levels of mercury which were up to 20 times higher than the surrounding areas. From this study, high levels of mercury were detected in wildlife as well, such as ducks, fish, and snapping turtles. Because of these extremely high levels of mercury which were discovered, the Agency for Toxic Substances and Disease Registry (ATSDR), recommend that members of the Penobscot Indian Nation, (PIN), limit consumption of fish and snapping turtles caught in the river to 1-2 meals per month. Due to this recommendation, the overall consumption rates of fish have decreased for the Penobscot Nation The pollution of the Penobscot River has taken a very large toll on the amount of food and resources which can be collected from the river. Mauian Dana, a Tribal Ambassador, said "[T]he pollution has taken a toll on the vitality of our people. We have sustenance fishing rights but cannot live on the fish. When I was a child, the river was thick with foam, had an odor at all times, and if you swam in it, your clothing would be stained and skin would break out."

The Penobscot River Restoration Trust was a nonprofit organization consisting of many organizations including the Penobscot Nation, Maine Audubon, and many more. From this, the Penobscot River Restoration Project was created, with the goals of a cleaner, healthier river, supporting the PIN culture as well as traditions, and restoring the ecosystem for native plants and animals. The project was discontinued in 2016, however they were able to help the river's ecosystem and the health of the areas around it. The Penobscot Nation has been fighting big polluters to help restore the Penobscot River back to its original condition. This is being done through lawsuits against big pollution companies, restoring water quality, and removing dams. In 2018, the Penobscot River was voted to become a citizen of the Penobscot Nation, as the river is viewed as a relative to the tribe, with its own fundamental rights. Member of the Penobscot Nation John Banks highlighted the importance and value of the river, saying "It was our life source. For thousands of years, it provided a means for the tribe to sustain itself. And our history, traditions, and cultural identity are very much intertwined with it," In 2021, a cleanup plan was set into place 22 years after a lawsuit was filed against Mallinckrodt US LLC. This cleanup plan consists of long term monitoring as well as cleaning up the area, along with providing funding to projects for communities and environments which have been affected by this pollution.

In 2022, after more than a half century of mercury contamination, Maine's longest river is finally being cleaned up.

== River flow and gauges ==
The United States government maintains three river flow gages on the Penobscot river. The first is on the East Branch in Grindstone (an unincorporated settlement approximately 10 miles (16 km) south of Stacyville) (45°43′49″N 68°35′22″W) where the rivershed is 1,086 square miles (2,810 km^{2}). Flow here has ranged from 400 to 1,300 cubic feet per second (37 m^{3}/s). The second is in West Enfield (45°14′12″N 68°38′57″W) where the rivershed is 6,671 square miles (17,280 km^{2}). Flow here has ranged from 4,410 to 9,660 cubic feet per second (274 m^{3}/s). The third is in Eddington (45°14′12″N 68°38′57″W), 0.4 miles (0.64 km) downstream from the Veazie Dam where the rivershed is 7,764 square miles (20,110 km^{2}).

== Angling ==
Angling, including fly fishing, is common on the river. The West Branch is known as a world class landlocked salmon river, while the East Branch is known for its smallmouth bass fishery. In 2008, the Atlantic Salmon Commission opened the main stem of the river to catch and release fly fishing for Atlantic salmon.

The West Branch is home to landlocked salmon and Brook Trout. There are many deep pools within the river, due to the many slate ledges, making the river ideal for fishing from shore, though there are still areas that are good for canoe fishing. With the Ripogenus Dam by Chesuncook Lake, the West Branch is able to sustain the large landlocked salmon found there, with twelve miles of heavy rapids, deep runs, large pools, and slower moving water in some sections. Baxter State Park is located to the north.

Some of the river's rapids are class IV or even V, making this one of the roughest rivers in the area, and attracting whitewater rafters. Until 1971 the West Branch was a main thoroughfare for the Great Northern Paper Company to sluice its logs to its mill in Millinocket, Maine. In 1971 Great Northern opened the Golden Road (Maine) for transporting the logs. The road parallels the river. The paper industry has been greatly diminished and the Millinocket mill was torn down in 2013. The Golden Road, still a private road, continues to be used by logging trucks and also people using the Penobscot.

May to June are usually when mayflies begin their first hatch. Caddisflies also start their massive hatch around this time, but it can extend into the fall at times. Stoneflies tend to hatch throughout the season. In the West Branch, fishermen are often required to use a variety of different techniques.

== Popular culture ==
- Henry David Thoreau published an account of travelling up the Penobscot from Bangor in 1846, to climb Mount Katahdin, in his work Ktaadn.
- Author Stephen King placed his fictional town of Derry, Maine on the Penobscot.
- The Penobscot is also featured in the film adaptation of the Tom Clancy novel The Hunt for Red October as the location chosen in which to hide the Soviet Typhoon class submarine from spy satellites.
- Part of the Annie Proulx novel Barkskins takes place in Penobscot Bay.
- In Margaret Atwood's The Testaments, Baby Nicole and Aunt Victoria escape Gilead to Canada on the Penobscot River.

== See also ==
- List of rivers of Maine
- Waldo–Hancock Bridge
- Penobscot Narrows Bridge and Observatory
- Fort Knox (Maine)
