= Rebecca Sockbeson =

Native American scholar (born 1972)

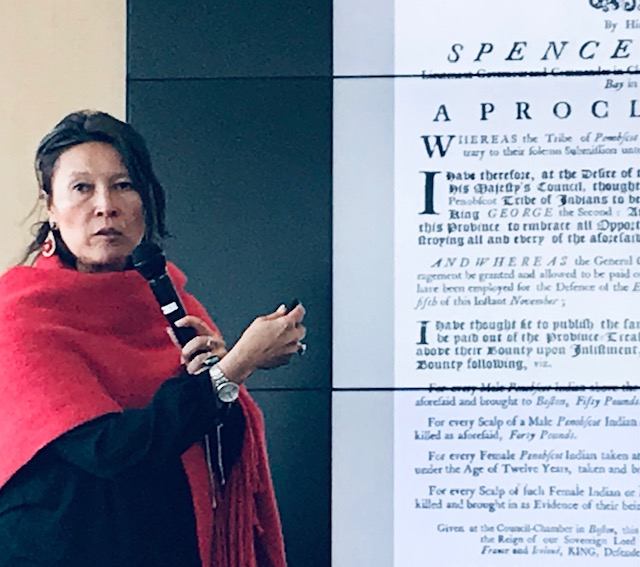
- Born: 1972 (age 53–54)
- Education: University of Maine (BA), Harvard University (Ed), University of Alberta (PhD)
- Writing career
- Subjects: Indigenous peoples' rights, Education policy

Rebecca Sockbeson is a Wabanaki scholar and activist in the field of Indigenous Peoples' education.

Sockbeson is a member of the Penobscot Indian Nation of Indian Island and Wabanaki Confederacy of tribes located in Maine, United States and the Maritime provinces of Canada. She is the eighth child of the Elizabeth Sockbeson clan, the auntie of over 100 Waponahki & Stoney Sioux youth and the mother of three children who are also of the Alexis Nakota Sioux First Nation of Alberta. She is the niece of State of Maine Senior Advisor on Tribal Affairs Donna Loring. Sockbeson is an associate professor of Indigenous Peoples Education focusing on Indigenous knowledge and knowledge mobilization, Aboriginal healing through language and culture, anti-racism and decolonization with the Department of Educational Policy Studies in the Faculty of Education and the associate director of Intersections of Gender at the University of Alberta. Sockbeson's poem written in honor of missing and murdered Indigenous women, “Hear me in this concrete beating on my drum”, was a winning entry in the Word on the Street Poetry Project in 2018 and is sandblasted on a downtown Edmonton sidewalk as part of a permanent public art installation.

== Education ==
Sockbeson earned a BA from the University of Maine, received a master's degree in education from Harvard University, and went on to confer her PhD in Educational Policy Studies at the University of Alberta, specializing in Indigenous Peoples' Education. Her doctoral study, Cipenuk Red Hope: Weaving Policy Toward Decolonization & Beyond, engages with how Indigenous ways of knowing and being can inform policy development.

== Professional activities ==
In 1997, Sockbeson was hired as coordinator of Multicultural Programming and Native American Student Affairs at the University of Southern Maine.

In 2017, Sockbeson and Cora Weber-Pillwax were awarded a Social Sciences and Humanities Research Council Insight Grant for the research project, Indigenous knowledge mobilization: A purposeful collaboration between Indigenous communities and higher education.

Sockbeson's delivery at a university-wide reconciliation event is part of a 2017 documentary film Journey Towards Reconciliation.

From 2018 to 2020, Sockbeson served as visiting Libra Scholar for the University of Maine College of Education to support efforts to educate Maine pre-service teachers toward compliance with the Maine Wabanaki Studies Law, also known as LD 291.

Sockbeson was a historical consultant for the film Bounty, about the Spencer Phips Proclamation.

=== Recognition ===
In 2013, Sockbeson and her Indigenous colleagues were awarded a University of Alberta Human Rights Teaching Award for their role in coordinating and teaching Alberta's first compulsory course in Aboriginal Education, EDU 211: Aboriginal Education & the Context for Professional Development.

== Activism and policy work ==
As a young woman Sockbeson was inspired by stories of the American Indian Movement and Wounded Knee Sockbeson organized a grassroots organization, IRATE, Indigenous Resistance Against Tribal Extinction.

In 1999, Sockbeson spoke against dioxin pollutants in her community to international negotiators of a treaty to eliminate or ban the most widespread persistent organic pollutants (POPs): “Unless you take action to eliminate dioxin and other persistent pollutants, there will be no Penobscots living on the islands by the end of the next century.” She also spoke out against environmental genocide in the film Drumbeat for Mother Earth (Bullfrog Films).

In 2000, Sockbeson, along with other Waponahki people, provided testimony to the Maine Legislature in support of LD 2418, “An Act Concerning Offensive Names.” She shared firsthand experiences of being a hate crime victim in grade school to illustrate why the “S” word is harmful to Indigenous peoples.

Sockbeson was one of several Waponahki people who lobbied and testified for the implementation of Maine Law LD 291: An Act to Require Teaching of Maine Native American History. The Law passed in 2001 and went into effect in 2004. She served as Penobscot Representative on the Wabanaki Studies Commission from 2001–2003 to ensure fulfillment of the Wabanaki Studies Law legislation, help develop curricular resources, and submit a report outlining recommendations for LD 291 compliance.

In 2014, Sockbeson moderated a teach-in on Treaty rights, Indigenous education, and the First Nation Education Act at the University of Alberta, hosted by I: SSTRIKE, Indigenous Students Strengthening Treaty Relationship through Indigenous Knowledge and Education. In 2016 Sockbeson joined other tribal members in ceremony to pray for the thousands of water protectors at Standing Rock who were challenging the DAPL. Sockbeson moderated a teach-in in 2018 “Educating for the Justice of Indigenous People; A Teach-In,” aimed at the Truth and Reconciliation Commission of Canada and its "Calls to Action & Reconciliation" and calling attention to the not-guilty verdicts in the deaths of Colten Boushie and Tina Fontaine.

In 2018, Sockbeson was interviewed by the Edmonton Journal regarding Indigenous students academic performance, she stated that racism is the main reason Indigenous students leave school early and said the term “achievement gap” puts students, not the system, under the microscope when, “It’s really a teacher development gap”.

In response to Alberta's controversial hiring of C.P. Champion as curriculum adviser in 2020 the CBC interviewed Sockbeson, who said, “It's not just a matter of political will — governments and schools have a legal obligation to ensure Canadian children are adequately educated in the history of First Nations people. Hiring someone who doubts the experiences of residential school survivors is reckless. The earlier that we can introduce to children the truth about Canada's history, the sooner we can account for what has happened and ensure it doesn't ever happen again".

== Publications ==
- Sockbeson, R. (2019). Maine Indigenous Education Left Behind: A Call for Anti-Racist Conviction as Political Will Toward Decolonization. Journal of American Indian Education, 58(3), 105–129. DOI: 10.5749/jamerindieduc.58.3.0105
- Sockbeson, R., Weber-Pillwax, C., Sinclair, J., Louis, C., & Auger, S. (2018). Red Hope Pedagogy. Cultural and Pedagogical Inquiry, 10 (2), 50–57.
- Sockbeson, R. (2017). Indigenous Research Methodology: Gluskabe's Encounters with Epistemicide. Postcolonial Directions in Education, 6 (1), 1-27.
- Sockbeson, R. (2017). Waponahki Anti-Colonial Resistance in North American Colonial Contexts: Some Preliminary Notes on the Coloniality of Meta-Dispossession. In D. Kapoor (Ed.), Against Colonization and Rural Dispossession (1st ed., pp. 28–42). London, UK: Zed Books.
- Sockbeson, R. (2016). Honored and Thriving: The Squaw Law and Eradication of Offensive State Place-Names. American Indian Culture and Research Journal, 40 (2), 123–138.
- Sockbeson, R. (2016). Reconciliation in the Face of Epistemicide. Canadian Journal of Native Education, 38 (2).
- Sockbeson, R. (2011). Cipenuk red hope: Weaving policy toward decolonization & beyond. PhD dissertation, University of Alberta.
- Sockbeson, R. (2009). Waponahki intellectual tradition of weaving educational policy. Alberta Journal of Educational Research, 55 (3), 351–364.
