= Charles Norman Shay =

American writer (1924–2025)

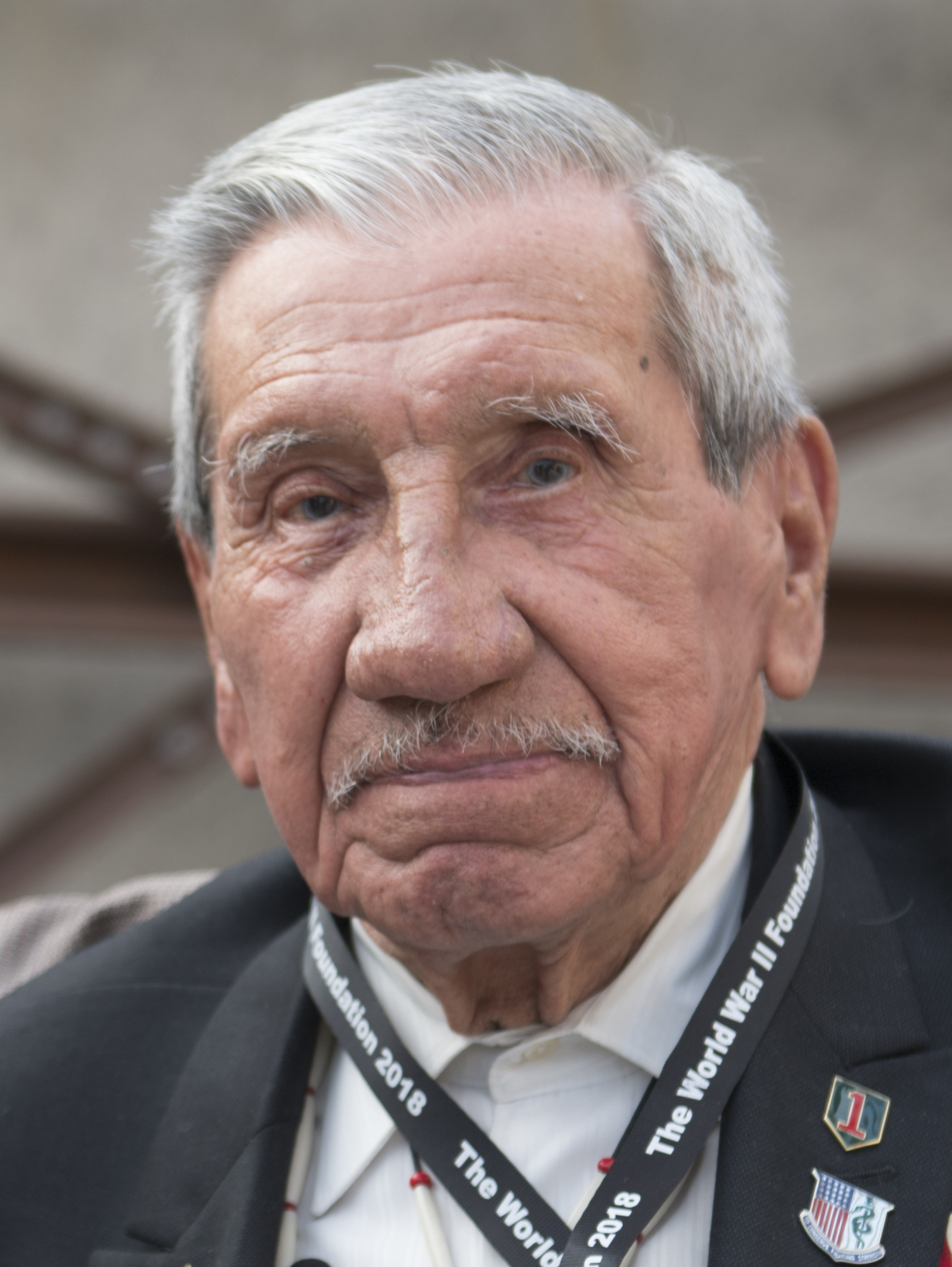
- Shay in 2018
- Born: June 27, 1924; Bristol, Connecticut, U.S.
- Died: December 3, 2025 (aged 101); Thue et Mue, Calvados, France
- Spouse: Lilli Shay (died 2003)
- Military career
- Allegiance: United States
- Rank: Master Sergeant
- Units: 1st Infantry Division; 3rd Infantry Division
- Conflicts: World War II; Battle of Aachen; Battle of Huertgen Forest; Battle of the Bulge; Omaha Beach; Korean War
- Awards: Silver Star, Bronze Star (3)

Charles Norman Shay (June 27, 1924 – December 3, 2025) was an American Penobscot tribal elder, writer and decorated veteran of both World War II and the Korean War. Along with a Bronze Star and Silver Star, Shay was also awarded the Legion of Honour, making him the first Native American in Maine with the distinction of French chevalier. He was instrumental in the re-publishing of an 1893 book by his grandfather, Joseph Nicolar: The Life and Traditions of the Red Man. Shay later wrote an autobiography, Project Omaha Beach: The Life and Military Service of a Penobscot Indian Elder, that detailed his time abroad in the military.

== Early life ==
Shay was born in Bristol, Connecticut on June 27, 1924. He was a direct descendant of French military officer Jean-Vincent d'Abbadie de Saint-Castin.

== World War II ==
Shay was drafted into the military in 1943 at the age of 19. He was selected for training as a medical technician and learned basic surgery skills. Shay joined the Medical Detachment of the First Division's (the "Big Red One") 16th Infantry Regiment and was attached as a platoon medic to Fox Company. Shay was present during the first wave of the landing of Omaha Beach on D-Day, where he pulled several struggling soldiers from the rising tide and saved many immobilized wounded from drowning. He also served at the Battles of Aachen, Huertgen Forest, and the Ardennes (Battle of the Bulge).

Shay was later attached to a reconnaissance squadron moving into the small farming village of Auel near the Sieg River in Germany. The squadron encountered about 20 German soldiers accompanied by a tank with an 88mm weapon, and were forced to surrender. The squadron was then marched 50–60 miles, moving only by night, to the POW camp Stalag VI-G. Shay was held there until April 1945, when American forces captured the camp.

== Post–World War II and Korea ==
After making it home safely, Shay was unable to find work, like many other veterans after the war. He re-enlisted and was stationed in Vienna, Austria, serving as a medic with a Military Police Battalion. While stationed there he met Lilli [Rosa] Bollarth, and they married on March 21, 1950. When the Korean War broke out later that year, Shay joined the 3rd Division's 7th Infantry Regiment as a medic and was shipped to Japan. A few months later, his regiment went into battle in Korea and he served again as a combat medic. Shay was promoted to master sergeant and awarded the Bronze Star with two oak leaf clusters.

== Retirement and death ==
Shay and his wife Lilli lived together in Vienna, visiting Shay's original hometown on Indian Island in Maine in the summers. Charles and Lilli officially relocated to Indian Island in 2003, but Lilli fell ill almost immediately. She died shortly after.

Shay renovated the two-story wooden "Teepee" on Native Island that his aunt Lucy Nicolar Poolaw and her Kiowa Indian husband Chief Bruce Poolaw built as a novelty shop and to sell Lucy's handmade baskets. Shay restored the site as a small family museum.

Shay was an elder member of the Penobscot tribe of Maine. He lived until 2018 in the community of the reservation where he spent his childhood on Penobscot Island, opposite Old Town, Maine. In his retirement, Shay played a significant role in the installment of National Native American Veterans Day.

Shay moved to Bretteville-l'Orgueilleuse, France in 2018. During the COVID-19 pandemic in 2020–21, he was among the few veterans able to attend commemorations, coming from his home nearby. He represented many of his comrades who were unable to make the trip amid restrictions.

He turned 100 on June 27, 2024, and died on December 3, 2025, at the age of 101.

== Project Omaha Beach ==
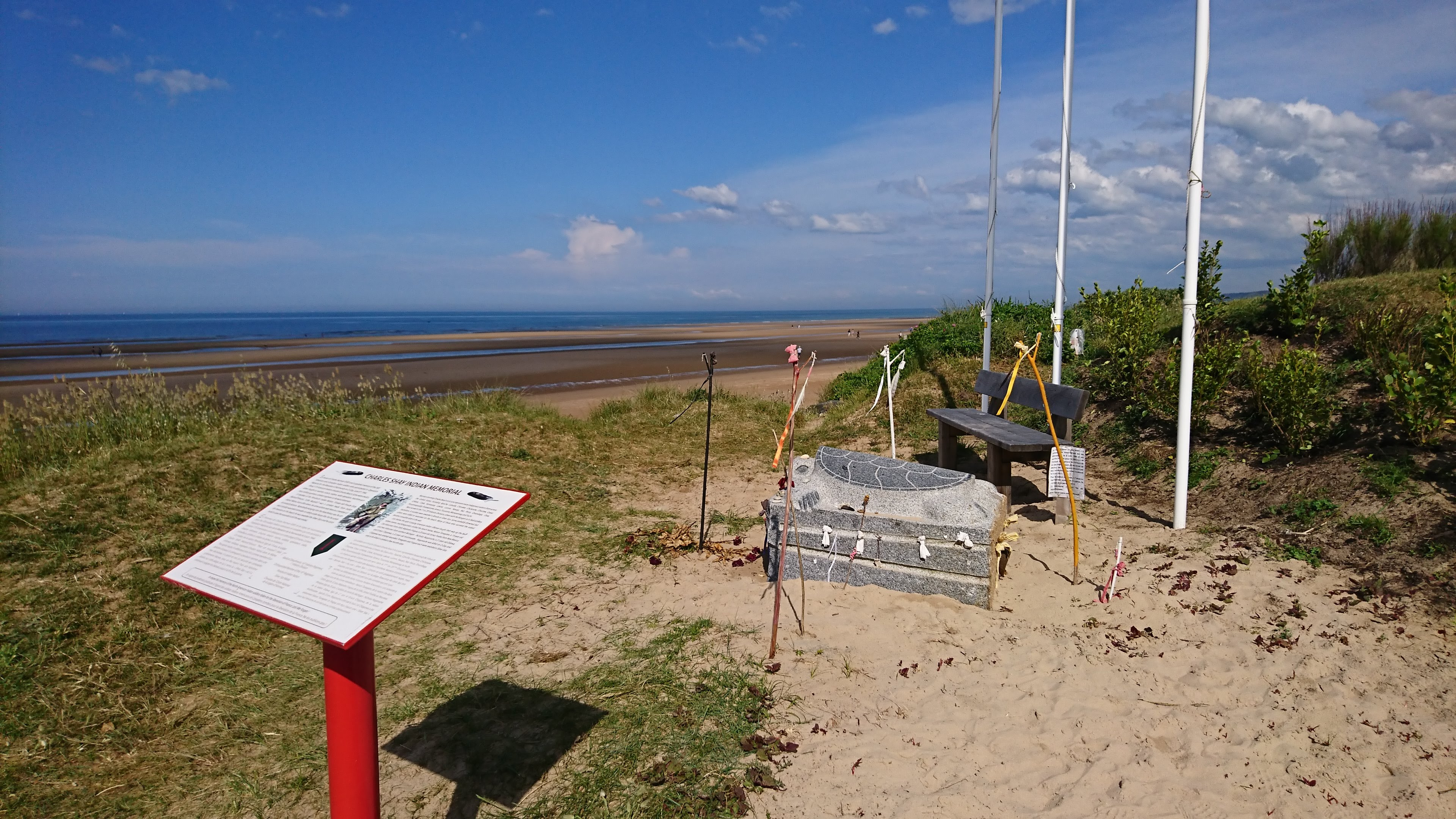
Charles Shay Indian Memorial on Omaha Beach.

In spring of 2007, Shay along with Harald E. L. Prins and his wife Bunny McBride, both of Kansas State University, planned a trip back to Europe so Shay could visit past battle sites and comment on his experiences. The group was awarded grants to fund the journey from both the Maine Humanities Council and the First Division Museum in Wheaton, Illinois.

Prins, McBride, and Shay visited Normandy, Mons, Aachen, Hurtgen Forest, the Ardennes, and Auel. The trip was documented and filmed for future reference and in order to shed light on the experiences of American Indian soldiers in World War II. In the 2012 book Project Omaha Beach: The Life and Military Service of a Penobscot Native American Elder, Shay narrates the journey in the form of letters to his deceased wife Lilli as part of his autobiography. Soon after returning to his home at Panawahpskek (Natives Island), Maine, Shay was personally inducted into the Legion of Honour as a Chevalier by President Nicolas Sarkozy at the French Embassy in Washington, DC.

A year later, in 2008, Shay was inducted as a Distinguished Member of the 16th Infantry Regiment in a special ceremony at Fort Riley, Kansas, home base of the 1st Infantry Division. In 2009, he spearheaded the official establishment of June 21 as Native American Veterans Day in Maine, the first state in the US to do so. Eight years later, he was invited to ceremonially inaugurate a large granite turtle sculpture at the "Charles Shay Indian Memorial," a small park in the dunes overlooking Omaha Beach.
