= Bunny McBride =

American writer

Carol Ann (Bunny) McBride is an American author of a wide range of nonfiction books on subjects ranging from cultural survival and wildlife conservation to Native Americans. Her most recent ethnohistory book is Indians in Eden: Wabanakis and Rusticators on Maine's Mt.Desert Island (Down East Books, 2009). Throughout the 1970s and 1980s, she regularly published her poetry and essays in the Christian Science Monitor, and reported on her travels in China, West Africa, East Africa, and northern Europe. Her articles appeared in various US newspapers and magazines, including the Washington Post, Boston Globe, Chicago Tribune, International Wildlife, Travel & Leisure, Sierra, Yankee Magazine, Downeast, and Reader's Digest. From 1981 on, she was actively involved in oral history and community development projects with Micmac Indians in Maine.

An award-winning author, Bunny has taught ethnographic writing and organized creative writing workshops. In 1999, she received an official commendation from the Maine State Legislature in recognition of the "tremendous contribution" made in her writings about Maine Indian women, in particular Penobscot dancer Molly Spotted Elk. The Maine Historical Society selected this acclaimed biography as one of the one hundred most "notable" books written in or about Maine (2000).

McBride has served as a visiting professor in cultural anthropology at Principia College, Elsah, Illinois (1981–1992) and the Salt Center for Documentary Field Studies, Portland, Maine (1995). She has curated several museum exhibits, including the national-award-winning exhibit Indians and Rusticators (2012) at the Abbe Museum, Bar Harbor, Maine. She serves on a number of boards, including the Women’s World Summit Foundation, based in Geneva, Switzerland (2003- ). An adjunct lecturer of cultural anthropology at Kansas State University (1996- ), she now lives in Bath, a town on the coast of Maine, with her husband, Dutch anthropologist Harald E.L. Prins. They have co-authored a study on the indigenous cultural history of Mount Desert Island, as well as the book Indians in Eden, and are collaborating on a life history of a Penobscot Indian combat veteran of World War II and the Korean War. They have also collaborated on other books, articles, and museum exhibits.

McBride was born in Washington, D.C., on April 9, 1950. She is the daughter of retired CBS Executive and NBC anchor Robert J. McBride and Cynthia Martin. Having majored in art and English literature at Michigan State University (BA 1972), McBride continued her graduate studies in art (painting and sculpture) at Boston University, and completed a master's in cultural anthropology at Columbia University (1980).

== Selected publications ==
- "Senegal’s Door of No Return." Pp. 190–93. In Destinations: Uncommon Trips, Treks and Voyages. (S. Thomas, ed.) The Christian Science Monitor, 1989.
- Our Lives in Our Hands: Micmac Indian Basketmakers. Nimbus Publishing & Tilbury House, 1990.
- Molly Spotted Elk: A Penobscot in Paris. U Oklahoma Press, 1995.
- National Audubon Society Guide to African Wildlife. (with Peter Alden et al.). Knopf, 1995.
- "Walking the Medicine Line: Molly Ockett, a Pigwacket Doctor." (with H.E.L. Prins). Pp. 321–47. In Northeastern Indian Lives. (R. Grumet, ed.) U Massachusetts Press, 1996.
- "The Spider and the WASP." Pp. 407–430. In Reading Beyond Words: Context for Native History. (J.S.H. Brown and E. Vibert, eds.) Broadview Press, 1996; 2nd edition, 2003.
- Women of the Dawn. (U Nebraska Press, 1999) ♣Friends of American Writers Literary Award, 2000
- "Lucy Nicolar: The Artful Activision of a Penobscot Performer." Pp. 141–59. In Native Women’s Lives. (T. Perdue, ed.) Oxford University Press, 2001.
- Cultural Anthropology: The Human Challenge. (with W. Haviland et al.) Wadsworth, 2005, 2008, 2011, 2013.
- "Princess Watahwaso: Bright Star of the Penobscot." Pp. 87–132. In Of Place and Gender: Women in Maine History. (M.F. Weiner, ed.). U Maine Press, 2005.
- Essence of Anthropology. (with W. Haviland et al.) Wadsworth, 2006, 2009, 2012.
- Asticou's Island Domain: A Cultural History of Wabanaki Peoples at Mount Desert Island, 1600-2000. (with H.E.L. Prins) Washington DC: National Park Service, US Dept. of the Interior, 2007. See Acadia National Park - Wabanaki Ethnography (U.S. National Park Service)
- Indians in Eden: Wabanakis and Rusticators on Maine's Mt.Desert Island. (with Harald E.L. Prins) Camden: Down East Books, 2009
- By the Light of the Moon: Reflections on Wholeness of Being. Wisbee Creek Press, 2014.
- From Indian Island to Omaha Beach: The D-Day Story of Charles Shay, Penobscot War Hero. (with Harald E.L. Prins) Wisbee Creek Press, 2019. ISBN 978-0578497273
- "Of Bombs and Beaches: Leon Kroll's Mosaic Ceiling at Omaha Beach.” France-Amérique, June 2019. See Of Bombs and Beaches: Leon Kroll’s Mosaic Ceiling at Omaha Beach

== Sources ==
- The Mirror of Maine: One Hundred Distinguished Books that Reveal the History of the State and the Life of its People. (F.F. Sprague, ed.) U Maine Press and the Baxter Society, 2000.
- Contemporary American Authors. (2005)
- Reference Encyclopedia of the American Indian (12th Edition, 2006)
- Edgar A. Beem, "Hunting and Gathering: Writer Bunny McBride Helps Maine's Native American Women Unearth Their Lost History." Boston Globe Sunday Magazine (June 3, 2001)
