= Maine Indian Newsletter =

The Maine Indian Newsletter was a monthly newsletter published independently from 1966 to 1972 in Gardiner, Maine and Freeport, Maine. While the exact address is not listed, the office was on Pine Street in Freeport. All of the articles archived by Dawnland Voices have Pine Street listed as the place to send submissions and money.

The newsletter was produced by Penobscot and Indian Island resident ssipsis, also known as Eugenia T. Thompson, as well as edited by various volunteers on the small staff. The newsletter sought to inform and “serve the Indians in Maine”. Because target readership was Native Americans, the newsletter's content contained items of interest, such as news, fictional stories, advertisements, and art, relevant to native peoples.

== Background ==
The Maine Indian Newsletter originated during the Red Power movement, a period in the 60s and 70s of reinvigorated Native American political effort to mobilize their communities into action against the perceived wrongs against their sovereignty by state and federal governments, dating back to initial European colonization. The front cover of the 1972 Maine Indian Newsletter references this social movement as a theme of the newsletter with a handwritten Red Power slogan.

One aspect of the Native American movement to gain full land and self-government involved combating mainstream news by developing their own news sources. Many native peoples resented white mainstream accounts of recent events in the early 70s like the Wounded Knee incident, which they argued unfairly represented American Indians. Because of the increase in Native American periodical publications, this period also marked the inception of the American Indian Press Association, an organization brought about in part to hold native journalism to more rigorous editorial standards as well as work towards developing a national native press that could compete with mainstream news representations of Indian affairs.

At the publication time of later issues of Maine Indian Newsletter, the Penobscot people, joined with the Passamaquoddy tribe, were actively suing the State of Maine over what they argued were violations of 200 year-old land treaties, in that Maine had denied the tribes their right to 12 million acres. Many of the Newsletter issues reflect concerns with Penobscot land and sovereignty rights. Two years after the final publication of Maine Indian Newsletter, the courts reached their verdict in favor of the Penobscot and Passamaquoddy tribes.

== Content ==
Newsletters were published monthly and distributed to readers via mail. Each newsletter ran about 16-20 pages long and was produced in black and white on a typewriter with each article hand-typed by ssipsis, the editor.

Unlike some tribal nation newsletters, which are disseminated by the tribal government, the Maine Indian Newsletter was privately produced. The style and format of the newsletter was similar to many American Indian independent publications at the time: short, monthly tabloids produced inexpensively by a small staff that resembled “in formal and technical quality many small-town weeklies”. Informal and sometimes humorous editor's notes commonly featured alongside articles in each issue.

Content ranged from local Indian Island reservation news, such as births, deaths, and tribal government meeting minutes, to national events and legislation pertinent to Native Americans. Other information covered included stories, jokes, comics, letters to the editor, and native business advertisements. Articles, especially those in the earlier publications, were often recycled stories about serious issues from other Indian and non-Indian newspapers across the state and nation, such as Bangor Daily News and Navajo Times. Readers were welcome to contribute to each issue, and frequently did.

Although intended to serve the Indians of Maine, readers did not just include on and off- reservation Penobscot Indians and indigenous people from other Maine tribes. Readership also extended beyond Maine borders and outside of the native community, such that the editor included a $2 newsletter subscription fee as of January 1968 for non-Indians (the newsletter was free for American Indians).

The hope behind the subscription fee was to "see if the newsletter could be self supporting." Some national newsletters charge for their articles but local publications like The Chehalis Tribal Newsletter do not charge. Local publications have a stronger desire to actively benefit their community.

There are several stories from the October 1967 issue that are further developed in later issues. For example, the Pine Tree Legal Assistance group is mentioned in October 1967 and is further expanded on in the February 1968 issue.
