= Horace Nelson =

American politician

Penobscot Representative to the Maine Legislature
- In office 1921–1922

Personal details
- Born: Horace Aloysius Nelson; February 16, 1878 Indian Island, Maine, U.S.
- Died: 1962 (aged 84)
- Children: Molly Spotted Elk
- Education: Dartmouth College

Horace Aloysius Nelson (February 16, 1878 – 1962) was a Penobscot political leader and the father of dancer and actress Molly Spotted Elk.

== Early life and education ==
Nelson was born to Peter "Dindy" Nelson and Mary Francis Mitchell Nelson on Indian Island, a Penobscot reservation near Old Town, Maine. He attended Old Town High School and, at age 22, was the second Penobscot to graduate (after baseball player Louis Sockalexis). He was the first to study at Dartmouth College, graduating around 1904.

== Career ==
Nelson served as the Penobscot Representative in the Maine Legislature from 1921 to 1922 and as the Penobscot governor from 1939 to 1941. In addition to trapping, fishing, and gathering sweet-grass for his wife, Philomene Saulis Nelson (1888–1977), to make baskets from, which were standard tasks for Penobscot men, Nelson also contributed to the family household by keeping a vegetable garden and he had a variety of paid jobs such as ferry master to Indian Island, surveyor, security guard, and laborer working for a shipbuilder and a railroad company. Music was his hobby and he occasionally played for the Penobscot Indian Band and encouraged his children to play music.
