= John Neptune =

John Neptune may refer to:

- Old John Neptune (1767–1865), Native American religious and political leader
- John Kaizan Neptune (born 1951), American flautist
