= Theresa Secord =

Penobscot artist, geologist and activist (b. 1958)

- Born: 1958 (age 67–68)
- Citizenship: Penobscot
- Education: University of Southern Maine; University of Wisconsin-Madison
- Occupations: Artist, geologist, activist
- Known for: Geology, basketmaking, activism

Theresa Secord (born 1958) is an artist, basketmaker, geologist and activist from Maine. She is a member of the Penobscot nation, and the great-granddaughter of the well-known weaver Philomene Saulis Nelson. She co-founded, and was the director of, the Maine Indian Basketmakers Alliance (MIBA) in Old Town, Maine.

When apprenticing with basketmaker Madeline Tomer Shay, Secord learned that at the time she was one of few young Wabanaki people being taught to make brown ash and sweet-grass baskets. After Shay's death, Secord founded MIBA in 1993 as a way to preserve Wabanaki language and culture. In 2003, the MIBA received the International Prize for Rural Creativity in part for lowering the average age of basketmakers in Maine from 63 to 43.

Her work has been shown at the Hudson Museum at the University of Maine, at the National Museum of the American Indian in New York, and at the Southwest Museum of the American Indian in Los Angeles. She is the great niece of the renowned Penobscot dancer, actress and writer Molly Spotted Elk, and her great-grandmother is Philomene Saulis Nelson, considered an "acclaimed weaver."

== Education ==
Secord earned a B.A. in geology from the University of Southern Maine in 1981 and an M.S. in Economic Geology from the University of Wisconsin-Madison in 1984. She served as Staff Geologist for the Penobscot Nation. Secord studied weaving and Penobscot language with Madeline Tomer Shay from 1988 to 1993.

== Personal life ==
Secord has two sons, Caleb Hoffman and Will Hoffman. Caleb is a basketmaker apprenticing with Jeremy Frey.

== Awards and honors ==
- Secord received the "Prize for Women's Creativity in Rural Life" by the Women's World Summit Foundation in 2003 for helping rural basket makers rise out of poverty, becoming the first U.S. citizen to receive this award. She was one of five award winners invited to present her work at the United Nations Commission on Human Rights in Geneva, Switzerland.
- In 2009, she received the Community Spirit Award from the First Peoples Fund.
- She was a recipient of a 2016 National Heritage Fellowship awarded by the National Endowment for the Arts, which is the United States government's highest honor in the folk and traditional arts.
- She was the 2017 Bernard Osher Lecturer at the Portland Museum of Art.
- In January 2025, she was one of five winners of the Ruth Foundation for the Arts Award.

== Published works ==
- Changing Faces of Tradition: A Report on the Folk and Traditional Art in the United States - Chapter 5 Organizing
- Two Maine Forest Pests: A Comparison of Approaches to Understanding Threats to Hemlock and Ash Trees in Maine
