= Donna M. Loring =

American politician

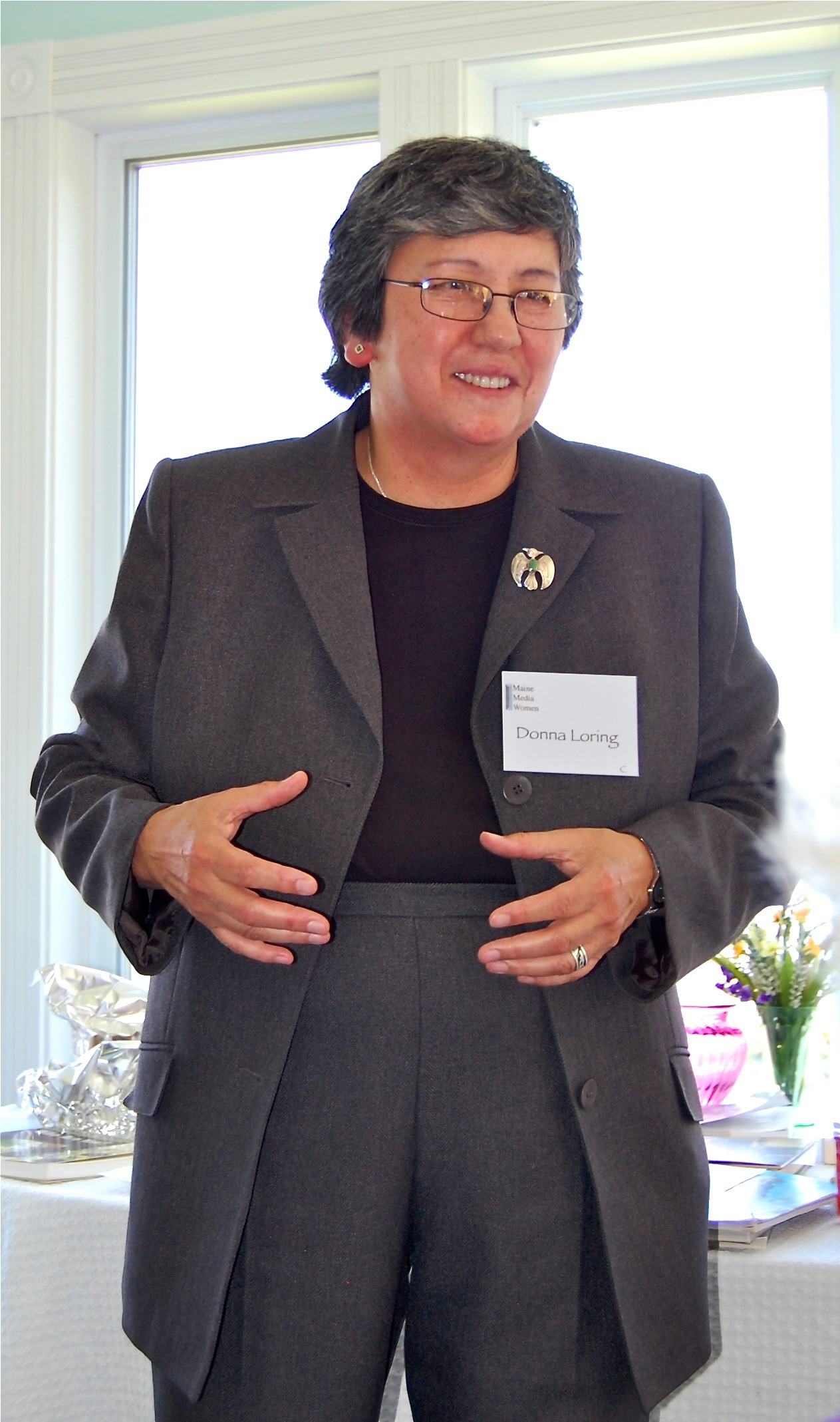
- Loring speaking at Maine Women in Media, Lincolnville, Maine, April 28, 2012.
- Born: October 1, 1948 (age 78); Indian Island, Maine
- Education: University of Maine
- Alma mater: Maine Criminal Justice Academy
- Occupations: Author, broadcaster, and tribal representative of the Penobscot nation in the American state of Maine
- Spouse: Deborah Bouchard
- Writing career
- Notable works: In the Shadow of the Eagle, The Glooskape Chronicles: Creation and the Venetian Basket
- Notable awards: Mary Ann Hartman Award

Donna M. Loring is a Penobscot author, broadcaster, and former Senior Advisor on Tribal Affairs to Janet Mills, the governor of Maine.

== Early life ==
Loring grew up on the Penobscot Indian Island Reservation locally known as Indian Island, Maine, where she was raised by her grandmother. She received a Bachelor of Arts degree in political science from the University of Maine. She graduated from the Maine Criminal Justice Academy and, in 1984, became the police chief for the Penobscot nation, making her the academy's first female graduate to become a police chief. From 1992 to 1997, Loring was the first female director of security at Bowdoin College. During her service in Vietnam, she was stationed at the communications center at Long Binh Army base, fifty miles north of Saigon, where she processed all casualty reports of Southeast Asia. Former Maine Governor Angus King commissioned her to honorary Colonel rank, and he appointed her as Aide de Camp to advise him on women veteran's affairs. In 1999, she was given the Mary Ann Hartman Award, which recognizes Maine women for accomplishments in the arts, politics, business, education, and community services, from the Women in Curriculum and Women's Studies Program at the University of Maine.

== Political career ==
Maine is unique in having tribal representatives sit (in a non-voting capacity) in its state legislature. Following this tradition, which dates back to the 1800s, Loring served several terms on behalf of the Penobscots. She supported a bill in 2000 to remove the word "squaw" from public site names. One of Loring's major accomplishments was her writing and sponsorship of LD 291, "An Act to Require Teaching Maine Native American History and Culture in Maine’s Schools" which passed as a law in 2001. Among her other achievements in the legislature, she created the first "State of the Tribes Address" in the history of Maine. Held in March 2002 and attended by tribal chiefs, the event was broadcast live on Maine Public Television and Radio. Loring also worked on a bill that proposed to extend the time period in which the tribe could purchase land for the Calais Casino. Finally, in April 2008, Loring put before the legislature HP 1681, "Joint Resolution in the Support of the United Nations Declaration on the Rights of Indigenous Peoples." This passed unanimously, making Maine the only state in the country to pass such a resolution in favor of the UN Declaration of Indigenous Rights.

Loring is a former member of the Penobscot tribal council. In 2006, she served as a select person for the town of Richmond for almost a year before moving to Bradley.

== Writing and public speaking ==
Loring hosts a monthly radio show called Wabanaki Windows for WERU in Blue Hill, Maine. She has long written about policy and Maine Indian history; but in recent years, she has turned to creative writing. She published a memoir about her years in the Maine Legislature called In the Shadow of the Eagle (2008), which was favorably reviewed in a leading Native American Studies journal, among other sources. After studying with the playwright William S. Yellow Robe, Jr., Loring also wrote a musical drama called The Glooskape Chronicles: Creation and the Venetian Basket, which received national coverage in the newspaper Indian Country Today.
