= June Sapiel =

Native American activist from Maine

- Born: Penobscot Reservation, Maine
- Citizenship: Penobscot Nation and U.S.
- Occupations: Activist, public speaker
- Known for: NoDAPL activism

June Sapiel, a citizen of the Penobscot Nation, is a Native American activist and public speaker from Maine.

== Background ==
June Sapiel was born and raised on the Penobscot Indian Island Reservation, also known as Indian Island and was the niece of John "Sam" Sapiel (d. 2017), who was a well-known Indigenous activist.

== Activism ==
Sapiel focuses most of her activism work on Indigenous rights, land and water rights, and women's rights. June Sapiel has been a speaker at the 2018 National Day of Mourning (United States protest), the 2017 Augusta 2017 Women's March at the Maine State House, and other various events. Sapiel was a member of and speaker for the Dakota Access Pipeline protests. She also has marched for women's rights and has supported the change from Columbus Day to Indigenous Peoples' Day.

=== Dakota Access Pipeline ===
On September 17, 2016, Sapiel was a speaker at a protest in Portland's Congress Square Park against the Dakota Access Pipeline that brought together Penobscot Nation members and climate activists. The protest was aimed to call on President Barack Obama to reject a $3.8 billion proposed pipeline in South Dakota.

On October 28, 2016, Sapiel's son, David Demo, was arrested for protesting the oil pipeline in North Dakota. In an interview, she addressed the ongoing battle between the water rights with the state of Maine and the Penobscot people. Sapiel and other Penobscot Nation members in addition to the Bangor Social and Economic Justice Coalition prepared a candlelight vigil in Bangor, Maine, as well as Portland, Maine to "stand in solidarity."

In January 2017, Sapiel helped to organize a protest in Bangor, Maine, outside of TD Bank demanding they withdraw funding from the Dakota Access Pipeline. Other organizations also encouraged community members to divest from TD Bank to "standing in solidarity." Sapiel also traveled several times to North Dakota to join the protests, and spoke to the press from Standing Rock in February 2017.

=== Indigenous Peoples Day ===
In addition to protesting the Dakota Access Pipeline, June Sapiel has also represented Penobscot Nation to discuss replacing Columbus Day with Indigenous Peoples Day. She attended a forum with Orono, Maine, councilors to express the opinion of the Penobscot people in regard to the name change. Orono town councilors voted 6-0 in favor of changing the name in the town. In March 2019 the Maine House voted to change Columbus Day to Indigenous People's Day statewide and is on the agenda to vote in the state senate.
