= Darren Ranco =

Native American scholar and researcher

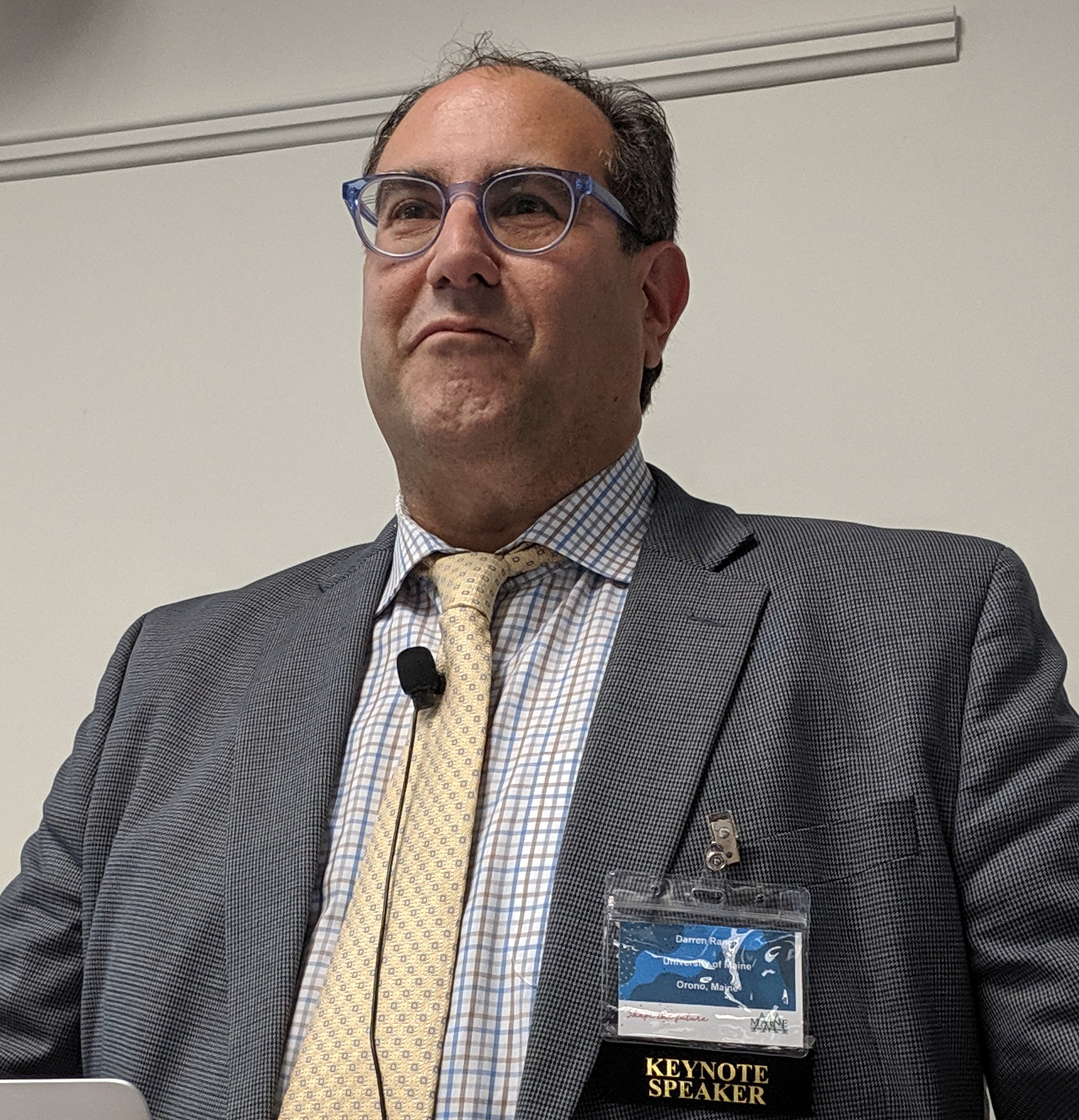
- Ranco at the 2019 conference of Maine Archives and Museums
- Citizenship: Penobscot Nation
- Occupation: Anthropologist

Darren Ranco is a Penobscot Nation anthropologist and academic. His scholarship centers on how climate and environmental science interfaces with Indigenous knowledge systems. His research focuses on how using Indigenous diplomacy and critiques of the liberalism applied to practices of environmental upheaval, to protect cultural resources, specifically looking at exposure to environmental risks.

== Education ==
Ranco received his BA in anthropology, with honors, and classical studies from Dartmouth College in 1993. He then continued on to get his MA in anthropology from Harvard University in 1997. A year later, in 1998, Ranco received his MSEL (Master of Studies in Environmental Law) from Vermont Law School. In 2000 he received his PhD in Social Anthropology from Harvard University.

== Career ==
Ranco first worked as an assistant professor for the Department of Ethnic Studies and Native American studies programs at University of California, Berkeley. He then sat an assistant professor at Dartmouth College for the Native American Studies Program and Environmental Studies Program. Ranco sits as a joint Associate Professor for the Department of Anthropology and in Native American Programs at the University of Maine.

Ranco has sat as the Chair of the Native American Programs, including Native American Studies and the Wabanaki Center, at the University of Maine since 2011. He also sits as the Coordinator of Native American Research at the University of Maine since 2009. Prior to these appointments he sat as the Chair of Native American Studies at the University of California, Berkeley from 2001 to 2002.

== Selected publications ==
- Bryant, Bunyan (2011-05-01). Environmental Crisis Or Crisis of Epistemology?: Working for Sustainable Knowledge and Environmental Justice. Morgan James Publishing. ISBN 978-1-60037-840-9.
