= Joseph Orono =

Joseph Orono (25 November 1688 — 5 February 1801) was a Penobscot Indian chief or sachem who lived on the Penobscot River in present-day Maine. The town of Orono, Maine, which contains the University of Maine, is named for him.

By the time Orono was born, the Penobscot people had been in close contact with French Catholic missionaries and traders for over a generation, and Orono was himself of mixed ancestry, probably the grandson of Jean-Vincent d'Abbadie de Saint-Castin, The 3rd Baron Castin, who had settled at the mouth of the Penobscot River (the site of the present town of Castine, Maine) in the 1660s. Saint-Castin married the daughter of Penobscot sachem Madockawando. In 1774 American colonists founded a village called Stillwater, Maine, just below "Indian Old Town" at the site of a falls. Relations between the colonists and Indians were sufficiently peaceful that, when Stillwater incorporated as a town in 1806, it named itself Orono after the recently deceased Penobscot sachem, who had lived to the age of 112.
