= Lucy Nicolar Poolaw =

Chautauqua and lyceum performer (1882–1969)

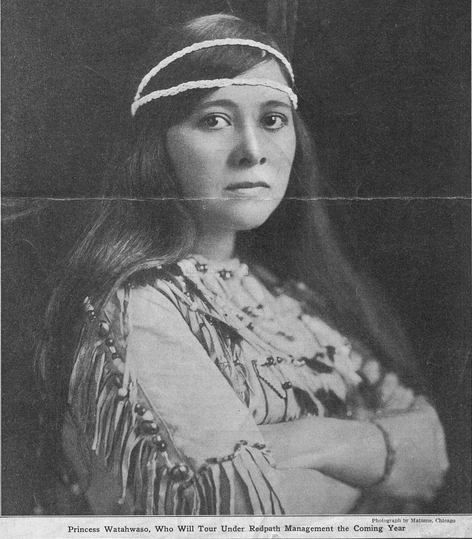
Lucy Nicolar Poolaw at the beginning of her touring career, from the cover of a 1916 publication.

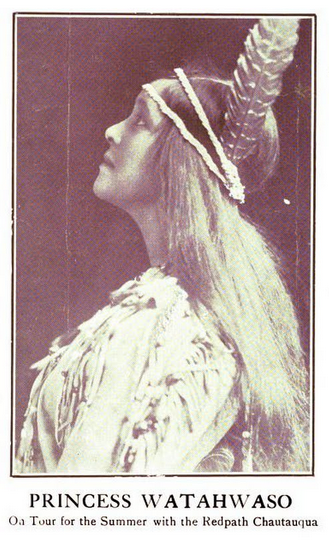
Lucy Nicolar Poolaw as Princess Watahwaso, from the cover of a 1917 publication.

Lucy Nicolar Poolaw (June 22, 1882 – March 27, 1969), also called Wa-Tah-Wa-So and billed as Princess Watahwaso, was a Penobscot and a performer on the Chautauqua and lyceum circuits.

== Early life ==
Lucy Nicolar (Wa-Tah-Wa-So) was born on the Penobscot Indian Island Reservation in Maine, the daughter of Joseph Nicolar and Elizabeth Joseph, both Penobscot. Her father was a lecturer, representative to the Maine Legislature, and writer who published The Life and Traditions of the Red Man (1893). As a child, Lucy Nicolar learned basketry and sold handmade goods with her family in Kennebunkport, Maine. She and her sisters also sang for the tourists. As a teen, she was one of the charter members of the island's Wabanaki Club, a women's club admitted to the Maine Federation of Women's Clubs in 1897.

During her late teens, Nicolar began traveling to public performances at events such as sportsman's shows; during one such trip Nicolar caught the attention of a Harvard administrator. He arranged opportunities for her to study music in Boston and New York City.

== Career ==
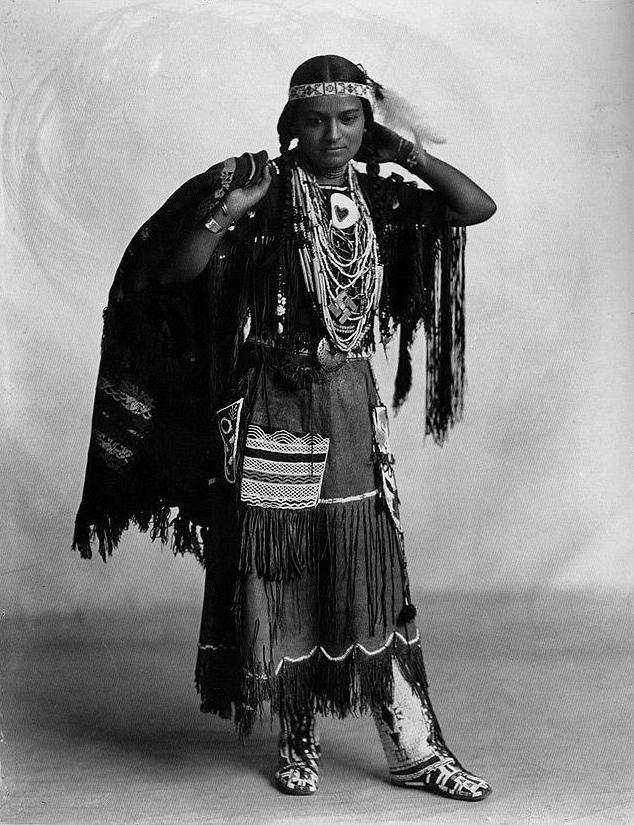
Wah-Ta-Waso in 1898, photographed by Frank A. Rinehart

Nicolar often combined political activism with entertainment. In January 1900, when 17 years old, Nicolar attended a debate in New York City about immigration. She silenced the attendees with the statement, "I believe I am the only true American here." She then sat at a piano, sang a plaintive song, and played Chopin, touching everyone in the room.

Lucy Nicolar toured the United States using the stage name "Princess Watahwaso", on the Chautauqua and lyceum circuits beginning in 1916, singing songs, playing piano, telling stories, dancing, and wearing a fringed costume. She sang "The Star-Spangled Banner" at the annual banquet of the Redpath-Vawter Chautauqua organization. She performed at New York's Aeolian Hall and was on the program for Music Day at the Woman's Press Club in New York in 1920. Writing about her show in 1920, the New York Times commented that "Watahwaso's native and acquired gifts produced a degree of charm not often heard in primitive music." Although it was presented as "primitive music", most of Princess Watahwaso's repertoire was written by non-Native composers, including Thurlow Lieurance and Charles Wakefield Cadman.

Lucy Nicolar also made more than a dozen recordings for the Victor Talking Machine Company between 1917 and 1930.

After 1929, she retired from the platform shows and Lucy Nicolar Poolaw and her husband ran a basket shop, Chief Poolaw's Teepee, in Maine. She was also active with her sisters Emma and Florence in working for Native American rights in Maine. Once Penobscot people living on reservation land in Maine secured the right to vote in 1955, Lucy Nicolar Poolaw cast the first ballot.

== Personal life ==
Lucy Nicolar married a doctor from Boston in 1905; they divorced in 1913. She married her manager and lawyer, Thomas F. Gorman, before 1918; they divorced, too. Her third husband was Bruce Poolaw (1906-1984), a fellow entertainer. They retired to Maine together. Lucy Nicolar Poolaw died in 1969, aged 87 years, on Indian Island. The Poolaw's giftshop, renamed Princess Watahwaso's Teepee, is now a museum run by Lucy's nephew, Charles Norman Shay.

One of Poolaw's baskets is in the collection of the Oklahoma Historical Society. In 2010 and 2011, there was an exhibit about her, called "Aunt Lu: The Story of Princess Watahwaso", at the Abbe Museum.

Photographer Horace Poolaw was her brother-in-law.
