= Wayne Mitchell (politician) =

Penobscot politician (1952–2019)

Member of the Maine House of Representatives
- In office 2008 – December 2016

Personal details
- Born: August 22, 1952
- Died: July 12, 2019 (aged 66)
- Profession: Gaming Specialist; Legislator; Tribal/State Relations Liaison

Theodore 'Wayne' Mitchell (August 22, 1952 — July 12, 2019) was a Penobscot politician. He was elected by the Penobscot Tribe of Maine to serve as a non-voting tribal representative to the Maine House of Representatives beginning in 2008. He was re-elected in 2010 and 2012. From 2009 to 2010, Mitchell served on the Judiciary Committee. During the 125th and 126th legislatures, Mitchell served on the Veterans and Legal Affairs Committee. He was unenrolled.
