= Old John Neptune =

John Neptune
- Born: 1767
- Died: 1865 (aged 97–98)
- Resting place: Indian Island
- Occupation: vice-chief
- Years active: 1816-1867
- Partner: Mary Pelagie Nicola (known regionally as “Molly Molasses”)
- Children: Sarah Molasses (also known as Sarah Neptune)

Old John Neptune (Penobscot, (July 22, 1767 – May 8, 1865) was elected Lieutenant-Governor at Indian Island, Old Town, Maine, in 1816, a life-time position. Born into the Eel clan, Neptune had a powerful father, John (Orsong) Neptune, who had been the tribe's war chief. As the most powerful leader of the Penobscot for almost half a century, he was popularly (but incorrectly) known as "the Governor." Also feared, he had the reputation of being a medicine man (m'teoulino, in the Penobscot language).

John Neptune's lifelong partner and mother of his four children was a Penobscot businesswoman, Mary Pelagie Nicola (known regionally as “Molly Molasses”). One of his children, Sarah Molasses (also known as Sarah Neptune), also became a businesswoman.

Shortly after Maine achieved statehood, the areas of the Penobscot and St. John rivers were mapped with guidance from Neptune.

In The Maine Woods (1864), writer Henry David Thoreau described an 1853 visit to Neptune at his Old Town home.
