= Ssipsis =

Penobscot poet

ssipsis
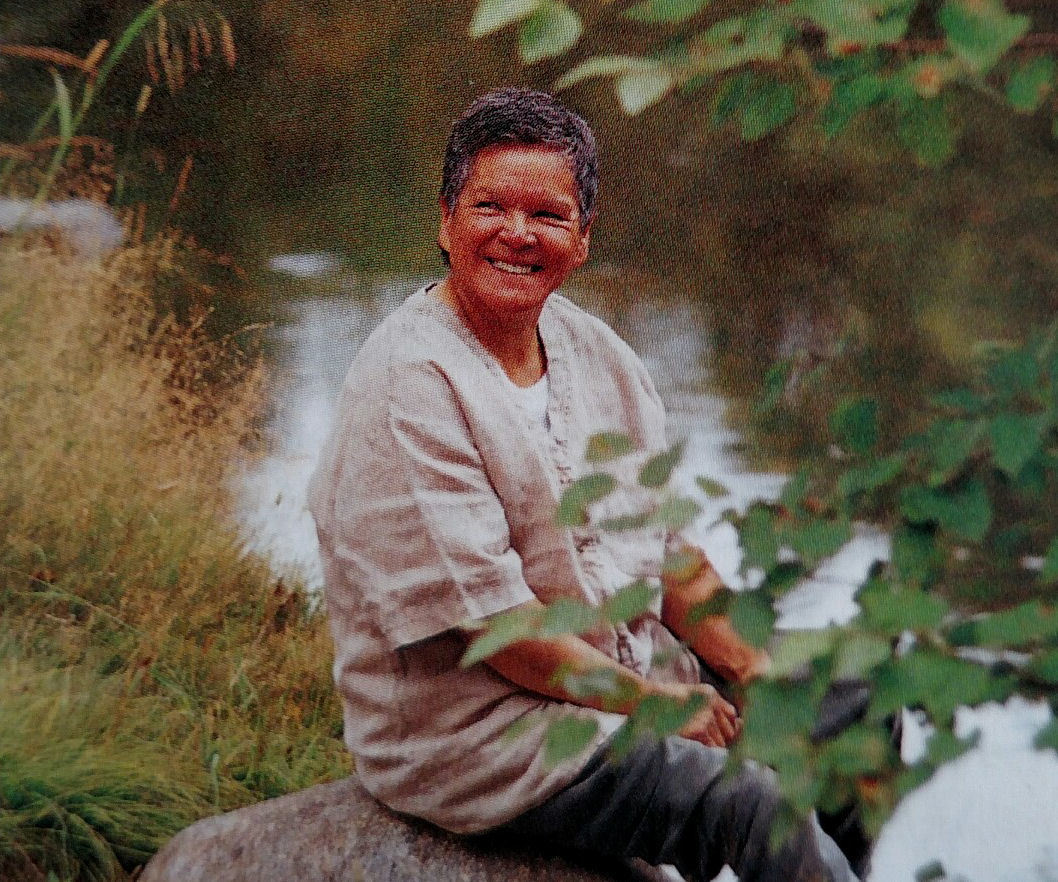
- Image of SSipsis
- Born: Eugenia Theresa Thomas; June 10, 1941; Indian Island, Maine, US
- Died: October 27, 2015 (aged 74); Indian Island, Maine, US
- Education: Colby College
- Occupations: Poet; social worker; artist; storyteller; editor

ssipsis (birth name Eugenia T. Thompson) (June 10, 1941 – October 27, 2015) was a Penobscot poet, social worker, visual artist, writer, editor and storyteller. Much of her work was focused on and inspired by the advancement of Indigenous people.

== Life ==
ssipsis' mother, Dorothy Phillips, was Mohawk and her father, William Thomas, was Penobscot. Her traditional name is Penobscot for "little bird". She was raised by Eugenia Mary Thomas on Indian Island where she spent most of her life. ssipsis earned a sociology degree at Colby College where she met her husband Kenneth C. Thompson. ssipsis and Kenneth had four children together.

ssipsis, a member of the Penobscot Nation, always fought for the rights of her people; most notably, she led a protest in 1970 in Old Town, Maine regarding a Penobscot treaty agreement. ssipsis is also known for her birch-bark etchings and for her work on the preservation of Penobscot art and culture. Her art often reflected her dedication to tribal rights, including hemmed pieces to make political statements. ssipsis was also the editor of the Maine Indian Newsletter, an independent publication that ran through the 1960s and 1970s and served the native peoples of Maine, along with other subscribed readers outside the local community. She typed each twenty page newsletter herself on a typewriter, often recirculating pertinent articles from local, state, and national newspapers, including many other American Indian periodicals.

== Bibliography ==
=== Books ===
- Molly Molasses and Me: A Collection of Living Adventures, Robin Hood Books, 1990
- Prayers, Poems, and Pathways, Robin Hood Books, 2007.

== Examples of art ==
- Birch Bark Turtle Shell
