= Maulian Bryant =

Native American Tribal Ambassador

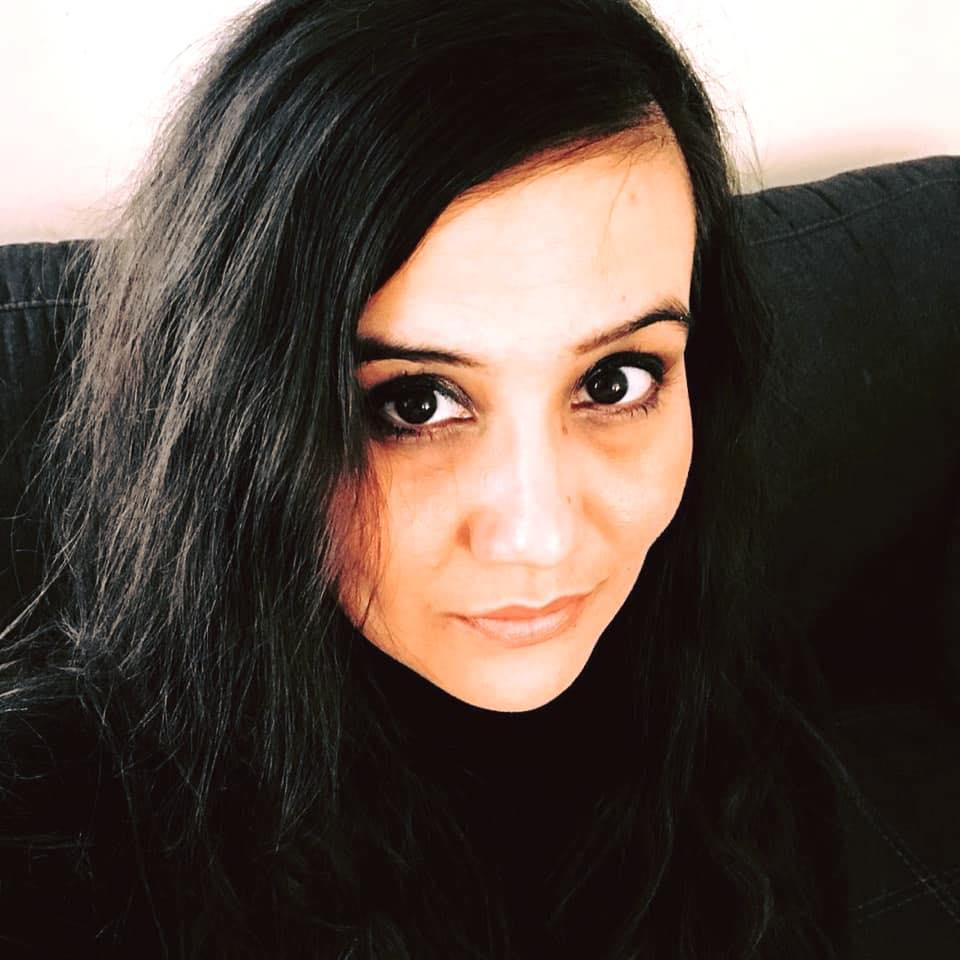
- Bryant in 2019

1st Penobscot Nation Tribal Ambassador
- In office September 2017 – September 2024
- Preceded by: Position established
- Succeeded by: Vacant

Member of the Penobscot Nation Tribal Council
- In office 2016 – December 2020

Personal details
- Born: May 17, 1984 (age 42) Indian Island, Penobscot Nation, Maine, US
- Education: University of Maine (Political Science)

Maulian Bryant (formerly Maulian Dana; born May 17, 1984) is a Penobscot activist and political figure. A former member of the Penobscot Nation Tribal Council, she was appointed the Penobscot Nation's first tribal ambassador in 2017 and continued in that role until 2024. In September of that year, she accepted a position as executive director of the Wabanaki Alliance, representing the four Indigenous Nations in Maine.

== Early life and education ==
Bryant was born Maulian Dana on the Penobscot Indian Island Reservation on May 17, 1984, and is one of five children. She is the daughter of former Penobscot Nation Chief Barry Dana, who served from 2000 to 2004. She attended the University of Maine, where she was awarded the Margaret Chase Smith Public Policy Scholarship in 2005 and graduated in 2006 with a bachelors degree in political science. In 2022, Colby College awarded Bryant an honorary doctorate of law.

== Political career ==
Bryant was elected to the Penobscot Nation Tribal Council in 2016 for a four-year term. In September 2017, Chief Kirk Francis appointed her as the first Tribal Ambassador of the Penobscot Nation. She is a regular fixture at the Maine State House in Augusta where she can be found testifying on behalf of her community and helping to create policy. She has proposed bills such as An Act to Ban Native American Mascots in Maine Schools and provided necessary input for the bill to change Columbus Day to Indigenous Peoples Day. Since the fall of 2018 Bryant has been a board member of the Maine Center for Economic Policy, a nonpartisan research and policy organization which focuses on improving the economic well-being of low- and moderate-income Maine residents. Following the December 2020 release of Maine's four-year action plan on climate change, Bryant was named co-chair of the Equity Subcommittee of the Maine Climate Council. Earlier that year, she was a recipient of the Maryann Hartman Awards, which recognizes achievements from women in Maine. In September 2024, Bryant resigned her ambassadorship and accepted a new position as executive director of the Wabanaki Alliance, an organization founded in 2020 to represent the interests of the four Indigenous nations in Maine: Penobscot Nation, Houlton Band of Maliseet Indians, Mi'kmaq Nation, and Passamaquoddy Tribe.

== Activism ==
=== "Hunt for the Indian" controversy ===
The Skowhegan, Maine Chamber of Commerce scheduled a holiday activity entitled Hunt for the Indian in November 2017. The intention of the event was to increase visits to local businesses by offering a discounts to individuals who located small Native American figurines. Bryant addressed this by both a call to action among Native Americans and allies and by addressing the issue herself head on. The choice of the Chamber's campaign was especially egregious due to the Battle of Norridgewock and the proclamation issued by Spencer Phips, both of which led to the deaths of numerous Abenaki and Penobscot Peoples. On November 5, 2017 the Chamber issued an apology stating:

Never were we so wrong in thinking that this latest promotion involving the Chamber’s Skowhegan Indian statue would be a good idea. This event has been canceled. It was never our intention to offend anyone, quite the opposite. It was our goal to honor our community icon, support local business and engage the people of greater Skowhegan. No apology can take away our lack of empathy and foresight in this decision. And, for that we are truly sorry. Now we understand we’ve created a bigger problem of not seeing our actions from others’ perspectives, given the local and national issues around mascots and racism.

Bryant later commended the Chamber on the cancellation of the event and their public apology.

=== Native American mascots ===
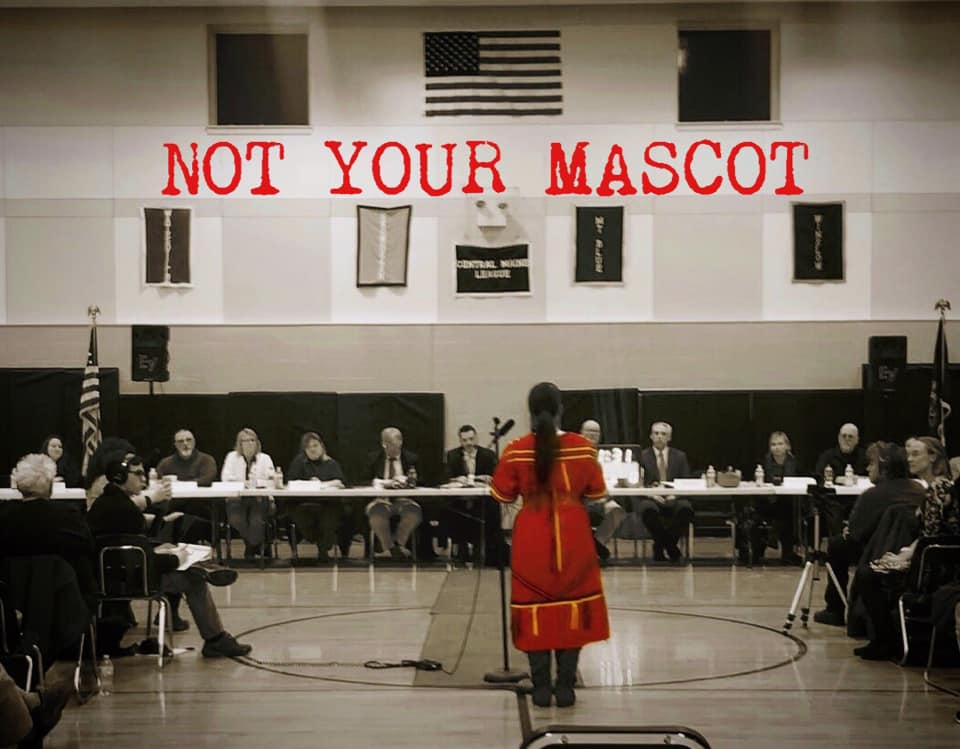
Maulian Bryant speaking at Skowhegan, Maine school board meeting

As the founder of Maine's Not Your Mascot chapter, Bryant has been advocating for the eradication of Native American themed mascots, icons and names within the states educational districts.

In 2015 Bryant led an effort to retire the Indians mascot in Skowhegan, Maine. On April 13, 2015, Bryant was part of a panel of Wabanaki Peoples who spoke before the Skowhegan, Maine School Administrative District 54 board, residents, faculty and supporters. The school committee voted against retiring the mascot on May 7, 2015

Bryant then went on to work with other school districts in Maine and was successful in changing the Native American mascots in all remaining districts with the exception of Skowhegan. Beginning in late 2018 Bryant, other Native American leaders and tribal members along with non-Native allies, began addressing the issue in Skowhegan once more. After a number of heated school board meetings as well as a district wide forum, the Skowhegan Indians mascot was retired. Shortly thereafter Bryant introduced bill LD944, An Act To Ban Native American Mascots in All Public Schools, sponsored by Representative Benjamin Collings. On April 30, 2019 the bill passed in the Maine Senate by a vote of 23-10

=== Missing and murdered Indigenous women ===
Bryant has been at the forefront of bringing attention to the missing and murdered Indigenous women epidemic that has plagued Indigenous communities for years. In 2019, she worked with Representative Benjamin Collings on LD 766, a bill that would permit the Penobscot Nation and Passamaquoddy Tribe to prosecute non-tribal offenders in tribal court. In November 2024, she testified before the US House of Representatives at the request of Chellie Pingree and as the representative of the Wabanaki Alliance. She said one in three Indigenous women are victimized in their lifetime by violent crimes, which do not receive sufficient attention. She also blamed a lack of funding, poor coordination with state and federal agencies, and restrictions from the Maine Indian Claims Settlement Act.

== Personal life ==
Bryant continues to live on the Penobscot Indian Island Reservation with her three children. Prior to her 2017 appointment as ambassador, Bryant served as director of human resources for Penobscot Indian Nation Enterprises.

== See also ==
- List of Native American politicians
- Native American women in politics
