= Molly Spotted Elk =

American actress

- Molly Dellis
- Born: Mary Alice Nelson; November 17, 1903; Indian Island, Maine
- Died: February 21, 1977 (aged 73); Indian Island, Maine
- Other name: Mary Nelson Archambaud
- Education: University of Pennsylvania; Non-degree
- Occupations: Writer; dancer; actress
- Years active: 1920s–30s

Mary Nelson Archambaud (born Mary Alice Nelson; Penobscot pronunciation: Molly Dellis; November 17, 1903 – February 21, 1977), best known by her stage name Molly Spotted Elk, was a Penobscot Indian dancer, actress, and writer who was born on the Penobscot Indian Island Reservation, in Maine.

== Biography ==
Born November 17, 1903, on Indian Island, a Penobscot Reservation near Old Town, Maine, Spotted Elk was christened Mary Alice Nelson by a Catholic priest, but the Penobscot pronounced her first and middle names Molly Dellis, which was often shortened to Molly Dell or Molly. Her parents were Horace Nelson, a Penobscot political leader, and her mother Philomene Saulis Nelson (1888–1977), an artisan basket maker who sold her crafts to tourists. Her father was the first Penobscot to go to Dartmouth College. There, he studied for a year and became a governor of the tribe. Molly was the oldest of eight children. All of them helped their parents sell the famous baskets Philomene made in tourist towns. In addition to that, Molly learned traditional dances and performed for tourists who stayed at hotels.

Spotted Elk was involved in Vaudeville shows at various times interspersed with her early education. She attended the University of Pennsylvania under the sponsorship of Frank Speck. Due to a lack of funds, she was only able to attend the prestigious college for two years, and then returned to touring, and dancing her tribe’s native dances. Although she had returned to her life as a performer, she did not let this crush her spirits and she began to write and create her own music and costumes. Her family is said to have described her as “A happy and completely free spirit.”

Spotted Elk's career is marked by a tension between her desire for fame and success as an actress and performer, and the racist expectations of White American and European society that forced her to don skimpy buckskin costumes and act out stereotypes in order to do so. Returning to rural Maine after living in New York City and Paris, wrote her biographer, "was like an old pair of moccasins that one dreamed of during years of high-heeled city life—only to find, upon slipping into them, that they felt less comfortable than remembered because the shape of one's feet had changed."

Molly wrote the book Katahdin: Wigwam’s Tales of the Abnaki Tribe and a Dictionary of Penobscot and Passamaquoddy Words with French and English Translations which includes traditional Penobscot stories in English and a dictionary of the Penobscot language.

Her granddaughter is the Penobscot artist, activist and basketweaver Theresa Secord.

=== Work life ===
She performed with Miller Brothers' 101 Ranch both on tour and in Oklahoma. It was as a result of winning a dance competition of Natives Americans in Oklahoma that she was adopted by the Cheyenne and given the name of Spotted Elk.

In 1926, Elk moved to New York looking for opportunities, fame, and fortune. She had different jobs to save money for school such as a nude model, dance teacher, and more.

After a lot of practice, she won a role in the chorus line of the Foster Girls. They traveled to San Antonio for eight months to perform at the Aztec. There, she decide to pursue a writing career, so when she was not dancing, she was writing poetry, adventure stories, literary fiction, and more. After the tour was done, she went back to New York where she continued working.

She starred in The Silent Enemy, a 1930 silent-film drama of American Indian life. Sometimes she worked as an artist's model; among the artists for whom she modeled was Bonnie MacLeary.

=== Life in Paris ===
In 1931, she arrived in Paris to perform at the International Colonial Exposition. In Paris, she found an enthusiastic audience for traditional Native American dance. She wrote in her diary:

Maybe I am foolish, with no money, but hopes galore. But I DO want to do something with my Indian dancing here in a serious artistic way. And I’m willing to take a great chance to accomplish it.

While there, she met and married French journalist Jean Archambaud. At this time she began researching the folktales and traditions of the Native American northeast.

In 1933, the Depression affected Paris. As a result, she had fewer opportunities to dance, and Archambaud was fired from his job. In 1934, she moved to New York where she had a few jobs; she was pregnant and gave birth there. In 1938, Elk and her daughter moved back to Paris to be reunited with Archambaud. However, their happiness lasted only a short while; the Nazis invaded and she and her daughter were separated from Archambaud. They never saw him again. Together mother and child crossed the Pyrenees Mountains on foot to Spain. From there they returned to the United States, where Elk spent the rest of her life on the Penobscot Reservation.

== Bibliography ==
- Molly Spotted Elk (2003) Katahdin: Wigwam's Tales of the Abnaki Tribe and a Dictionary of Penobscot and Passamaquoddy Words with French and English Translation, Maine Folklife Center, ISBN 0-943197-29-5.
