= Auel =

- Municipality
- Coat of arms

- Location of Auel within Rhein-Lahn-Kreis district
- Interactive map of Auel
- Location within Germany Location within Rhineland-Palatinate
- Coordinates: 50°10′16″N 7°45′59″E
- Country: Germany
- State: Rhineland-Palatinate
- District: Rhein-Lahn-Kreis
- Municipal assoc.: Loreley

Government
  - Mayor (2019–24): Ralph-Dietmar Seitz

Area
  - Total: 2.65 km^{2} (1.02 sq mi)
- Elevation: 275 m (902 ft)

Population (2025-12-31)
  - Total: 174
  - Density: 65.7/km^{2} (170/sq mi)
- Time zone: UTC+01:00 (CET)
  - Summer (DST): UTC+02:00 (CEST)
- Postal codes: 56357
- Dialling codes: 06771
- Vehicle registration: EMS, DIZ, GOH

Auel (German pronunciation: [ˈaʊəl]) is a municipality in the district of Rhein-Lahn, in Rhineland-Palatinate, in western Germany.

== History ==
In 1250 Auel was first documented as Owele. In 1437 Auel tax especially for wine was sold from the Counts of Helfenstein to the Counts of Katzenelnbogen for 60 guilder.
