= Maine Law =

Maine Law may refer to:

- Maine Liquor Law, 1851 anti-liquor law
- University of Maine School of Law, law school of the University of Maine located in Portland, Maine
- Law of Maine, laws and legal system of the state of Maine
