= Penobscot Indian Island Reservation =

Coordinates: 45°22′36″N 68°31′38″W

Indian Island Álənαpe Mə́nəhan
- Indian reservation
- Penobscot Indian Island Reservation
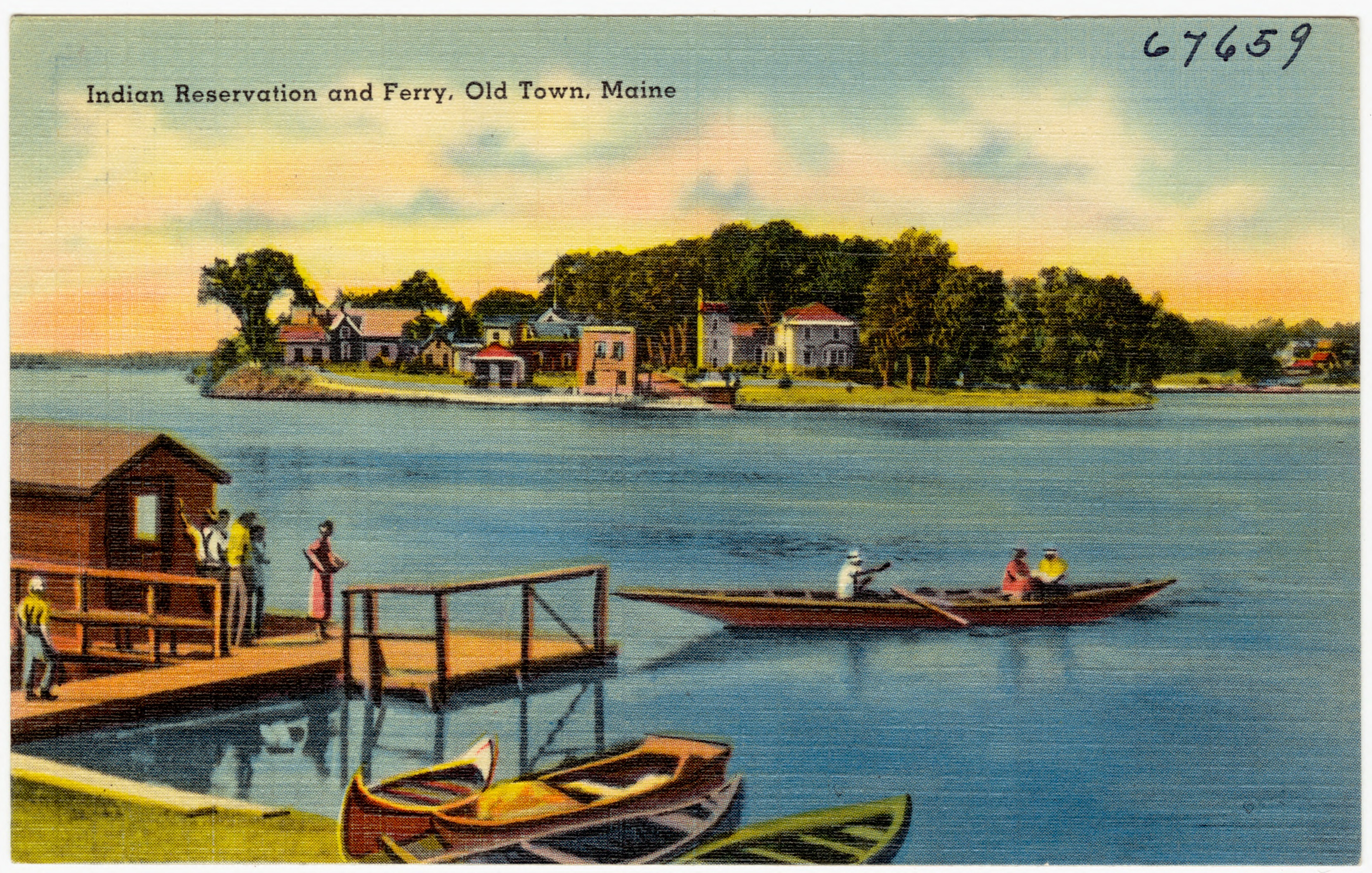

- Tribe: Penobscot
- Country: United States
- State: Maine
- County: Penobscot

Government
  - Type: Tribal Council
  - Chief: Kirk Francis
  - Vice Chief: Maria Girouard
  - Council Members: Maulian Bryant; Jason Pardilla; Craig Sanborn; Edwina Mitchell; John Neptune; Erik Sappier; Saul "Saugum" Dana; Miles Francis; Jo-Ann Lolar; Faye Lawson; Jayden Love; Mark Sockbeson

Area
  - Total: 57.0 km^{2} (22.0 sq mi)
  - Land: 19.5 km^{2} (7.5 sq mi)
  - Water: 37.4 km^{2} (14.4 sq mi) 65.7%
- Elevation: 44 m (144 ft)

Population (2020)
  - Total: 758
  - Density: 38.9/km^{2} (101/sq mi)
- Time zone: EST
- Postal code: 04468
- Website: www.penobscotnation.org

Historical population
Census	Pop.	Note	%±
1900	269		—
1910	320		19.0%
1950	323		—
1960	383		18.6%
1970	317		−17.2%
1980	458		44.5%
1990	476		3.9%
2000	562		18.1%
2010	610		8.5%
2020	758		24.3%
U.S. Decennial Census

Penobscot Indian Island Reservation (Abenaki: Álənαpe Mə́nəhan) is an Indian reservation for the Penobscot Tribe of Maine, a federally recognized tribe of the Penobscot in Penobscot County, Maine, United States, near Old Town. The population was 758 at the 2020 census. The reservation extends for many miles alongside 15 towns and two unorganized territories in a thin string along the Penobscot River, from its base at Indian Island, near Old Town and Milford, northward to the vicinity of East Millinocket, almost entirely in Penobscot County. A small, uninhabited part of the reservation used as a game preserve and hunting and gathering ground is in South Aroostook, Aroostook County, by which it passes along its way northward.

== Government ==
The Penobscot Tribe of Maine is headquartered in Indian Island, Maine. The tribal chief is Kirk Francis. The vice-chief is Maria Girouard.

== History ==
The Penobscot people long inhabited the area between present-day Old Town and Bangor, and still occupy tribal land on the nearby Penobscot Indian Island Reservation. The first European to visit the site was probably the Portuguese Estêvão Gomes in 1524, who was working for Spain. He was followed by the French explorer Samuel de Champlain in 1605. Champlain was looking for the mythical city of Norumbega, thought to be where Bangor now lies. After a meeting with some Indians he dismissed the notion of such a city. French missionary priests settled among the Penobscot. This valley was contested between France and Britain into the 1750s; after Britain defeated France in the Seven Years' War, the territory became dominated by England. It was one of the last northern regions to become part of New England. One of the most important Penobscot chiefs was Madockawando.

=== King William's War ===
There were tensions on the border between New England and Acadia, which New France defined as reaching the Kennebec River in southern Maine. English settlers from Massachusetts (whose charter included the Maine area) had expanded their settlements into Acadia. To secure New France's claim to present-day Maine, New France established Catholic missions among the three largest native villages in the region: one on the Kennebec River (Norridgewock); one farther north on the Penobscot River (Penobscot) and one on the Saint John River (Medoctec). For their part, in response to King Philip's War, the five Indian tribes in the region of Acadia created the Wabanaki Confederacy to form a political and military alliance with New France to stop the New England expansion.

On Abbé Petit's advice, Father Louis-Pierre Thury settled at Pentagouet (Castine, Maine) in 1690, near Jean-Vincent d'Abbadie de Saint-Castin, where he remained eight years. He acquired great influence over the Abenaki and took part in their expeditions. In 1689 he accompanied Saint-Castin on the raid that resulted in the destruction of Pemaquid (1689); he left a detailed account of events. In 1692 Thury accompanied a war party against York (Maine) in what became known as the Candlemas Massacre.

==== Raid on Penobscot (1692) ====
Benjamin Church's third expedition to Acadia during the war was in 1692 when he conducted a retaliatory raid with 450 men against the Penobscot village.

Two years later, Thury worked to thwart the actions of Phips, who wanted to keep the Abenaki neutral; Thury played an important role in retaining them under French influence. He took part in the attack against Pescadouet (Oyster Bay) in New Hampshire, and was present with Robinau de Villebon and a party of Abenaki at the capture of Pemaquid by Pierre Le Moyne d'Iberville in 1696. The bishop of Quebec made him his vicar general in 1698 and appointed him to be the superior of the missions in Acadia.

Madockawando and others from Penobscot fought alongside Hertel Portneuf and St. Castin at the Battle of Fort Loyal (May 1690). They were also involved in Raid on Wells (1692). Finally they accompanied Villie in the Raid on Oyster River in 1694. He died during the war in 1697.

=== Father Rale's War ===
==== Raid on Thomaston (1722) ====
On 15 July 1722, Father Lauverjat from Penobscot led 500-600 natives from Penobscot and Medunic (Maliseet) to lay siege to Fort St. Georges in Colonel Thomas Westbrook's home town of Thomaston for twelve days. They burned the sawmill, a large sloop, and sundry houses, and killed many of their cattle. Five New Englanders were killed and seven were taken prisoner, while the New Englanders killed twenty Maliseet and Penobscot warriors.

==== Raid on Penobscot (1723) ====
During Father Rale's War, Father Lauverjat was established at the mission. On March 9, 1723, Colonel Thomas Westbrook from Thomaston led 230 men to the Penobscot River and traveled approximately 32 miles (51 km) upstream to the Penobscot village. They found a large Penobscot fort—70 yards (64 m) by 50 yards (46 m), with 14-foot (4.3 m) walls surrounding 23 wigwams. There was also a large chapel (60 by 30 feet (18.3 by 9.1 m)). The village was vacant of people, and the soldiers burned it to the ground.

Starting in 1775, Condeskeag became the site of treaty negotiations by which the Penobscot people were made to give up almost all their ancestral lands, a process complete by about 1820, when Maine became a state. The tribe was eventually left with only their main village on an island upriver from Bangor, called "Indian Old Town" by the settlers. Eventually a white settlement taking the name Old Town was planted on the river bank opposite the Penobscot village, which began to be called "Indian Island." It continues as the base of the federally recognized Penobscot Nation.

== Tourism ==
The reservation is home to a small museum. Penobscot High Stakes Bingo, which operated from 1973 until 2015, was one of the first Native American gambling enterprises operating in the country.

== Notable residents ==
- Major League Baseball player Louis Francis "Chief" Sockalexis (Cleveland Spiders outfielder, 1897–1899, career batting average .313) was born on the reservation and is buried at St. Anne Church Cemetery.
- Sherri Mitchell, author and attorney
- ssipsis, a writer who grew up on the reservation
- June Sapiel, activist
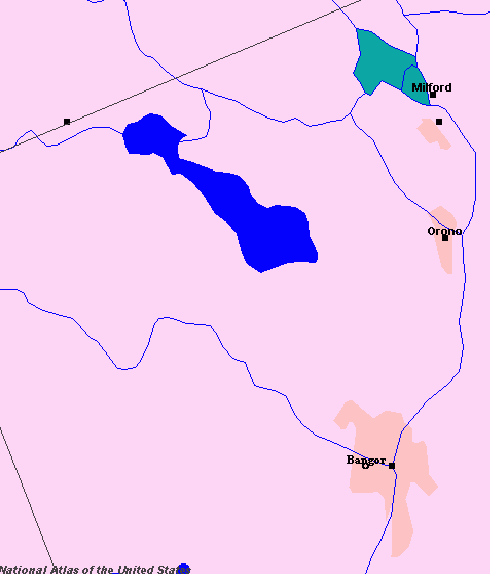
  Indian Island shown in green
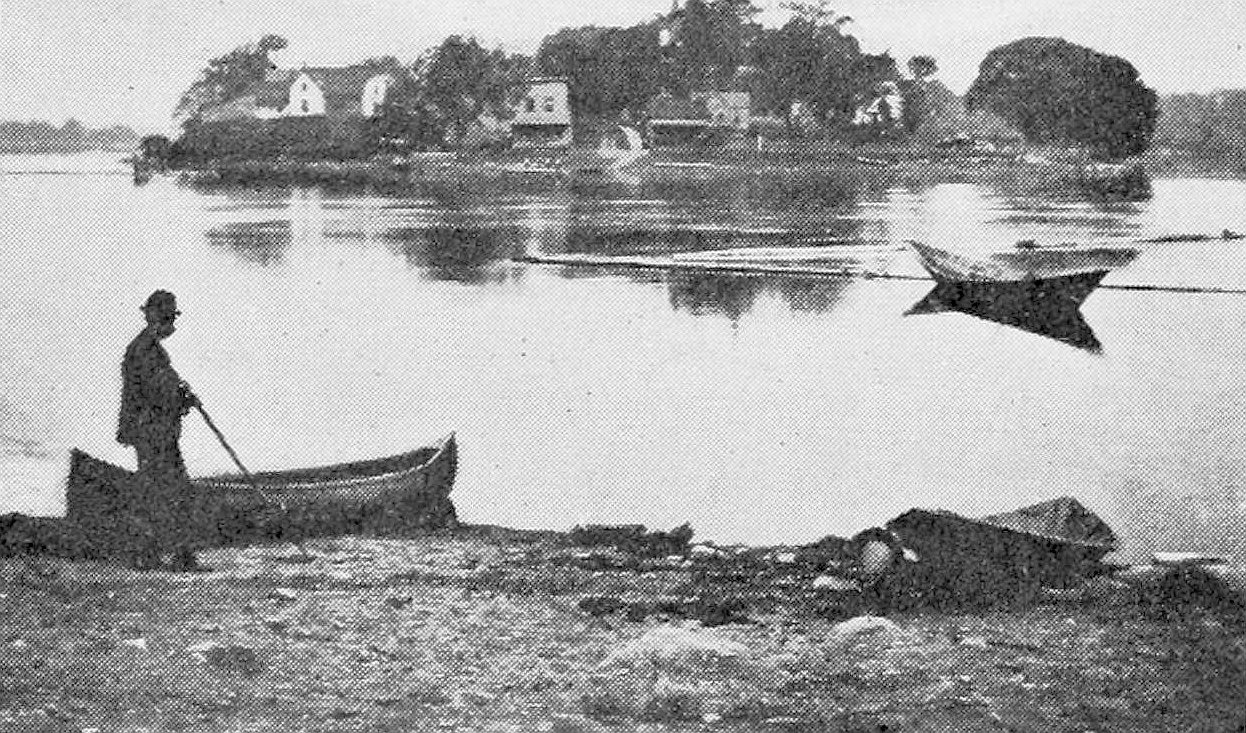
  Indian Island, 1919
- Molly Spotted Elk, dancer, actress, and writer
- Maulian Bryant, Tribal Ambassador
- Morgan Talty, writer

== Geography ==
According to the United States Census Bureau, the Indian reservation has a total area of 22.0 square miles (57.0 km^{2}). 7.5 square miles (19.5 km^{2}) of it is land and 14.4 square miles (37.4 km^{2}) of it (65.70%) is water.

== Demographics ==
Languages (2000)	Percent
Spoke English at home	92.71%
Spoke Abenaki at home	7.29%

As of the census of 2000, there were 562 people, 214 households, and 157 families living in the Indian reservation. The population density was 72.5/mi^{2} (28.0/km^{2}). There were 263 housing units at an average density of 34.0/mi^{2} (13.1/km^{2}). The racial makeup of the Indian reservation was 14.59% White, 84.88% Native American, and 0.53% from two or more races. Hispanic or Latino of any race were 0.53% of the population. As of the 2009 U.S Census Bureau estimate, there were 541 people living in the reservation.

There were 214 households, out of which 44.4% had children under the age of 18 living with them, 35.0% were married couples living together, 25.2% had a female householder with no husband present, and 26.6% were non-families. 22.4% of all households were made up of individuals, and 7.0% had someone living alone who was 65 years of age or older. The average household size was 2.61 and the average family size was 2.97.

In the Indian reservation the population was spread out, with 33.3% under the age of 18, 6.6% from 18 to 24, 31.3% from 25 to 44, 19.2% from 45 to 64, and 9.6% who were 65 years of age or older. The median age was 32 years. For every 100 females there were 92.5 males. For every 100 females age 18 and over, there were 84.7 males.

The median income for a household in the Indian reservation was $24,653, and the median income for a family was $24,000. Males had a median income of $34,500 versus $23,194 for females. The per capita income for the Indian reservation was $13,704. About 23.5% of families and 22.7% of the population were below the poverty line, including 28.3% of those under age 18 and 6.1% of those age 65 or over.

== Education ==
Its school district is the Indian Island School District, which stands for the Indian Island School, a K-8 school that is one of Maine's three schools for Native Americans.

Feeder public high schools for Indian Island School include Old Town High School and Orono High School. Some students attend John Bapst Memorial High School, which is a private school in Bangor.

== In popular culture ==
The climax of the 1825 novel Brother Jonathan by Maine native John Neal is set on Indian Island during the American Revolutionary War. The novel features a protagonist of mixed Penobscot-English descent and describes the island as "the last encampment of the Penobscot Red men".
