= List of mayors of Old Town, Maine =

The following is a list of mayors and council presidents of the city of Old Town, Maine, United States.

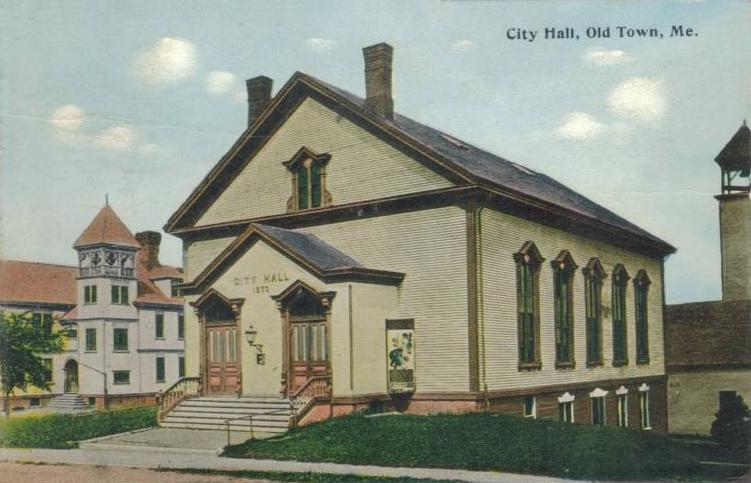
View of City Hall building in Old Town, Maine, circa 1914

== Mayors ==
- Geo. H. Hunt, 1891
- M. M. Folsom, 1892
- G. Gilmore Weld, 1893, 1907
- Herbert Gray, 1894-1895
- Eben T. Hartwell, 1896
- Edgar B. Weeks, 1897–1900, 1908–1909, 1922-1924
- George P. Longley, 1901, 1925
- Arthur J. Bradbury, 1902-1903
- H. Franklin Bailey, 1904
- Wm. H. Waterhouse, 1905
- Charles G. Davis, 1906
- Chas. W. Stephens, 1910-1912
- Chas. G. Davis, 1913
- Geo. P. Longley, 1914
- John H. Hickey, 1915, 1926-1929
- John W. Gould, 1916
- W. H. Waterhouse, 1917-1918
- Alfred J. Keith, 1919
- Ira E. Pinkham, 1920
- C. W. Stephens, 1921
- Stephen Bussell, 1930-1931
- Alexander Latno, 1932-1933
- Edgar F. Cousins, 1934-1946

== City council presidents ==
- Peter Dufour, 1958, 1975
- G. Howard Shirley, ca.1966
- Donald H. McKay, ca.1967
- John L. Cashman, 1969
- Francis Preble, 1970
- Richard Needham, 1971
- Michael Pearson, 1972
- John Lord, 1973
- Barbara Everett, 1974
- Janet Klitch, 1976
- Eugene Paradis, 1977
- John Cashman, 1978
- Thomas Richards, 1979-1980
- William Osborne, 1981
- John A. Cashman, 1982
- Leon Cote, 1983, 1985-1988
- C. Clark Young III, 1984
- Donald Spencer, 1989-1992
- Roberta Fowler, 1993
- Virginia Fortner, 1994
- Al Duplessis, ca.1995
- Robert Fiske, 1997
- Mary Bailey, 1998-1999
- Scott Cates, ca.2000-2001
- Mike Wickett, 2001-2002
- Alan Reynolds, 2003
- Alan Stormann, 2004
- Gary Sirois, ca.2005-2006
- Jamie Dufour, ca.2012
- David Mahan, ca.2020
- Kyle Smart, 2021
- Tim Folster, 2022
- Christian Pushor, ca.2024

== See also ==
- Old Town history
