= Edith Marion Patch =

American entomologist (1876–1954)

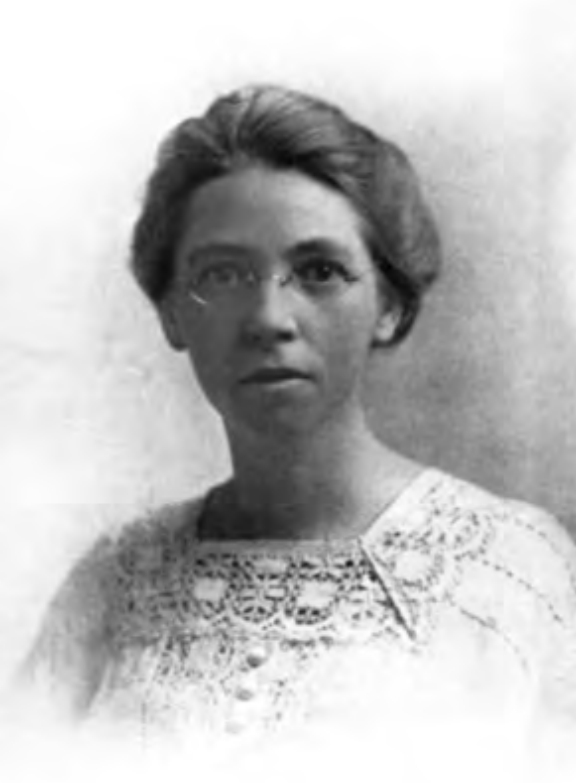
- Born: 27 July 1876; Worcester, Massachusetts, USA
- Died: 28 September 1954 (aged 78); Old Town, Maine, USA
- Education: University of Minnesota; University of Maine
- Alma mater: Cornell University
- Known for: First Female President of the Entomological Society of America. Study of aphids.

Edith Marion Patch (27 July 1876 – 28 September 1954) was an American entomologist and writer. Born in Worcester, Massachusetts, she completed a BSc at the University of Minnesota in 1901, treaded water in her career teaching English when she was selected as an intern in the Maine Agricultural Experiment Station at the University of Maine. Her elevation as head of the entomology department in 1904 was met by the misgivings from several male colleagues, despite not completing an MA at the University of Maine until 1910, followed by a Ph.D. at Cornell University in Ithaca, New York in 1911. She would retire from the post in 1937. Patch is recognized as the first truly successful professional woman entomologist in the United States.

During her career, she was recognized as an expert on aphids and published Food Plant Catalogue of the Aphids in 1938. She was elected president of the American Nature Study Society and in 1930 became the first female president of the Entomological Society of America. Patch's residence in Old Town, Maine, was added to the National Register of Historic Places in 2001.

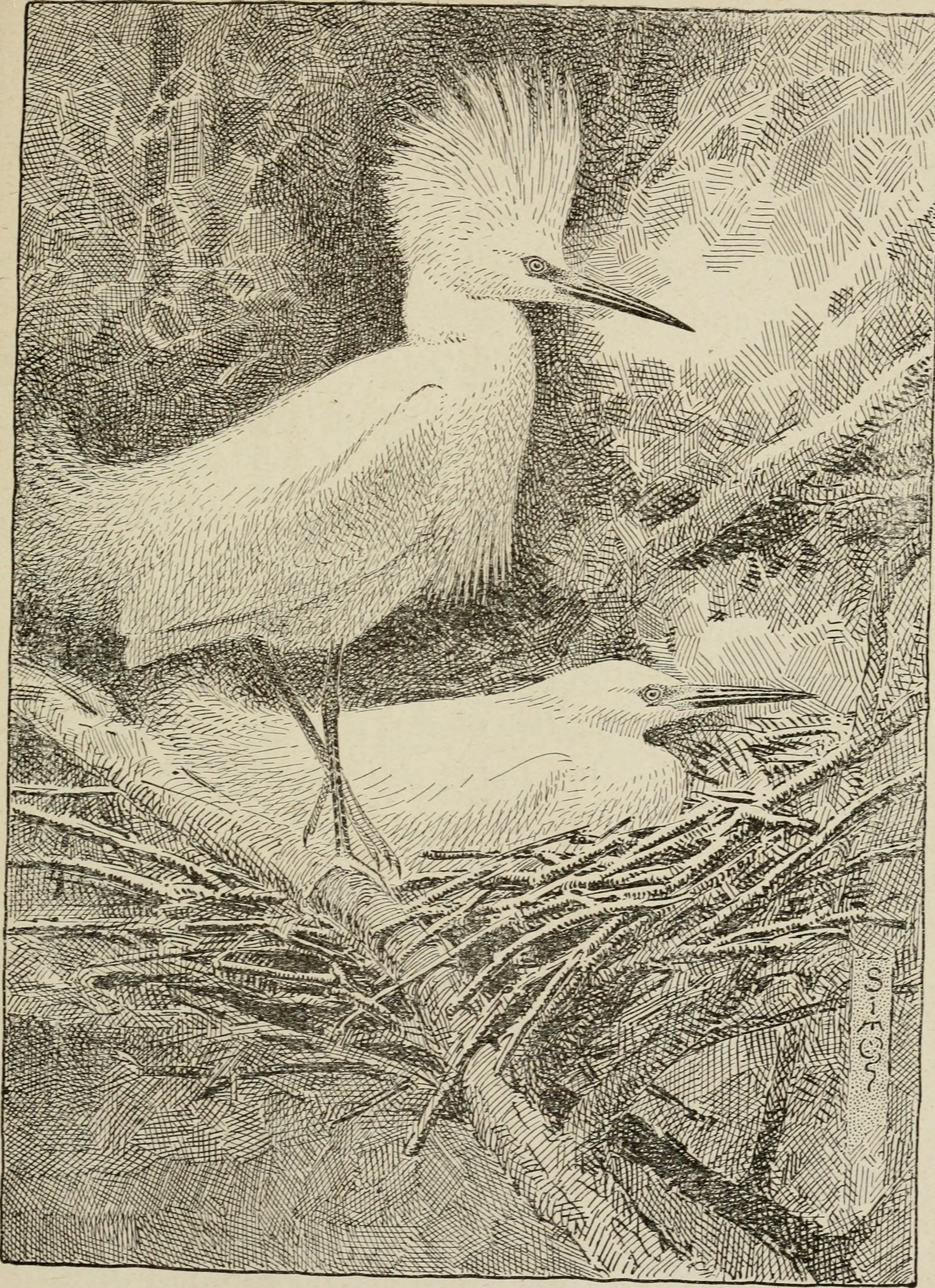
Bird Stories

== Early life ==
Edith Marion Patch was the youngest of six children of William Whipple Patch Jr. and Salome Jenks. After the American Civil War, the family moved to New Vinton, Iowa but returned to Worcester in 1872. Her interest in natural history became evident at an early age and she used to ramble near her home, studying its flora and fauna. The family moved to Minneapolis, Minnesota in 1881, when she was eight and then into the countryside two years later, when she was able to resume her interests in natural history. She was sufficiently knowledgeable while still at school to write an essay on the monarch butterfly which won her a prize in a competition. She invested her $25 prize in a copy of John Henry Comstock's "Manual for the Study of Insects" with illustrations by Anna Botsford Comstock. After graduating from Minneapolis's South High School in 1896, Patch went to the University of Minnesota, graduating with a BSc in 1901. At first she was unable to find suitable employment as an entomologist and spent two years teaching English at a high school, but she got her chance when Dr. Charles D. Woods offered her an unpaid post. The job was at the University of Maine in the Maine Agricultural Experiment Station to start up an entomology department. Woods decision to appoint based on merit and not gender was vindicated when she was granted a full-time job the following year.

== Career ==
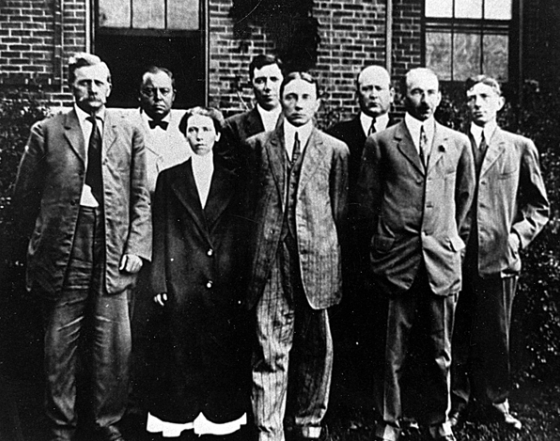
Patch and other staff at the Maine Agricultural Experiment Station c. 1915

Patch was always concerned with the practical applications of entomology and wrote bulletins about the pests of agricultural and horticultural crops of Maine and forest trees. Her specialism was the aphid family with their complex life histories, their capacity to transmit viruses and their alternating host plants. She may have been influenced in this choice by the fact that she had worked with Professor Oestlund, an expert on aphids, in Minnesota before going to University. She remained at the University of Maine throughout her career, obtaining her master's degree in 1911 and her doctorate from Cornell University a year later. While at Cornell, she became friends with the Comstock family. She published about eighty scientific papers on aphids, their identification, their biology and the role they played in the environment. She made the important discovery that the eggs of the melon aphid overwintered on a weed, (Sedum purpureum), and that removing this weed from the vicinity reduced infestation of crops the following year. In 1938, she published an important book, the Food Plant Catalogue of the Aphids, which listed her discoveries on the host plants used by different species of aphids.

She also published articles in the Maine Agricultural Experiment Station Bulletin and wrote others for the general public in horticultural magazines and the Atlantic Monthly Magazine, the Maine naturalist and the Scientific Monthly Magazine. She realised how useful beneficial insects could be in controlling pests and disapproved of the indiscriminate application of pesticides. In this, her ideas pre-dated Rachel Carson and her Silent Spring by forty years. Patch made an extensive collection of Aphididae which is maintained as part of the Canadian National Collection in Ottawa. It contained both winged and wingless forms of each species and has been widely used by researchers. She was considered a world authority on aphids and had two genera, five species and one sub-species named in her honor. She herself was the author of a number of newly described species.

In 1924, Patch became the first woman to head the Maine Agricultural Experiment Station. In 1926, she was named to the Committee of Nomenclature for the American Association of Economic Entomologists, later to become the Entomological Society of America.

Patch was elected president of the American Nature Study Society in 1930. The same year, she also became the first female president of the Entomological Society of America at a time when this male-dominated society admitted few women. Toward the end of her career, the University of Maine awarded her an honorary doctorate in 1937, and in 1940 she was inducted into the honorary scientific fraternity Sigma Delta Epsilon.

== Writing career ==
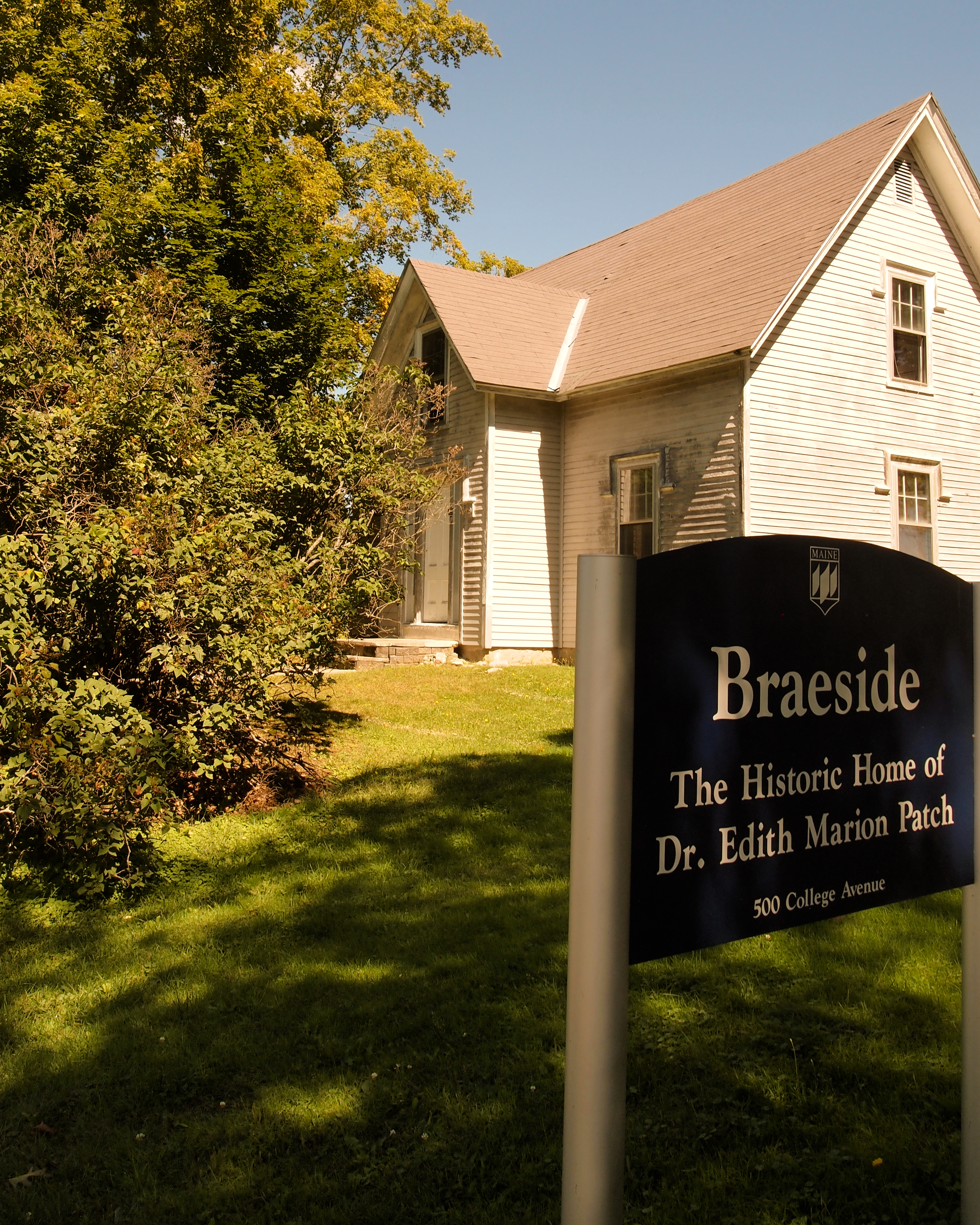
Patch's 50-acre home beside the Stillwater River in Old Town, Maine

After acquiring her PhD, Patch embarked on writing books and magazine articles on natural history for children, designed to stimulate their interest and enthusiasm for the natural world. They were published at first by the Pine Cone Publishing Company in Orono, which seems to have been her own enterprise. In 1913, Patch published Dame Bug and her Babies, a collection of 18 stories about insect mothers and their young. This invoked a passion in Patch to continue to educate young minds about nature through her writings. An additional publishing, Little Gateways to Science, told the story of 12 birds and the unpropitious effects human activity can have on the natural world. Later, after her reputation as a natural history writer for children was established, she was taken on by the better known Macmillan Publishers. With them she produced the Holiday Series, on the wildlife and plants found in various habitats, the Neighbor Series, with information on wild animals in their natural settings, and the Science Readers for schools, covering scientific topics for children up to eighth grade.

== Patch House ==
In 1913, Patch purchased an old farmhouse with fifty acres of land at Old Town, Maine and lived there for the rest of her life. She called the house "Braeside" but it later became known as "Patch House". Built in the 1840s, "Braeside" is a derivative of the Scottish word brae meaning bank, which refers to its location alongside the Stillwater River. The property consists of 50 acres of wild garden, home to bustling societies of insects where Patch spent most of her free time studying and writing about the natural world. It passed into the possession of the University of Maine after her death and was used for student accommodation. By the 1990s it was deemed to be in violation of various codes of safety and was destined for demolition, and an arrangement was made to allow it to be burned down as a training exercise for firefighters. In 1997, a few days before it was due to go up in flames, activists managed to get it added to Maine's list of most endangered properties and it was saved for posterity. In 2001 it was added to the National Register of Historic Places.

== See also ==
- Timeline of women in science
