= Edith Marion Patch House =

Historic house in Maine, United States

- U.S. National Register of Historic Places
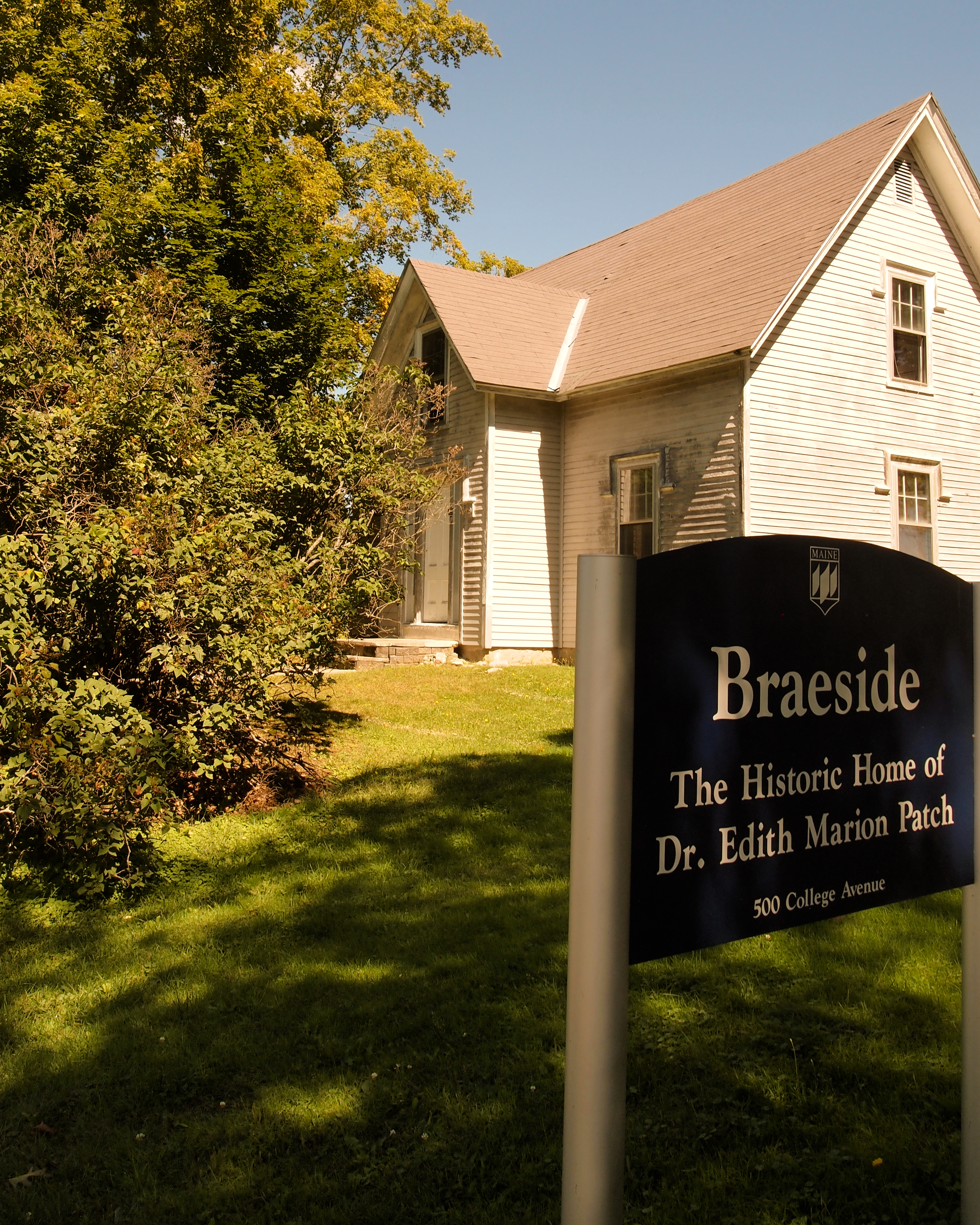

- Location within Maine Location within the United States
- Nearest city: Old Town, Maine
- Coordinates: 44°54′37″N 68°40′35″W
- Area: 2.3 acres (0.93 ha)
- Architectural style: Gothic Revival
- NRHP reference No.: 01001269
- Added to NRHP: November 29, 2001

The Edith Marion Patch House is a historic house at 500 College Avenue in Old Town, Maine. Built about 1837, the house was from 1913 to 1954 it was the home of entomologist and writer Edith Marion Patch. She named the house Braeside for the Scottish bluebells that grew on the property. The house was rescued from demolition in 2000, and plans are in development to establish a research center and museum dedicated to Patch's life and work. It was listed on the National Register of Historic Places in 2001.

== Description and history ==
The Patch House is set on the east side of College Avenue, at the northern end of the campus of the University of Maine, most of which is located in Orono. It is a 1 1/2-story wood-frame Cape style house, three bays wide, with a side-gable roof, clapboard siding. A two-story addition extends to the rear of the main block. The main facade is symmetrically arranged, with a gable-roofed entrance bay flanked by sash windows. The entrance is flanked by sidelight windows and is topped by a molded hood; there is a sash window in the gable above.

The house was built about 1837 and expanded twice, the last time about 1900. Edith Marion Patch purchased the house, which sat on a parcel of land more than 90 acres (36 ha) in size, in 1913. She sold off the land across College Avenue, and lived in this house with her sister Alice. Edith died in 1954, several years after Alice. Patch, a graduate of the University of Minnesota, was hired by the university to work at its agricultural experimental station. She eventually came to head that station, and spent her entire professional career at the university. She published a number of articles in leading journals, and did groundbreaking research on aphids, which were a major crop pest. She retired from the university in 1937, but continued to be active in professional circles.

== Preservation ==
In 1997, the building, owned by the University of Maine, was scheduled to be burned as a training exercise for the Old Town Fire Department. After the Maine Historic Preservation Commission determined that it was eligible for NRHP consideration and it was listed as one of Maine's 10 most endangered historic properties, the University worked with private groups to raise funds for a rehabilitation of the house.

== See also ==
- National Register of Historic Places listings in Penobscot County, Maine
