= Louis Sockalexis =

Penobscot baseball player (1871–1913)

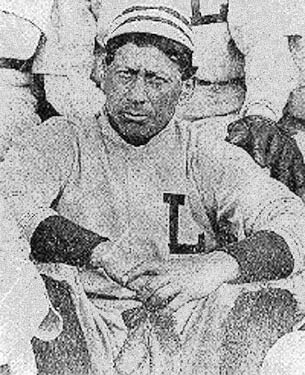
- Outfielder
- Born: October 24, 1871; Penobscot Indian Island Reservation, Maine, US
- Died: December 24, 1913 (aged 42); Burlington, Maine, US
- Batted: Left Threw: Right

Major league debut
- April 22, 1897, for the Cleveland Spiders

Last major league appearance
- May 15, 1899, for the Cleveland Spiders

Major league statistics
- Batting average: .313
- Home runs: 3
- Runs batted in: 55
- Stats at Baseball Reference

Teams
- Cleveland Spiders (1897–1899)

Career highlights and awards
- Cleveland Guardians Hall of Fame

Louis Francis Sockalexis (October 24, 1871 – December 24, 1913), nicknamed "the Deerfoot of the Diamond", was a Penobscot professional baseball player. Sockalexis played in the major leagues from 1897 to 1899 as an outfielder for the Cleveland Spiders. Sockalexis is often identified as the first person of Native American ancestry to play in the National League and Major League Baseball.

== Early life ==
Louis Sockalexis was born on the Penobscot Indian Island Reservation near Old Town, Maine, in 1871. His grandfather was Chief of the Bear Clan. In his youth, Sockalexis' athletic talents were noticeable. It was reported that Sockalexis could throw a baseball across the Penobscot River from Indian Island to the shore of Old Town. Sockalexis and his father entertained crowds at the Bangor Race Track by playing catch across the entire track. He attended High School in Van Buren's St. Mary's.

In the summer of 1893, members of the Holy Cross baseball team played in an amateur "county league" in Maine. Sockalexis played for one of the teams in the league. His hitting, base running, and fielding all stood out to the Holy Cross players. Future Major League Baseball catcher Doc Powers was one of the Holy Cross players, and encouraged Sockalexis to return with them to Worcester, Massachusetts and enroll at Holy Cross.

After completing his secondary education, Sockalexis began his college career in 1894 at the College of the Holy Cross. While there, he participated on the school's baseball, football, and track teams. Sockalexis spent those summers playing baseball in the Trolley League along the coast of Maine. After the end of the 1895–96 baseball season, the Holy Cross baseball coach accepted a position at the University of Notre Dame in February 1897. When that happened, Sockalexis decided to transfer to Notre Dame. In his two seasons at Holy Cross, Sockalexis compiled a .444 batting average.

In 1897, the Notre Dame baseball team played an exhibition game against the New York Giants at the Polo Grounds. In a sign of things to come, Sockalexis had to deal with taunts, racism, and insulting chants during the game. At the same time, sports writers in attendance insulted a delegation of Penobscots who had come from Old Town to watch the game. Amos Rusie, a future member of the Baseball Hall of Fame, pitched that day for the Giants; before the game, Rusie had promised to strike out Sockalexis. Things did not go well for Rusie as Sockalexis hit a home run following Rusie's first pitch.

Sockalexis biographer Ed Rice challenges this account of the Notre Dame-Giants game, writing that there is no known newspaper account of it and it sounds too remarkably like the account that actually occurred when the Cleveland team played the Giants for the first time in the Polo Grounds. When this incident occurred in the professional game, Rice and Society for American Baseball Research member Richard "Dixie" Tourangeau discovered Rusie had a reason to be upset with Sockalexis. It seems earlier in the 1897 season, New York had played a series in Cleveland; in the game Rusie pitched there, the game went into extra innings and Sockalexis got the game-winning hit off Rusie.

However, Sockalexis' career at Notre Dame was short. In an event that foreshadowed future problems, the University expelled Sockalexis not long after he arrived for his problems with alcohol. Although he played exclusively as an outfielder in the majors, Sockalexis played outfield and pitcher while at Notre Dame and Holy Cross.

== Professional career ==
On March 9, 1897, Sockalexis signed a major league contract with the Cleveland Spiders. Just a month later, on April 22, Sockalexis made his major league debut. Just a few months after he was expelled from school, his drinking problems resurfaced. On July 4, 1897, Sockalexis, in an inebriated condition, jumped from the second-story window of a brothel. He severely injured his ankle in the fall. In the five games after the injury, he had nine hits in 18 at bats. However, his fielding was poor. From July 25 until September 12, Sockalexis played in just one game. In that game, he committed two errors. In his first season with the Spiders, Sockalexis hit for a .338 batting average with three home runs and 42 RBIs. In 66 games that season, Sockalexis also had 16 stolen bases.

Burdened by his alcoholism, Sockalexis played just two more seasons of major league baseball. After a mediocre 1898 campaign, in 1899, a combined ownership cartel that controlled both the Cleveland Spiders and the St. Louis Perfectos engineered a 'trade' in which all of Cleveland's best players were assigned to St. Louis—in this way, the St. Louis team would have a shot at the pennant, while the Cleveland team would be allowed to languish. Sockalexis, no longer considered a star, was kept in Cleveland.

After playing just seven games for what is often considered the worst team in major league baseball history, the Spiders released Sockalexis, and his major league career was over. Sockalexis finished his career in the minor leagues and returned to Indian Island to coach juvenile teams in 1901. Five players whom he coached went on to play in the New England League. After playing in the minor leagues in 1902 (Lowell Tigers) and again in 1907 (Bangor White Sox), Sockalexis retired.

== Later life and legacy ==
Sockalexis suffered from tuberculosis and heart trouble in his later years. On Christmas Eve, 1913, Sockalexis died in Burlington, Maine.

Although Sockalexis had a brief career, he faced many obstacles during his time in professional baseball. It was reported that fans of the opposing teams often shouted racial slurs toward him due to his Penobscot heritage. Additionally, fans imitated war whoops and war dances in his presence. Later, when sports journalists attributed his rapid decline to alcoholism, they identified the disease as the inherent "Indian weakness".

The name change of the Cleveland Naps to the Indians in 1915 is attributed by some to a desire to honor Sockalexis. The new name was chosen by sportswriters in honor of the nickname given while Sockalexis played for the Cleveland Spiders.

In recognition of his accomplishments, the American Indian Athletic Hall of Fame has elected Sockalexis. He was joined by his second cousin, marathon runner Andrew Sockalexis, who finished second in the 1912 and 1913 Boston Marathons and in fourth place at the 1912 Olympic Games in Stockholm.

A plaque honoring Sockalexis stands in Cleveland's Heritage Park, beyond center field of Progressive Field.

Sockalexis is interred in the Old Town Cemetery in Old Town, Maine.

== Disputed distinction ==
There is no official position on the part of Major League Baseball as to who was the first Native American to play in the major leagues. In 1963, Baseball Hall of Fame historian Lee Allen wrote a frequently cited article claiming that Jim Toy, a catcher in the early American Association, was the first. This claim has spread widely enough that it is sometimes repeated without citation even in articles praising Sockalexis. In researching his biography of Sockalexis, journalist Ed Rice found only contradictions to Allen's claims, including a death certificate listing Toy's race as white. More to the point, Rice's research indicated that no contemporary reporting on Jim Toy in his playing days referred to him as Native and there is no indication that fans, players, or owners thought Toy was Native.
