= Bud Leavitt Jr. =

American journalist (1917–1994)

- Born: January 13, 1917; Old Town, Maine
- Died: December 20, 1994 (aged 77)
- Occupations: Journalist, broadcaster

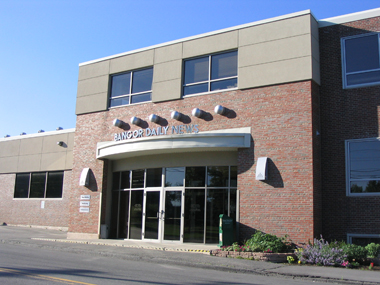
The Bangor Daily News office, where Leavitt worked.

Ralph W. "Bud" Leavitt Jr. (January 13, 1917 – December 20, 1994) was a Maine newspaperman who was executive sports editor of the Bangor Daily News, and a longtime outdoor columnist recognized statewide. In addition to his writing, Leavitt hosted one of Maine's earliest television shows, which was devoted to fishing, hunting and the out-of-doors. Leavitt's stature within the state was such that columnist Roy Blount Jr. wrote of the Maine sportswriter that he "fishes with Ted Williams and Red Smith – or, rather, they trout-fish with him." An early conservationist and son of a paper mill union leader, Leavitt urged the state of Maine to acquire lands for public use; one such preserve is today named for the sportswriter and television personality.

== Early life and career beginnings ==
Ralph W. Leavitt Jr. was born in Old Town, Maine, on January 13, 1917, to Ralph W. Leavitt Sr., union manager at Penobscot Chemical Fiber Company, and his wife Elise. Following graduation from Old Town High School, Leavitt went to work in the plant where his father was manager of the union – and quit the next day. "He didn't like getting all covered with dirt and sweat anywhere but on the athletic field", said Leavitt's cousin Alden Leavitt.

Following his one-day career in the industrial world, Leavitt went looking for other employment. He landed his first newspaper job at age 17 when he began writing for The Bangor Daily Commercial in 1934. At the outbreak of World War II, Leavitt joined the Army Air Corps as a civilian employee. Following the War, in 1946 Leavitt took a job as general sportswriter at the Bangor Daily News, with which he associated as sportswriter, sports editor and outdoor columnist for the next 48 years. Leavitt's retirement from his Maine newspaper duties was considered noteworthy enough that Maine Senator George J. Mitchell issued a statement about it.

During his tenure as sports editor and outdoor columnist, Leavitt also occasionally filed stories to national publications, including Time magazine. High school graduate Leavitt's prose on sporting topics even turned up occasionally in the highbrow The New Yorker magazine. In its issue of June 25, 1979, The New Yorker quoted at length from sportswriter Leavitt's essay on fishing in Maine. "He wrote when the fog shuts out the land, it is like a pussy-footing cat laying down a paw", wrote the magazine, paraphrasing Leavitt's prose. Even Leavitt's admirers concede the columnist and sportswriter wasn't known for his adept turns of phrase. Some observers attributed his popularity in Maine to his no-nonsense, somewhat gruff style, in which he delivered the facts without embroidery.

Leavitt also frequently hunted and fished with his friend Nelson Bryant, outdoor columnist for The New York Times, who wrote about their jaunts in his newspaper. During this time, Leavitt began to make himself indispensable to the Bangor newspaper, where the owners noted that his presence on the sports pages came to embody for many readers the newspaper itself.

In 1948 Leavitt began writing a daily outdoor column for the newspaper in addition to his sportswriter duties. The column, in which Leavitt discussed hunting and fishing and life in Maine, ran in the Bangor Daily News until November 30, 1994, – six years after Leavitt had retired as the paper's sports editor, and only weeks before the columnist's death from cancer.

== The columnist and the television host ==
Leavitt hosted one of the first outdoor shows on national television. In 1953 Maine's first TV station went on the air, and asked Leavitt to anchor a show on the themes he wrote about in his column. The Bud Leavitt Show debuted that year as one of the first local programs on the air in Maine. For the next 20 years Leavitt appeared every Saturday night to talk about the pressing issues of a Maine outdoorsman: how to remove a fishhook; the death of a favorite dog; snoeshowing and moose hunting and salmon fishing. There was little that Bud Leavitt wouldn't fish for. When the salmon runs on the rivers of Maine and New Brunswick tapered off, Leavitt often took to the rips off Maine's Petit Manan Light, where he cast a fly to schools of 25-pound pollock.

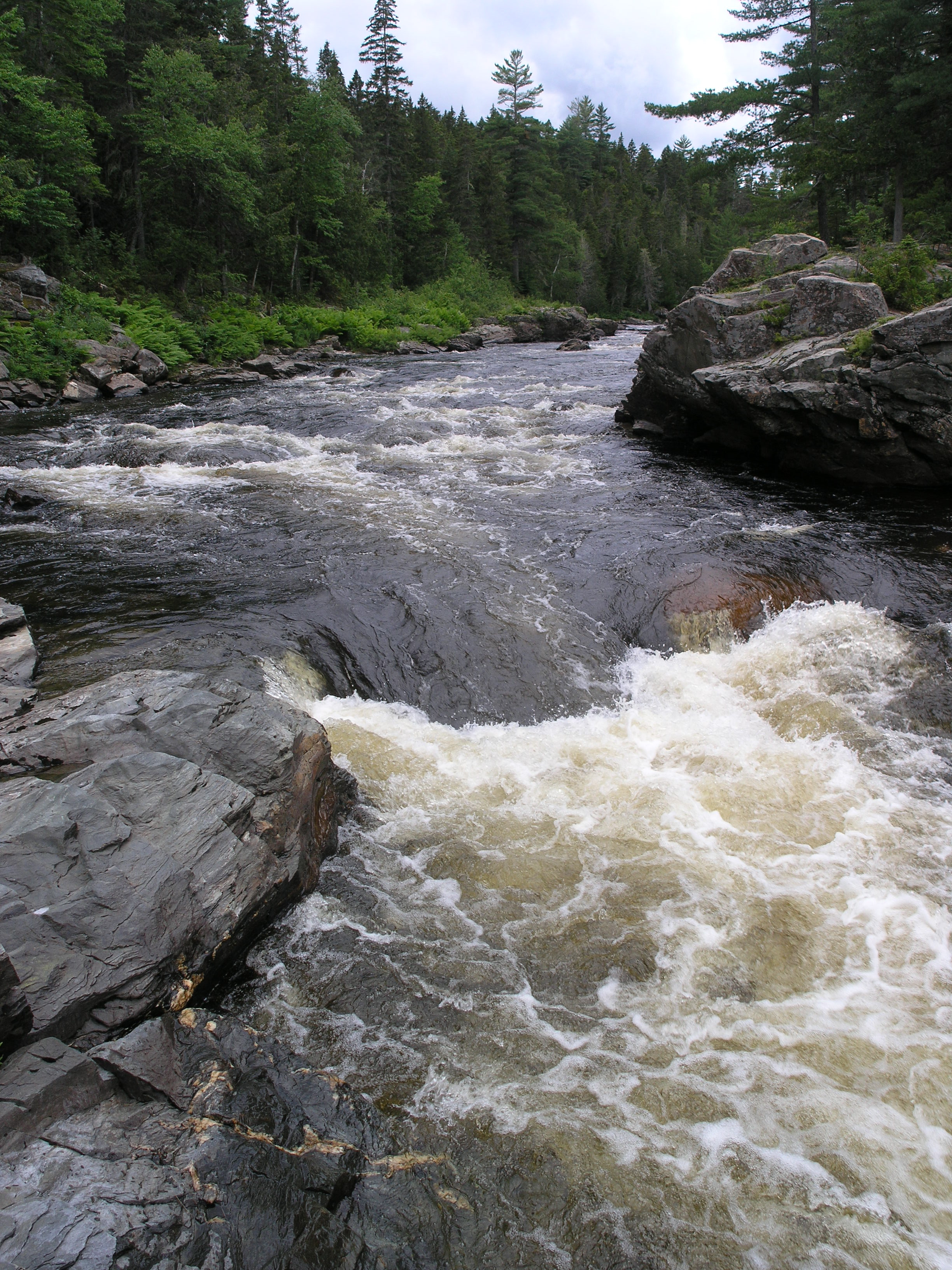
New Brunswick's Miramichi River. Favorite fishing destination of Leavitt.

That Leavitt's newspaper permitted him to appear on a competing news outlet startled no one. "They had to have him", said Bangor Daily News managing editor Mike Dowd of the demand for the popular columnist. "He had to have it. So [Leavitt] became multimedia before the term was invented."

Leavitt's last show on local Maine television was taped in 1973, but in 1978 the Maine Public Broadcasting Network asked the sportswriter to host a new show. Leavitt's early broadcasts on Maine's TV airwaves were marked by the times. The balding, avuncular Leavitt closed each show with the homily, "Remember, the family that plays together stays together." And the show's trademark music jingle is still the subject of Mainers posting to internet message boards, recalling Saturday night with beans and biscuits, watching Bud Leavitt. That show, called Woods and Waters, went on to become a public TV sensation. Within a year it was broadcast nationally. The Outdoor Writers of America later rated it the nation's best outdoor-oriented program. The show's success launched the local Maine sportswriter into the national consciousness: Leavitt was featured as a guest several times on the ABC show American Sportsman, and was a frequent guest on national radio programs.

Sometimes Leavitt was joined on his Maine TV show by friends like broadcaster Curt Gowdy, or baseball players Brooks Robinson or Ted Williams. "He was to outdoor journalism what Norman Rockwell was to art", wrote longtime Bangor Daily News sports columnist Larry Mahoney. The comparison was apt. Leavitt was not known for his eloquent turns-of-phrase, but for his directness and lack of artifice—what some might call his "Maine-ness".

Thanks to his notoriety, Leavitt kept a running correspondence with people that he might never have met. His friendship with Albany, New York mayor Erastus Corning 2nd, for instance, lasted decades, and the pair's letters about angling are among the papers collected in Corning's archives.

Leavitt's friendship with baseball player Ted Williams spanned decades, and the two were frequent fishing buddies. Leavitt had been sent to Boston's Fenway Park in 1939 to write about the Boston Red Sox, where he met Williams, then a first-year rookie already making a name for himself as a slugger. Overhearing that the cub sportswriter was from Maine, Williams asked about the fishing up north. A lifelong friendship ensued.

"One journalist with whom Williams had a genuine friendship was the late Bud Leavitt, former sports editor and outdoor writer for the Bangor Daily News", wrote Tony Chamberlain of The Boston Globe. "Leavitt fished often with Williams in the lakes and streams of Maine and Canada. Most of their fishing up north was for salmon, and Williams fished with Leavitt near the writer's home along the Penobscot River."

== Recognition in Maine and later years ==
Leavitt's stature as a writer on some of Maine's favorite topics, and his weekly television presence made him one of the state's celebrities – in the days when the words "Maine" and "celebrity" were oxymorons. Once, on a bird hunting drive in northern Maine with his friends Curt Gowdy and Brooks Robinson, Leavitt got lost. He stopped at a local home where he saw several men talking in the driveway. After inquiring after directions, Leavitt gestured at his car. Did the local Mainers know either of the two men in his automobile, Leavitt asked the group.

"No, we don't", answered one man, "but we sure know who you are. You're Bud Leavitt!"

Even Maine Senator Edmund Muskie tested the limits of political muscle when he brushed against Leavitt's following. It was arranged for Muskie to go ice-fishing with Leavitt—or as Muskie adviser Clyde MacDonald Jr. put it, "possibly the greatest political event that could be arranged at that time." MacDonald lived next to columnist Leavitt, whom the Muskie aide inveigled to accompany Muskie on a fishing trip to an Ellsworth, Maine, lake. Muskie landed the prize-winning fish, headlined in the next day's Bangor newspaper. As Muskie recalled, his fishing trip with Leavitt made a deeper impression than most of his electoral efforts. "Muskie throughout the rest of his career would say, 'You know, I fought for Dickey-Lincoln [Dam], and I prevented them from closing Loring, but the thing that people talk about is that fish.'"

Leavitt died on December 20, 1994, and his funeral mass was held in Bangor, not far from his home in Hampden, Maine, on December 26, 1994. His wife Barbara had predeceased him, dying five years prior in 1989. During his career, Leavitt wrote 13,104 columns for Maine newspapers, and a book called, simply, Twelve Months in Maine. Leavitt's essay most often collected in outdoor writing anthologies is "Hunting for Grouse and Woodcock" from his book Twelve Months in Maine. Following his death, the State of Maine named the Bud Leavitt Wildlife Management Area, 6,500 acres (26 km^{2}) of upland forest 25 miles (40 km) northwest of Bangor, in honor of the sportswriter, a longtime advocate for conservation and public lands. In 2000, six years after Leavitt's death, the Maine Press Association posthumously inducted Leavitt into its Hall of Fame.

Leavitt is interred, alongside his wife Barbara, at Lakeview Cemetery in Hampden, Maine.

== Works ==
- Bud Leavitt and Senator William S. Cohen, Bangor: The Twentieth Century, Vol. II, Images of America, Richard R. Shaw, Arcadia Publishing, 1997 ISBN 0-7385-3703-9
- Twelve Months in Maine, Bud Leavitt, Bangor Publishing Company, Bangor, Maine, 1977
