= Andrew Sockalexis =

American distance runner

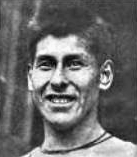
- Born: January 11, 1892; Old Town, Maine
- Died: August 26, 1919 (aged 27); South Paris, Maine
- Occupation: Athlete
- Spouse: Pauline Shay (m. 1913)

Andrew Sockalexis (January 11, 1892 – August 26, 1919) was an American track and field athlete who competed in the 1912 Summer Olympics.

== Early life ==
Andrew Sockalexis was born on January 11, 1892, in Old Town, Maine, a member of the Penobscot Indian Nation. His older cousin was baseball player Louis Sockalexis. He grew up on the Penobscot Indian Island Reservation. He was ten years old when he started to run. His father had built a track and encouraged Andrew to run. As he grew older, Andrew found other routes and trails to run on. Many times he would run four or five times around an island trail that he trained on. At a very young age, Andrew was determined to become a marathon runner. Andrew ran all throughout the year. In the winter months he would run on the river ice with spiked running shoes, and the rest of the year he trained on the numerous trails that spanned his island home. Andrew was timed at thirteen minutes for a trial that was the distance of 2.7 miles.

== Career ==
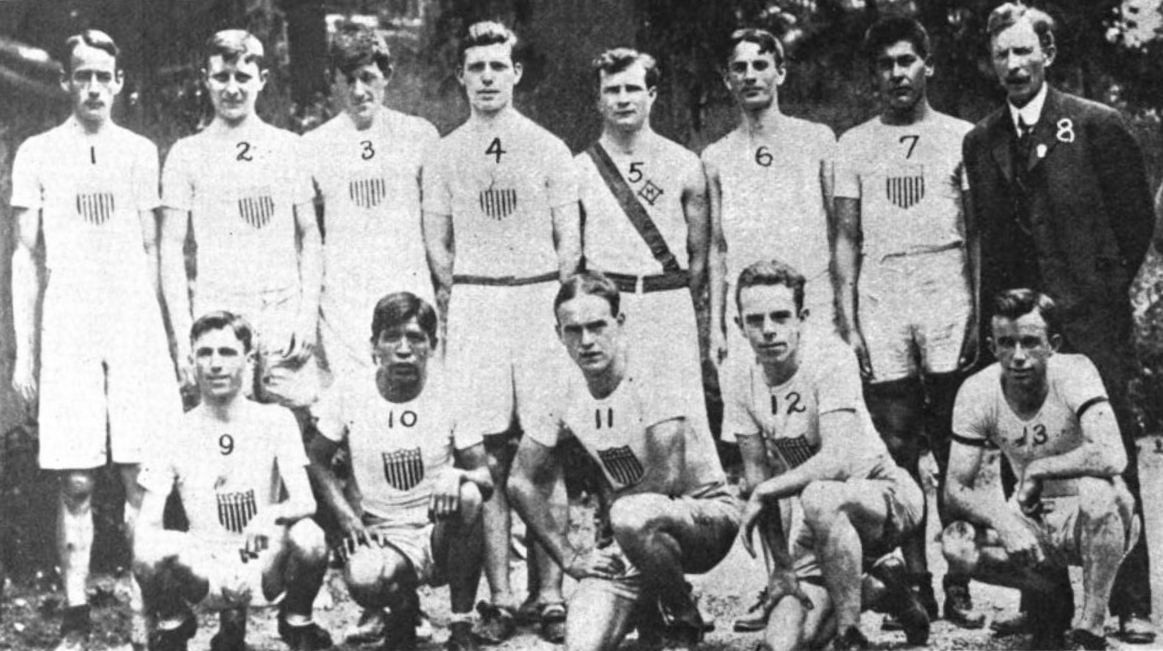
The U.S. Marathon Team at the 1912 Olympics. Sockalexis is in the back row, second from right.

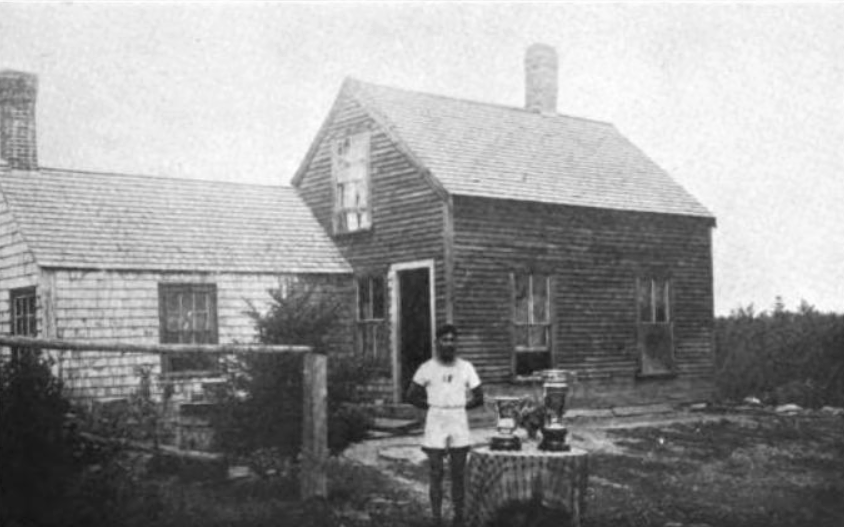
Sockalexis at his home in Old Town

As a young man, Andrew had training from Tom Daley of Bangor and Arthur Smith of Orono. Tom Daley trained Andrew until he was 18 years old. In 1911, Arthur Smith, the track coach of the University of Maine, prepared Andrew for the United States Olympic Team tryouts held at Harvard University. He qualified with eleven other runners for the marathon. Andrew participated in the 1912 Olympics hosted by Sweden. The United States marathon team was sponsored by the Dorchester AA team. Andrew was quoted by a newspaper that at all times he was running not only for the United States but also for his own people, the Penobscot. Coach Smith stated to the newspapers that the United States was very confident in their chances of winning the Olympic marathon. Andrew finished fourth place with a time of 2:42:07, five minutes behind the winner. Harold Reynolds, the Boston Post Commissioner, stated that Andrew finished strong and running like the champion he should have been. When Andrew returned home from the Olympics, he received a royal welcome as though he had won the marathon. He was invited to run in many races around New England. Andrew completed the Boston Marathon in 1912 and 1913, finishing second both times.

== Personal life ==
Andrew married a fellow Penobscot, Pauline Shay, from his reservation village at Indian Island, Maine on November 16, 1913.

== Later years and death ==
Andrew died on August 26, 1919 in the town of South Paris, Maine at the age of 27, after a long illness. The circumstances of his illness and eventual death are unclear. According to one historical account:

In 1916, Andrew ran his last race. It was a 15-mile race from Old Town to Bangor. Andrew was suffering from a severe cold and complained of chest pains. Against his doctor's warnings, Andrew insisted on running the race. Andrew ran with the bad cold and ahead of the field of runners from the start of the race. As they came to the 12 mile marker, Andrew was ahead of his friend Clarence DeMar by a couple of hundred yards and was easily going to win the race. Andrew crossed the finish line in Bangor and as he stopped running, he started to cough up blood and collapsed. Soon after the race, Andrew was diagnosed with tuberculosis, a disease that had plagued his family. Andrew was very sick for three years and in the summer of 1919, he died in the town of South Paris, Maine at the age of 27.

However, author Ed Rice calls this account into question, in his book Native Trailblazer. In the chapter "The Race That Did Not Happen," Rice states the year itself, 1916, disproves this account of such a race for several reasons. First, in the summer of 1913, Sockalexis became a professional runner. He could no longer go to amateur races, and DeMar would have forfeited his amateur status if he raced against Sockalexis at any time after 1913. DeMar won six of his men's record seven victories at the Boston Marathon starting in the early 1920s, which alone makes the account a fabrication. Further, DeMar was detected as having a heart murmur at the 1911 Boston Marathon and, for both personal and moral reasons (World War I), he took a long hiatus from long-distance running all during the teen years. Finally, Andrew Sockalexis suffered bouts with sickness in both 1912 and 1913, growing so sick that he was first institutionalized for the tuberculosis in 1914 that would ultimately kill him in 1919. There was even a Sockalexis Tag Day in Bangor in 1914 to help with his medical costs. There is no evidence he ever raced again. The above account seems to be blending facts from two separate races: a 1912 19-mile run from Old Town to Bangor where DeMar won and Sockalexis finished second; and a 1913 Memorial Day 15-mile run in Bangor won by Clifton Horne, in which DeMar finished in seventh place and Sockalexis collapsed on the track in his 10th mile.

== See also ==
- Boston Marathon
