= Doris Twitchell Allen =

American psychologist

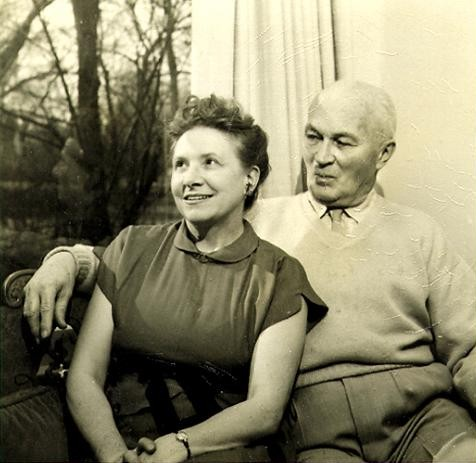
- Allen (left) with her husband, Rusty.
- Born: Doris Frances Twitchell; October 8, 1901; Old Town, Maine
- Died: March 7, 2002 (aged 100); Virginia, United States
- Citizenship: United States
- Education: University of Maine (AB 1923, MA 1926); University of Michigan (PhD)
- Known for: Psychodrama, Children's International Summer Villages
- Spouse: Erastus S. Allen (m. 1935)
- Scientific career
- Fields: Psychology
- Workplaces: University of Maine, Longview State Hospital (Cincinnati, Ohio), University of Cincinnati
- Thesis: An Investigation of Higher Thought Processes (1930)

Doris Twitchell Allen (née Doris Frances Twitchell; October 8, 1901 – March 7, 2002) was a noted American psychologist and the founder of Children's International Summer Villages (now CISV International, CISV). She specialized in development and psychodrama.

== Education ==
After receiving degrees in Chemistry (AB in 1923) and Biology (MA in 1926) at the University of Maine, where she was a member of the national honorary society Phi Kappa Phi, she earned a PhD in Psychology in 1930 at the University of Michigan, and completed her post-graduate study at the Psychological Institute, University of Berlin, in 1932.

== Career ==
Her career as a psychologist began as Director of the Field Laboratory at the Child Education Foundation in New York City (1932–1935). From 1962 until her retirement, she was Professor of Psychology at the University of Cincinnati and Professor of Psychology (Psychodrama) at the University of Maine. She developed several valued tools in the fields of psychology and education, including Social Learning in the Schools Through Psychodrama project and the Twitchell-Allen Three-dimensional Personality Test for use in CISV research and clinical practice to portray personality dynamics, irrespective of age or culture.

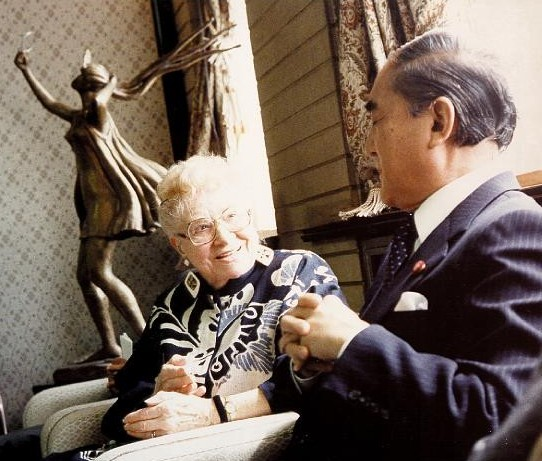
Doris Twitchell Allen, founder of CISV, with the Japanese Prime Minister Nakasone in 1987

In addition to founding CISV in 1951, Doris Allen served as International President (1951–1956), Trustee (1956–1965), Research Chairman (1951–1967), and Honorary Counsellor (1965–2002), and simultaneously served as President (1956–1965), Research Chair / Co-chair (1956–1969) and Life Trustee (1970–2002) of CISV USA. From its inception in 1988, Doris Allen had also served as Trustee / Honorary Trustee of the CISV International Peace Fund Trust.

== Awards and legacy ==
In 1979, Doris was also nominated for the Nobel Peace Prize for her work with CISV.

The Doris Twitchell Allen Village (DTAV) student accommodation blocks at the University of Maine were named after her.

== Personal life ==
In 1935, she married Erastus S. Allen, an attorney.

== See also ==
2001 article Camp Kids Were Given Global Mission in Cincinnati Post
