= Aaron Y. Ross =

Gold miner, stage coach driver and guard, and train guard in the American Old West

- Born: March 22, 1829; Old Town, Maine
- Died: April 3, 1922 (aged 93); Ogden, Utah
- Other names: "Dad" Ross; "Hold the Fort Aaron"
- Occupations: gold miner, stage coach driver ＆ guard, and train guard

Aaron Yearksey Ross (aka "Dad" Ross, "Hold the Fort Aaron"; March 22, 1829 - April 3, 1922) was a gold miner, stage coach driver and guard, and train guard in the American Old West. He was legendary for having fought off a number of robbery attempts, some against overwhelming odds.

== Biography ==
Born in Old Town, Maine on March 22, 1829, Ross sailed to California in 1856 to mine for gold at Sutter's Creek, California, and later in Oregon and Idaho. In 1867, he became a stage coach driver and guard for Wells Fargo. That same year, between Fort Benton and Sun River, Montana his stage was accosted by 25 Native Americans, whom he repulsed in a running battle, killing five. He successfully fought off another robbery attempt by an outlaw gang at Silver Star, Montana and shot and killed the outlaw Andrew Jackson "Big Jack" Davis in Nevada in 1877 during another failed stage robbery. For one or more of these exploits, Wells Fargo gave him a $650 gold watch.

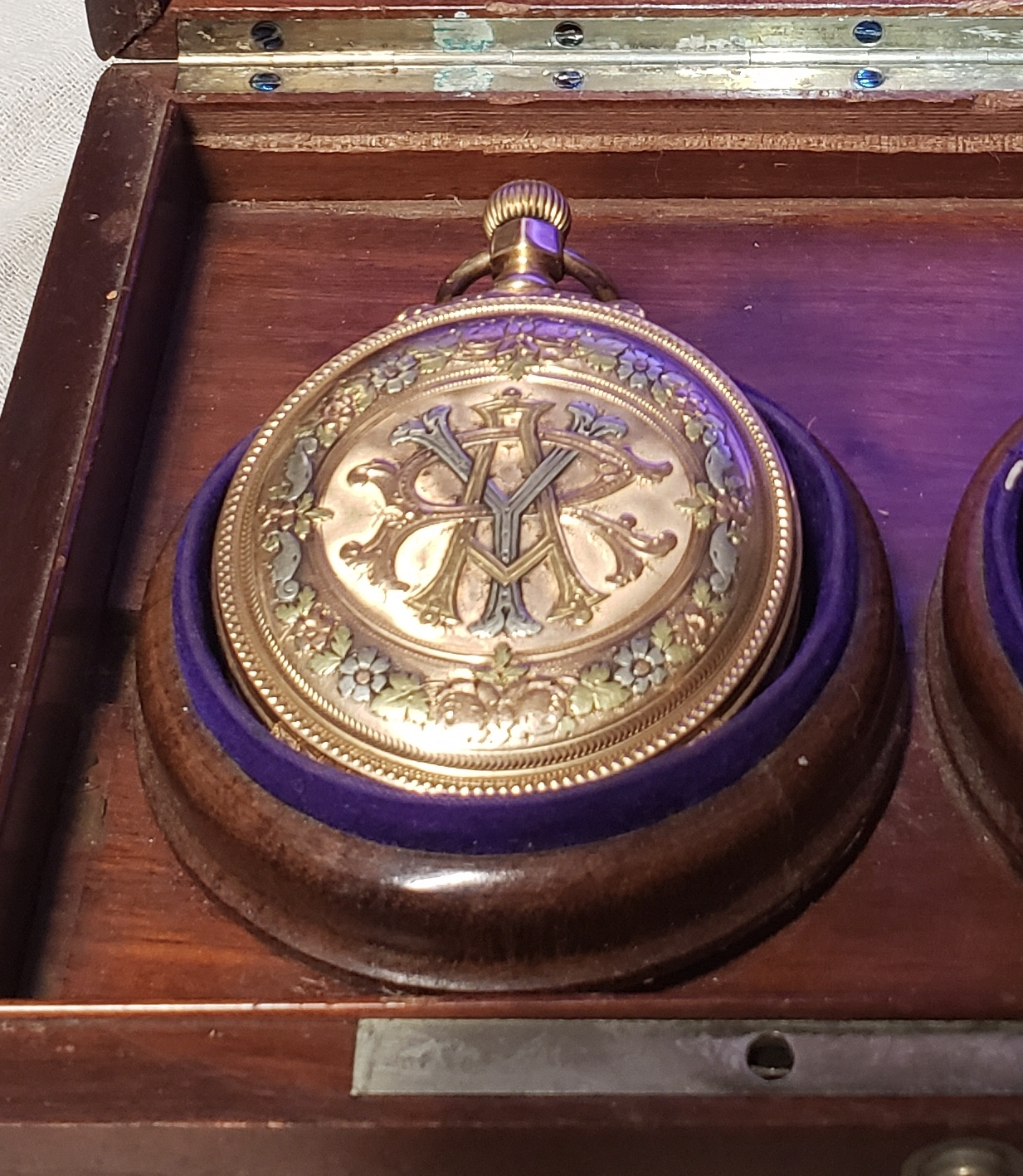
E. Howard & Co watch given to Aaron Y. Ross by Wells Fargo E. Howard & Co watch given to Aaron Y. Ross by Wells Fargo

In 1883, at the age of 54, Ross was guarding an express train filled with $80,000 in gold bullion, traveling from San Francisco, when it was attacked by robbers in Montello, Nevada. Fortifying his car, Ross held them off with gunfire until they threatened to burn him out. He reportedly yelled that he'd see them "in a hotter place" than the one they'd make by burning the train. After a five-hour stand-off in which he wounded three, the gang retired and the train reached its destination in Ogden, Utah. The railroad company presented Ross with a $1,000 reward. He retired to Ogden and died there on April 3, 1922, at the age of 93 . His obituary appeared in The New York Times.
