= St. James Episcopal Church (Old Town, Maine) =

Historic church in Maine, United States

- St. James' Episcopal Church
- U.S. National Register of Historic Places
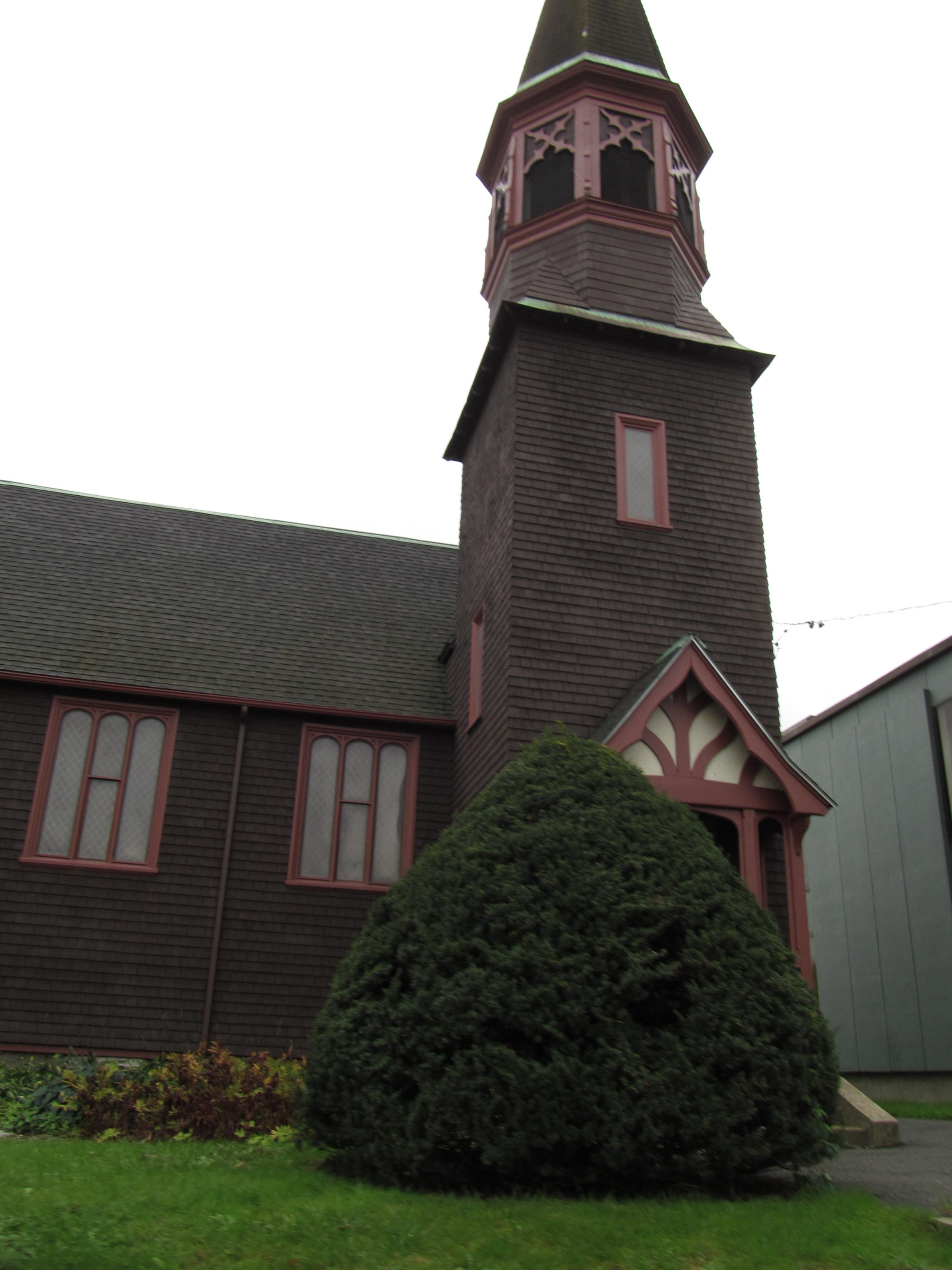

- Location within Maine Location within the United States
- Location: Center and Main Streets, Old Town, Maine
- Coordinates: 44°56′2″N 68°38′47″W
- Area: 0.5 acres (0.20 ha)
- Built: 1892
- Architect: Henry Vaughan
- Architectural style: Late Gothic Revival
- NRHP reference No.: 74000188
- Added to NRHP: November 19, 1974

St. James Episcopal Church is a historic church at Center and Main Streets in the heart of Old Town, Maine. Built in 1892, the church is one of Old Town's few 19th century landmarks, and was listed on the National Register of Historic Places in 1974. Its current minister is the Rev. Jane White-Hassler. The church reported 40 members in 2018 and 46 members in 2023; no membership statistics were reported in 2024 parochial reports. Plate and pledge income reported for the congregation in 2024 was $67,277. Average Sunday attendance (ASA) in 2024 was 26 persons. The congregation is part of the Episcopal Diocese of Maine.

== Description and history ==
The building is a single-story wood frame structure with Gothic Revival styling. It is roughly rectangular in plan, with a gable roof and wood shingle siding, and rests on a stone foundation that was built for the congregation's original church in 1852. The tower projects near the western end of the long north side of the building, housing the main entrance at its ground level. The entry consists of double-leaf medieval doors, sheltered by a gabled portico with half-timbering in the gable end. At the second level the tower has a diamond-paned rectangular window, above which the tower transitions to an octagonal shape, with an open belfry whose openings are topped by Gothic tracery. An octagonal steeple caps the tower. A second section projects from near the eastern end of the northern long side. The gabled ends of the church have simple bargeboard decoration. The interior is relatively unaltered, having suffered minor damage in a 1952 fire.

St. James Parish was organized in Old Town in 1849, and its first church was built in 1852. This church was built in 1892 to replace that deteriorating structure. It was designed by Henry Vaughan, an English architect whose extensive work in the United States includes a number of significant Gothic Revival structures. This is one of four works in the state of Maine known to be his work; the others are St. Andrews Church in Newcastle, and Hubbard Hall and the Searles Science Center at Bowdoin College in Brunswick.

== See also ==
- National Register of Historic Places listings in Penobscot County, Maine
