= St. Anne's Church and Mission Site =

Historic church in Maine, United States

- U.S. National Register of Historic Places
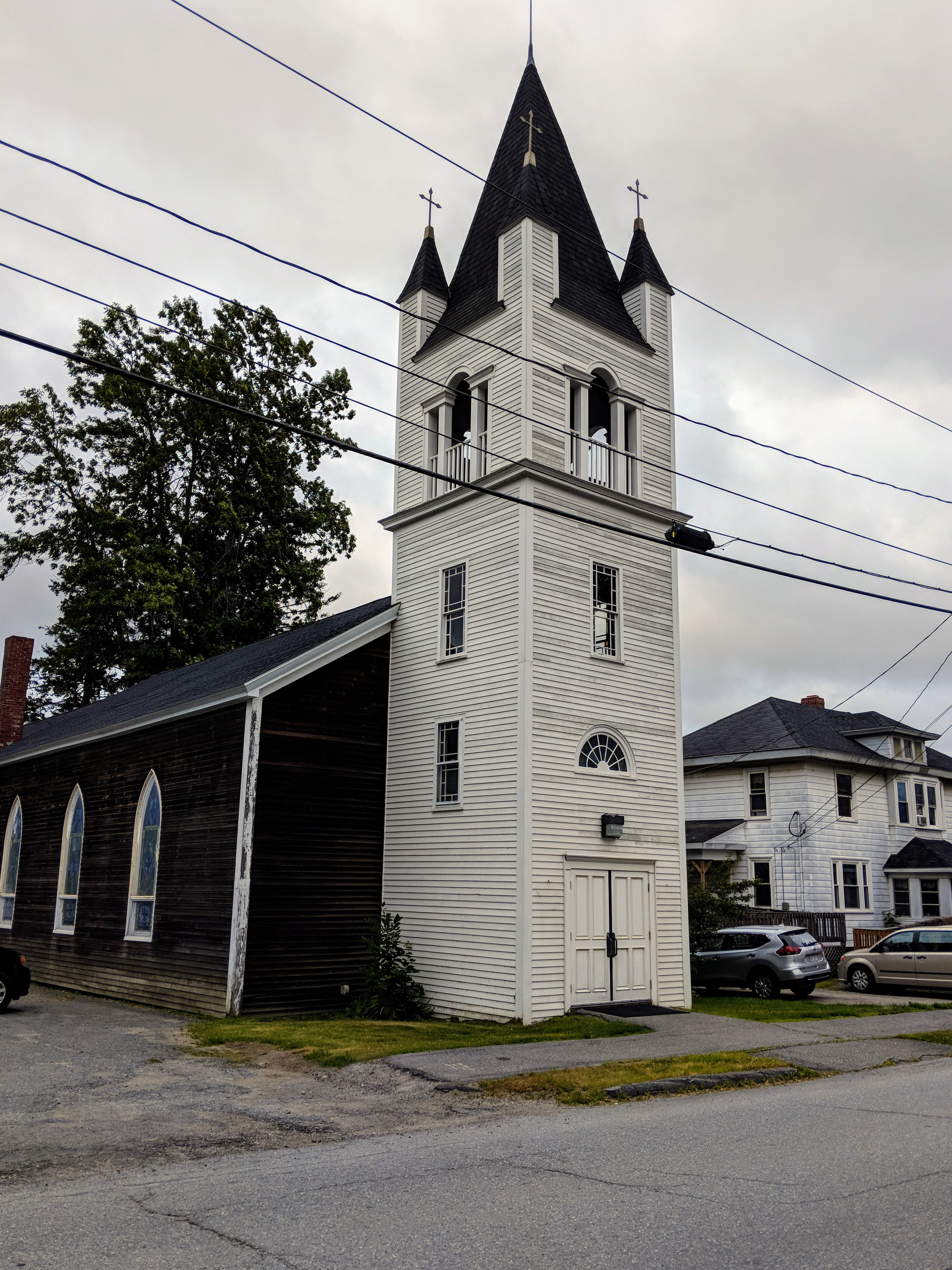

- Location within Maine Location within the United States
- Location: On Indian Island off ME 43, Old Town, Maine
- Coordinates: 44°56′33″N 68°39′10″W
- Area: 1 acre (0.40 ha)
- Built: 1668
- NRHP reference No.: 73000141
- Added to NRHP: November 26, 1973

St. Anne's Church and Mission Site is a historic religious site on Down Street at the southern end of Indian Island in Old Town, Maine, United States. The site includes a church, dating to about 1830, and a cemetery, established in 1668. The mission, with a history dating to 1668, is one of the oldest Roman Catholic establishments in New England, and the building is one of the oldest Catholic churches in the region. The site was listed on the National Register of Historic Places in 1973.

== Description and history ==
St. Anne's Church is located on the east side of Down Street, near the southern end of Indian Island, location of the Penobscot Indian Island Reservation. It is a single-story wood frame structure, with a front-facing gable roof and clapboard siding. The building has had a series of significant alterations, having been originally built with a small tower and belfry on its roof, with an entry in the western facade and a fanlight in the gable. Around the turn of the 20th century, this tower was replaced by the more elaborate square tower seen today projecting in front of the body of the church. The entrance is now at the base of the tower, with the fanlight just above. The tower's fourth stage has Palladian windows on each side, and its pyramidal roof is framed by pinnacles at the corners.

The Catholic mission to the Penobscot Indians was established in 1688 by Louis-Pierre Thury, a French missionary baptized in Quebec in 1667, with the construction of a church building and establishment of a cemetery. The mission was transferred to the Jesuits in 1702, and headed by Antoine Gaulen until 1732. Until 1792 there was no permanent missionary presence, although traveling missionaries and priests would stop to minister to the Penobscots. Beginning in 1792, missionaries were stationed here in the summer, and it was during the tenure of Rev. John Cheverus (1792–98) that the second church was built on this site. The present church was built during the tenure of Rev. Virgil Barber between 1828 and 1830, and was funded by the state. The parish received a full-time priest in 1926.

== See also ==
- National Register of Historic Places listings in Penobscot County, Maine
