= CISV International =

Children's charity based in England

- Founded: 1950; Cincinnati, Ohio, United States; Doris Twitchell Allen
- Type: Non-governmental organization
- Purpose: Peace Education
- Location: Newcastle upon Tyne, England (International Office)
- Website: www.cisv.org

CISV International (formerly Children's International Summer Villages) is an international non-governmental organisation based in the United Kingdom that hosts camp-based programmes and events for children that aim to promote hands-on learning and intercultural friendships with a focus on peace education. Founded in 1950 in Cincinnati, Ohio, the organisation currently serves 69 countries across its 200 local chapters.

CISV International is a UNESCO partner and a Non-Governmental Organization (NGO). It holds participatory status with the Council of Europe and is a candidate member of the European Youth Forum.

== History ==
CISV was founded in 1950, after World War II, by Dr. Doris Twitchell Allen. Since then, the organisation has expanded into around 69 countries, and over 300,000 delegates have participated in more than seven thousand international CISV activities since its founding.

The first village was held in 1951 in Glendale, Ohio; commissioned for its 50th anniversary, the sculpture "How Alike I Am to You” was created in 2000 by Tim Werrell and erected on the property of the Harry Whiting Brown Community Center in Glendale.

== CISV programmes ==
The CISV International delivers its education through its seven official programmes:

- Village: Delegations composed of four children and one adult "leader" from 12 countries come together for a three-week programme for 11-year-old children, who participate in activities based around simple activities that indirectly promote peace and understanding of each other. Each delegation consists of two boys, two girls, and an adult leader. Additionally, there are five or six Junior Counsellors (JCs, age 16–17), who help bridge the gap between the adults and youth. There is also a staff (usually a group of 5-6 adults) that oversee the delegations and facilitate each event.
- Step Up: A three-week programme for participants 14–15 years of age. Delegations include 4 participants—two boys and two girls—and an adult leader. In Step Ups, participants can propose new rules for the camp, which are discussed and voted on during camp meetings. The delegates are also largely responsible for putting together activities to promote social and leadership skills.
- Interchange: A programme that can span up to two years for participants aged 12–14. A delegation of 6–12 youths is selected from each of two participating countries. In the programme, one delegation will travel to visit for two or four weeks with the other's family. After those weeks and a little time in between, the delegations reciprocate. Each delegation has one adult leader, and may also have a Junior Leader. The Interchange programme has been discontinued since 2024.
- Youth Meeting: An 8 or 15 day programme for either 12–13, 14–15, 16–18 or 19+. This programme is based on a specific theme. For youth 12–15 each delegation consists of six young people, and an adult leader. People at the age 16+ travel alone.
- Seminar Camp: A three-week programme for youth aged 16-17, in which there is one or more (but not more than four) delegates from each participating country. Seminar Camps have a more direct educational approach, and youth are encouraged to form opinions on various world issues. Usually youth-directed, this program has only thirty participants in total, and no adult "leaders".
- International People's Project: CISV's newest international programme is open to people aged 19+ and is three weeks long. Participants participate in hands-on work contributing to a local community project.
- Mosaic: Mosaic is a programme that consists of projects with educational content, developed by local CISV Chapters worldwide. These projects empower individuals to be agents of change, reach out, and involve as many people as possible.

CISV Chapters also hold activities that aim to share the CISV experience within their local community.

In addition to this CISV International delivers its education through:

- Junior Branch (JB): Junior Branch is an integral, but self-governing youth-based part of the structure of CISV. Junior Branch develops intercultural skills and attitude through educational and administrative activities consistent with CISV Goals.

== CISV International, National Associations and Chapters ==
The International Office of CISV is located in Newcastle upon Tyne, England in the United Kingdom. The Secretary General of the organization is based there, along with a small team of officers and administrative staff.

CISV International is an umbrella organization, with 68 countries or National Associations (NAs). Each NA oversees and supports its local branches or Chapters. CISV USA is the largest National Association with 27 chapters.

== Gallery ==
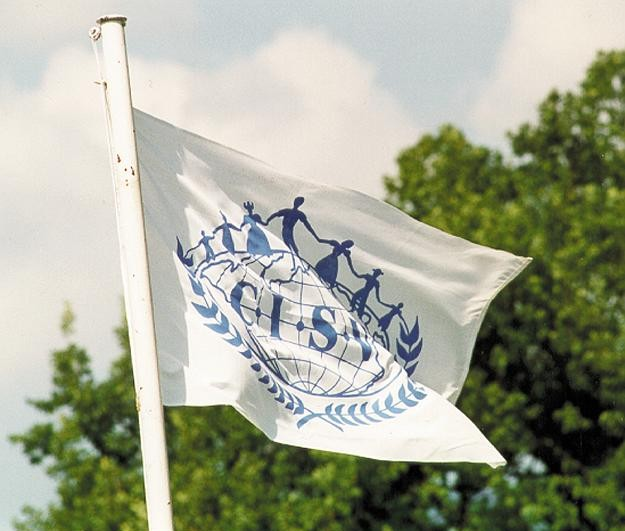
CISV Flag with the previous logo

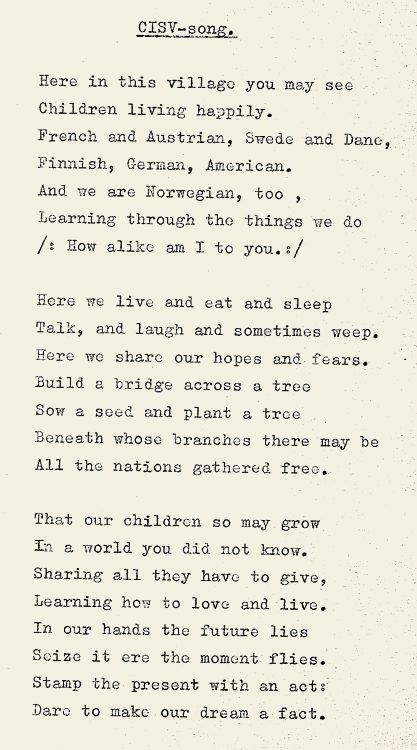
CISV Song

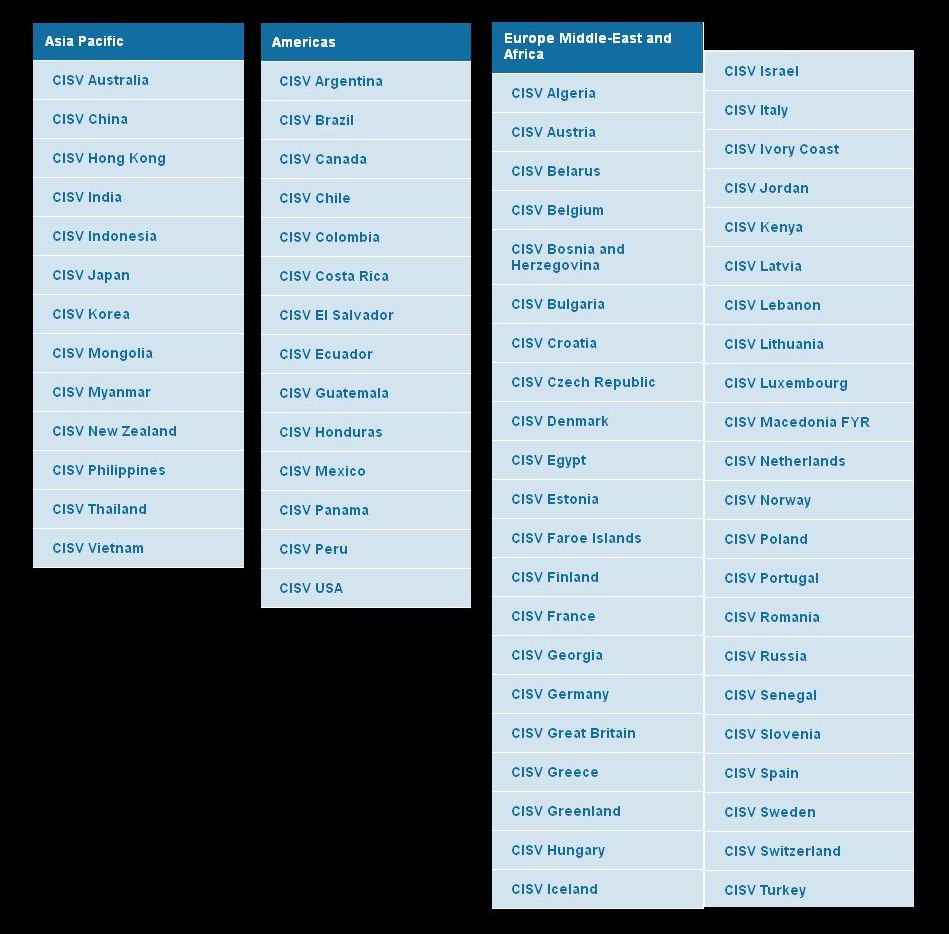
70 countries

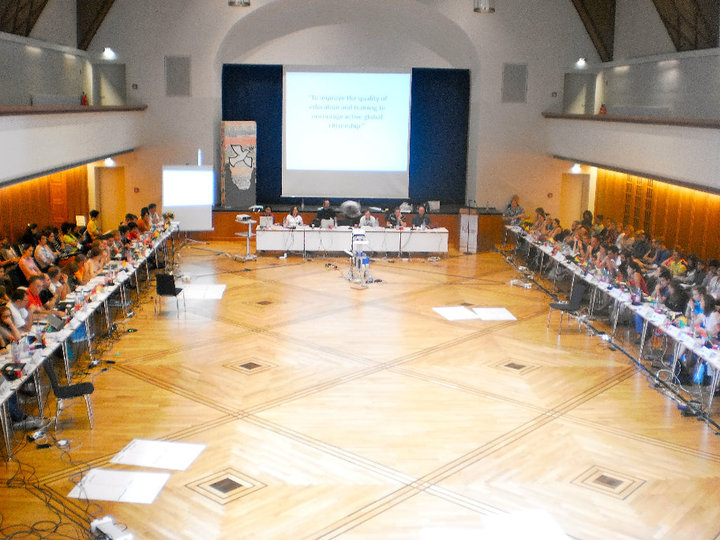
Board of Trustees in session AIM 2010

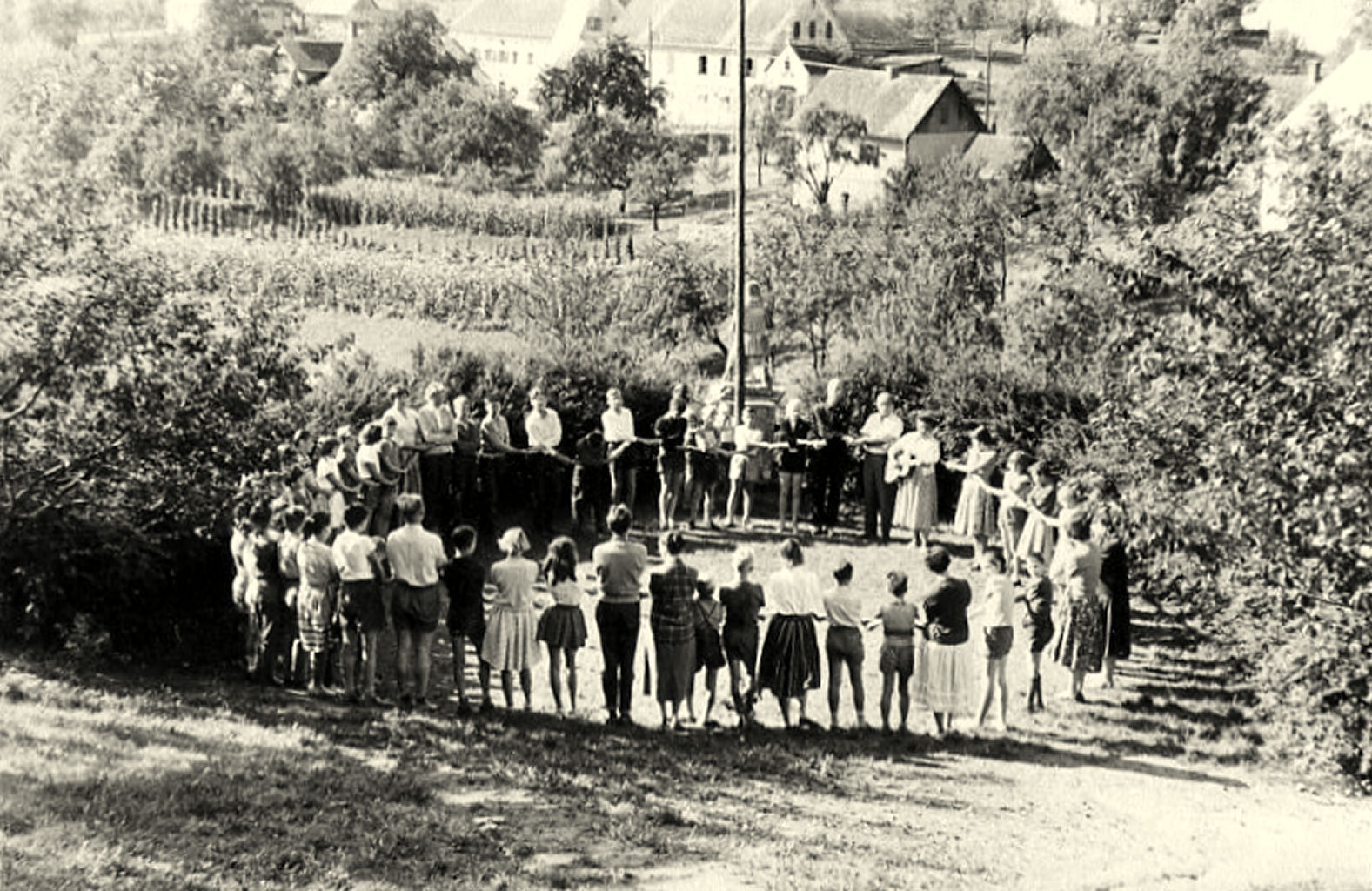
CISV Austria 1958

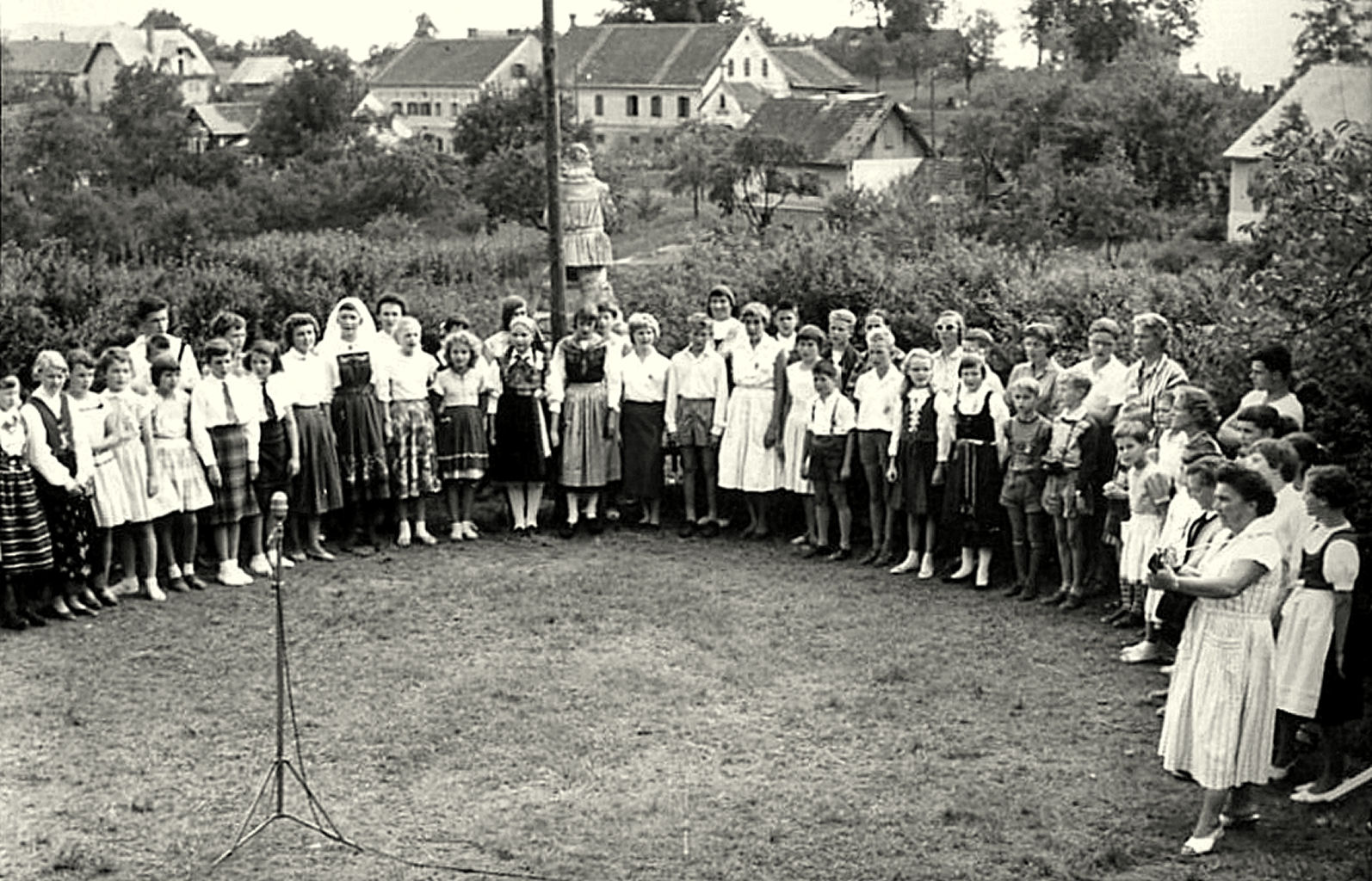
CISV Austria 1958

Junior Branch

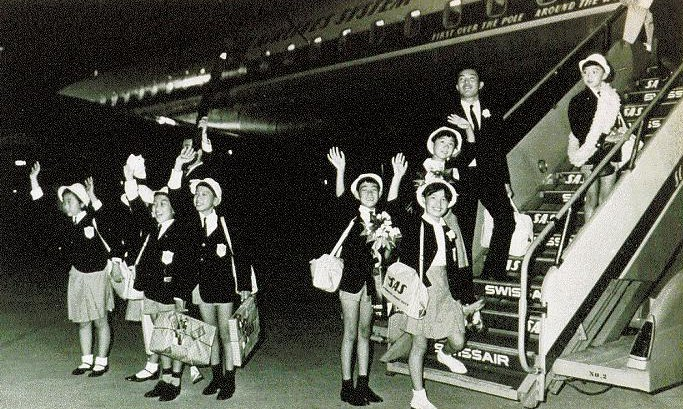
CISV Japanese Village Delegates in 1965

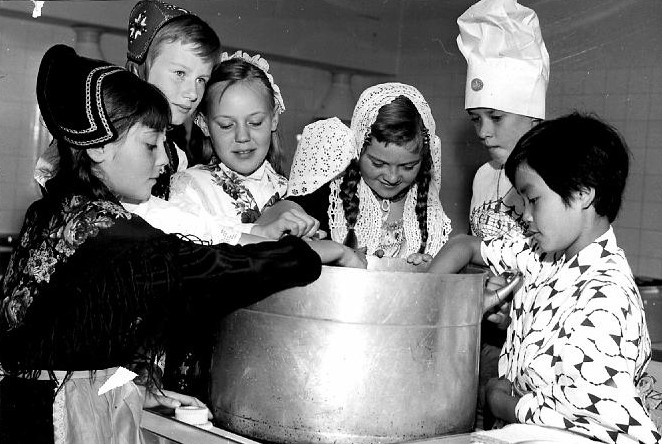
A Japanese and Norwegian delegates in the 1950s

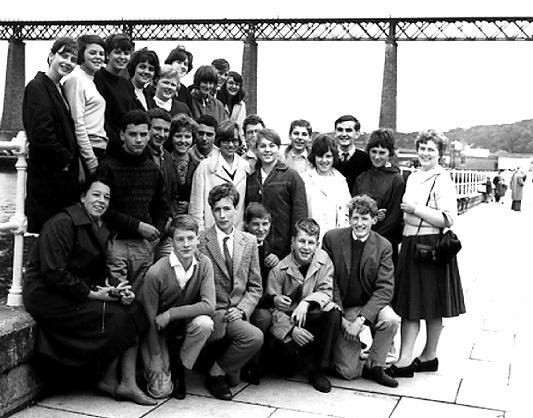
The first CISV Interchange held between Great Britain and Germany in 1962

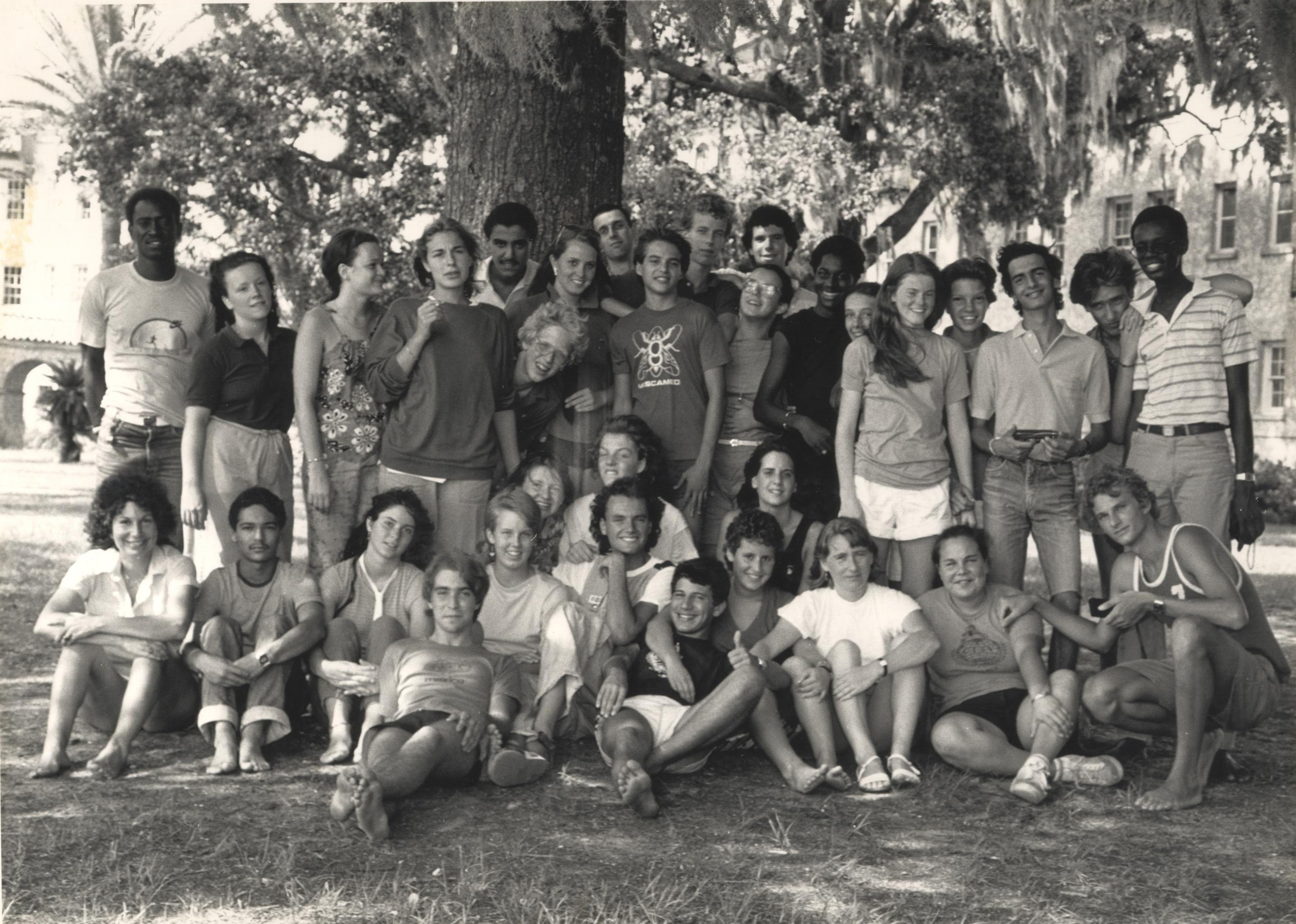
CISV seminar camp, Jacksonville, Florida in 1983

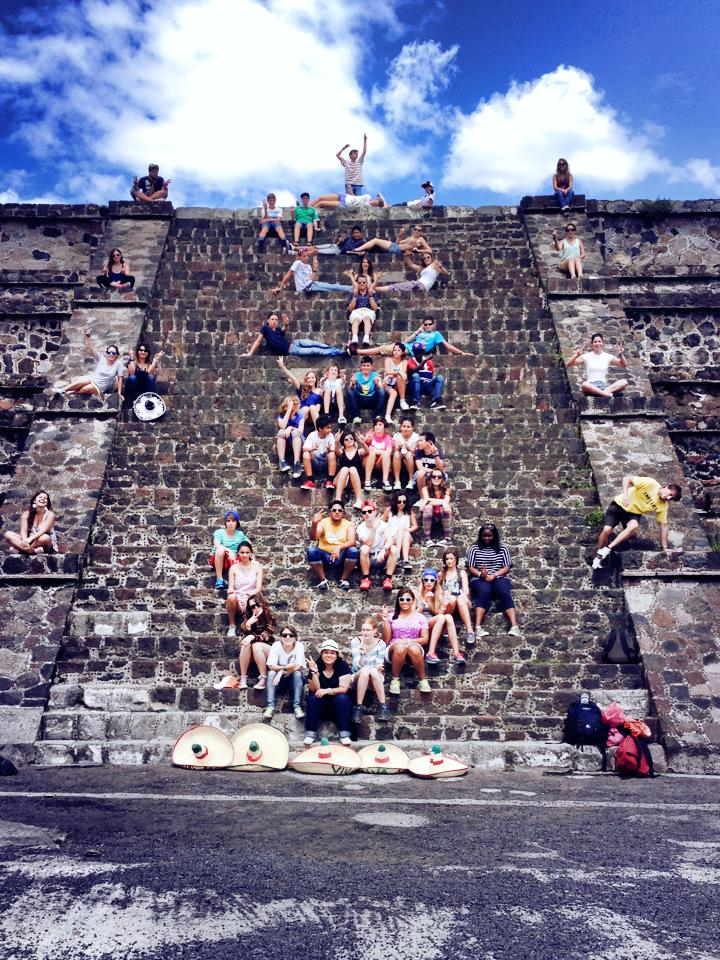
CISV delegates in Querétaro, Mexico on 12 August 2013

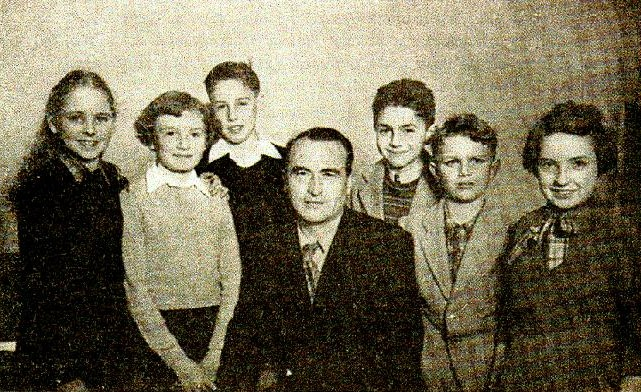
The first French delegation to the first CISV Village in the United States, 1951

== See also ==
- Outward Bound
