= Old Town, Maine =

City in Maine, United States

- City
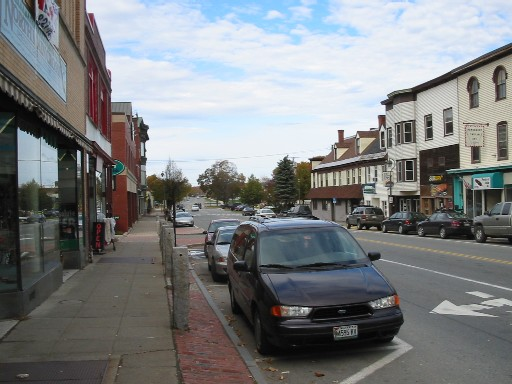
- Main Street

- Flag Seal

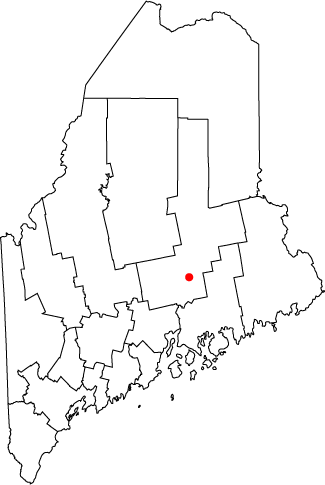
- Location in the state of Maine
- Coordinates: 44°56′58″N 68°42′35″W
- Country: United States
- State: Maine
- County: Penobscot
- Settled: 1774
- Incorporated (town): March 16, 1840
- Incorporated (city): March 30, 1891

Area
  - Total: 43.24 sq mi (111.98 km^{2})
  - Land: 38.81 sq mi (100.52 km^{2})
  - Water: 4.42 sq mi (11.46 km^{2})
- Elevation: 135 ft (41 m)

Population (2020)
  - Total: 7,431
  - Density: 191.5/sq mi (73.93/km^{2})
- Time zone: UTC−5 (Eastern (EST))
  - Summer (DST): UTC−4 (EDT)
- ZIP Codes: 04468 (Old Town); 04489 (Stillwater)
- Area code: 207
- FIPS code: 23-55225
- GNIS feature ID: 582648
- Website: www.old-town.org

Old Town is a city in Penobscot County, Maine, United States. The population was 7,431 at the 2020 census. The city's developed area is chiefly located on the relatively large Marsh Island, but its boundaries extend beyond it. The island is surrounded and defined by the Penobscot River to the east and the Stillwater River to the west.

== History ==
The Abenaki people called it Pannawambskek, meaning "where the ledges spread out," referring to rapids and drops in the river bed. The French established a Jesuit Catholic mission here in the 1680s and called the settlement, Panaouamské. Nearly a century later after Great Britain took over French territory following its victory in the Seven Years' War, the area was settled by English pioneers in 1774. The name Old Town derives from "Indian Old Town", which was the English name for the largest Penobscot Indian village, now known as Indian Island.

Located within the city limits but on its own island in the Penobscot River, the reservation is the current and historical home of the Penobscot Nation.

In 1820, when the present city was set off from neighboring Orono (named for a Penobscot sachem), it was given the name Old Town because it contained the Penobscot village. Over time, the Penobscot village ceased to be called Old Town, and the name migrated to the much newer American settlement across the river.

Old Town may be best known for Old Town Canoe Co., a major manufacturer of canoes and kayaks, which has been based in the city for more than 100 years. The city's location along a series of rapids in the Penobscot River, near the head of tide just downstream in Bangor, made it an ideal location in the 1800s to marshal the water power for mills to process lumber from the millions of board feet of spruce and pine logs floated annually down the Penobscot.

Today many residents work for the University of Maine in Orono and the Eastern Maine Medical Center in Bangor, the two largest employers in the area. Old Town is home to the Nine Dragons Paper Holdings Limited-owned Old Town paper mill.

The city of Old Town includes Treat-Webster Island (a.k.a. "French Island"), a predominantly residential neighborhood located on a small island in the middle of the Penobscot River. French Island is the intermediate land mass between Milford and Old Town; it is connected on either side by a bridge.

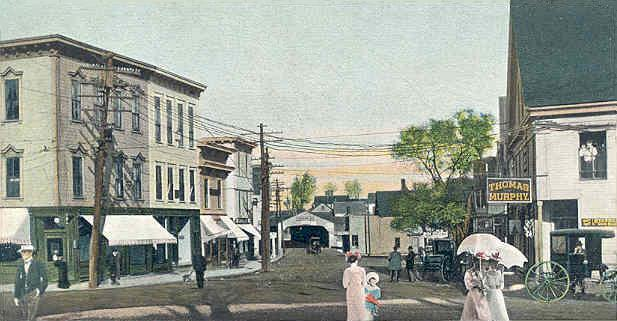
Old toll bridge in 1907

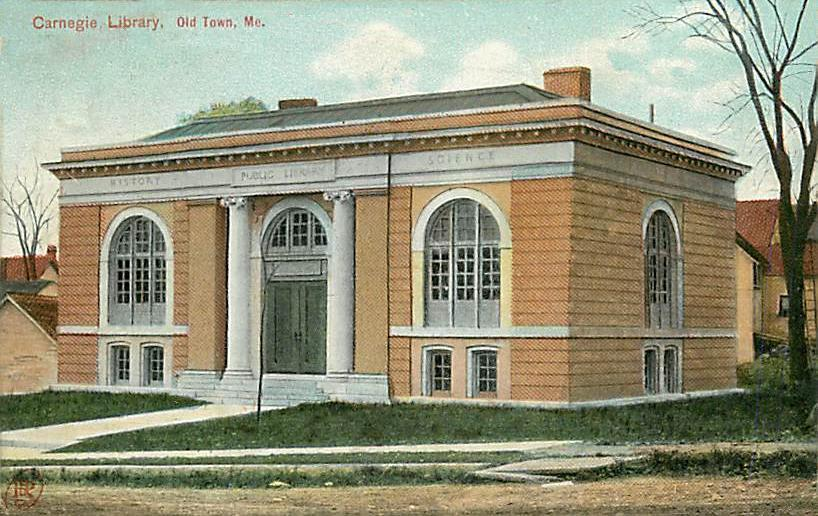
Public Library in 1909

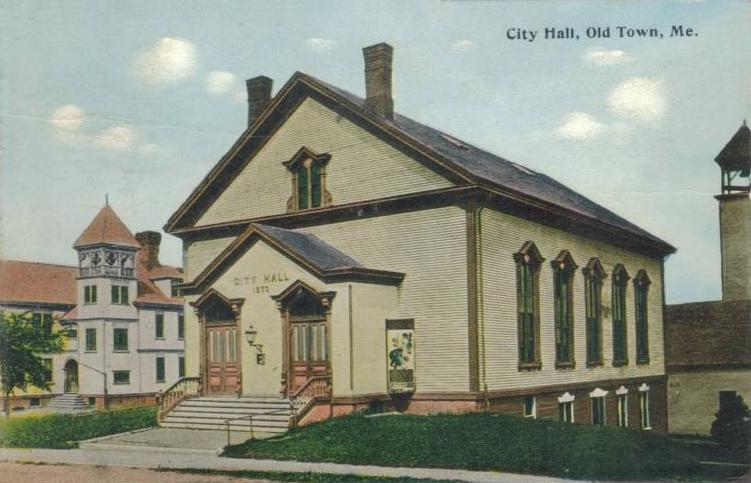
City Hall in 1914

== Geography ==
According to the United States Census Bureau, the city has a total area of 43.28 square miles (112.09 km^{2}), of which 38.85 square miles (100.62 km^{2}) is land and 4.43 square miles (11.47 km^{2}) is water. With its business district located on an island, Old Town is drained by the Stillwater River and Penobscot River.

A small neighborhood north of Stillwater Avenue on the mainland side of the Stillwater River is recognized by the United States Postal Service as "Stillwater," and has its own post office and ZIP code. The Census Bureau does not recognize Stillwater and counts that area as part of Old Town.

The city is crossed by Interstate 95, U. S. Route 2 and 2A, and state routes 16, 43 and 116. It borders the towns of Orono to the south, Glenburn to the west, Hudson to the northwest, Alton and Argyle Township to the north, and (separated by water) is near Milford east, and Bradley to the southeast.

=== Climate ===
This climatic region is typified by large seasonal temperature differences, with warm to hot (and often humid) summers and cold (sometimes severely cold) winters. According to the Köppen Climate Classification system, Old Town has a humid continental climate, abbreviated "Dfb" on climate maps. The climate is similar to that of neighboring Orono.

Climate data for Orono (University of Maine), elevation: 47 m or 154 ft, 1981–2010 normals, extremes and average extremes 1893–2005 (Note: The 30-year period (normal) is for WRCC data only.)
Month	Jan	Feb	Mar	Apr	May	Jun	Jul	Aug	Sep	Oct	Nov	Dec	Year
Record high °F (°C)	65 (18)	63 (17)	83 (28)	89 (32)	99 (37)	100 (38)	102 (39)	104 (40)	97 (36)	90 (32)	78 (26)	64 (18)	104 (40)
Mean maximum °F (°C)	46.2 (7.9)	46.7 (8.2)	58.2 (14.6)	72.2 (22.3)	83.8 (28.8)	89.5 (31.9)	92.0 (33.3)	90.1 (32.3)	84.3 (29.1)	73.7 (23.2)	60.8 (16.0)	49.5 (9.7)	92.0 (33.3)
Mean daily maximum °F (°C)	28.7 (−1.8)	33.6 (0.9)	41.5 (5.3)	54.5 (12.5)	67.3 (19.6)	76.0 (24.4)	81.0 (27.2)	79.6 (26.4)	70.3 (21.3)	56.9 (13.8)	44.8 (7.1)	33.5 (0.8)	55.6 (13.1)
Daily mean °F (°C)	19.9 (−6.7)	24.2 (−4.3)	32.4 (0.2)	44.5 (6.9)	55.9 (13.3)	64.5 (18.1)	70.0 (21.1)	68.8 (20.4)	59.8 (15.4)	48.0 (8.9)	38.1 (3.4)	26.4 (−3.1)	46.0 (7.8)
Mean daily minimum °F (°C)	11.1 (−11.6)	14.8 (−9.6)	23.3 (−4.8)	34.5 (1.4)	44.4 (6.9)	53.0 (11.7)	59.0 (15.0)	57.9 (14.4)	49.3 (9.6)	39.2 (4.0)	31.4 (−0.3)	19.4 (−7.0)	36.4 (2.5)
Mean minimum °F (°C)	−14.8 (−26.0)	−12.9 (−24.9)	−1.18 (−18.43)	19.1 (−7.2)	29.1 (−1.6)	37.7 (3.2)	45.4 (7.4)	41.3 (5.2)	31.0 (−0.6)	23.0 (−5.0)	10.9 (−11.7)	−8 (−22)	−14.8 (−26.0)
Record low °F (°C)	−40 (−40)	−32 (−36)	−25 (−32)	3 (−16)	19 (−7)	29 (−2)	34 (1)	30 (−1)	22 (−6)	13 (−11)	−8 (−22)	−31 (−35)	−40 (−40)
Average precipitation inches (mm)	2.98 (76)	2.48 (63)	3.15 (80)	3.13 (80)	3.41 (87)	3.52 (89)	3.01 (76)	3.27 (83)	3.56 (90)	3.64 (92)	4.03 (102)	4.21 (107)	40.39 (1,025)
Average snowfall inches (cm)	18.7 (47.5)	17.8 (45.2)	11.3 (28.7)	3.9 (9.9)	0.2 (0.5)	0.0 (0.0)	0.0 (0.0)	0.0 (0.0)	0.0 (0.0)	0.4 (1)	4.6 (11.7)	14.9 (37.8)	71.8 (182.3)
Average precipitation days	10	8	9	9	10	10	9	9	9	9	10	9	111
Average snowy days	6.3	4.5	4.3	1.2	trace	0.0	0.0	0.0	0.0	0.1	1.4	4.6	22.4
Average relative humidity (%)	70	68	65	61	65	70	71	71	74	72	72	75	70
Mean daily sunshine hours	6.2	4.1	5.5	5.4	6.5	5.9	7.5	9.4	9.8	9.0	6.5	6.9	6.9
Source: WRCC, Weatherbase (snowfall, precipitation and snow days), Meteoblue (sun days) and timeanddate.com (humidity)

== Demographics ==
Historical population
Census	Pop.	Note	%±
1840	2,342		—
1850	3,087		31.8%
1860	3,860		25.0%
1870	4,529		17.3%
1880	3,395		−25.0%
1890	5,312		56.5%
1900	5,763		8.5%
1910	6,317		9.6%
1920	6,956		10.1%
1930	7,266		4.5%
1940	7,688		5.8%
1950	8,261		7.5%
1960	8,626		4.4%
1970	9,057		5.0%
1980	8,422		−7.0%
1990	8,317		−1.2%
2000	8,130		−2.2%
2010	7,840		−3.6%
2020	7,431		−5.2%
U.S. Decennial Census

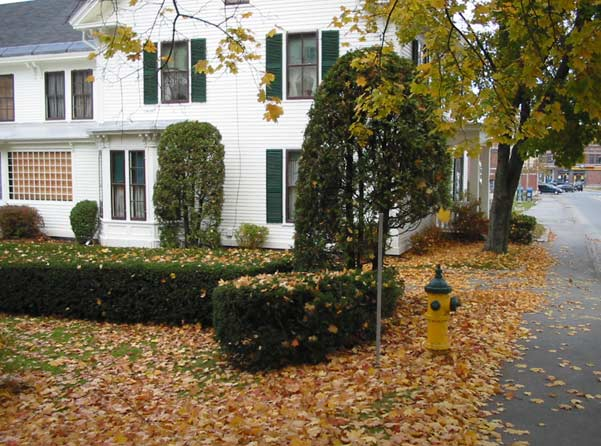
Center Street

=== 2020 census ===
As of the 2020 census, Old Town had a population of 7,431. The median age was 35.4 years. 18.5% of residents were under the age of 18 and 17.3% of residents were 65 years of age or older. For every 100 females there were 99.5 males, and for every 100 females age 18 and over there were 96.6 males age 18 and over.

78.4% of residents lived in urban areas, while 21.6% lived in rural areas.

There were 3,327 households in Old Town, of which 24.1% had children under the age of 18 living in them. Of all households, 36.9% were married-couple households, 21.9% were households with a male householder and no spouse or partner present, and 30.2% were households with a female householder and no spouse or partner present. About 32.8% of all households were made up of individuals and 13.1% had someone living alone who was 65 years of age or older.

There were 3,745 housing units, of which 11.2% were vacant. The homeowner vacancy rate was 2.3% and the rental vacancy rate was 10.0%.

Racial composition as of the 2020 census
Race	Number	Percent
White	6,677	89.9%
Black or African American	99	1.3%
American Indian and Alaska Native	120	1.6%
Asian	121	1.6%
Native Hawaiian and Other Pacific Islander	0	0.0%
Some other race	36	0.5%
Two or more races	378	5.1%
Hispanic or Latino (of any race)	149	2.0%

=== 2010 census ===
As of the census of 2010, there were 7,840 people, 3,382 households, and 1,884 families living in the city. The population density was 201.8 inhabitants per square mile (77.9/km^{2}). There were 3,665 housing units at an average density of 94.3 per square mile (36.4/km^{2}). The racial makeup of the city was 93.1% White, 0.9% African American, 1.6% Native American, 1.8% Asian, 0.1% Pacific Islander, 0.3% from other races, and 2.2% from two or more races. Hispanic or Latino of any race were 1.3% of the population.

There were 3,382 households, of which 24.8% had children under the age of 18 living with them, 40.7% were married couples living together, 11.7% had a female householder with no husband present, 3.4% had a male householder with no wife present, and 44.3% were non-families. 27.0% of all households were made up of individuals, and 10.7% had someone living alone who was 65 years of age or older. The average household size was 2.31 and the average family size was 2.76.

The median age in the city was 33 years. 17.9% of residents were under the age of 18; 20.4% were between the ages of 18 and 24; 24.3% were from 25 to 44; 23.6% were from 45 to 64; and 13.8% were 65 years of age or older. The gender makeup of the city was 48.3% male and 51.7% female.

=== 2000 census ===
As of the census of 2000, there were 8,130 people, 3,426 households, and 1,993 families living in the city. The population density was 212.3 inhabitants per square mile (82.0/km^{2}). There were 3,686 housing units at an average density of 96.3 per square mile (37.2/km^{2}). The racial makeup of the city was 94.62% White, 0.65% African American, 1.48% Native American, 1.83% Asian, 0.04% Pacific Islander, 0.28% from other races, and 1.09% from two or more races. Hispanic or Latino of any race were 0.52% of the population.

There were 3,426 households, out of which 26.1% had children under the age of 18 living with them, 44.7% were married couples living together, 10.1% had a female householder with no husband present, and 41.8% were non-families. 29.1% of all households were made up of individuals, and 11.7% had someone living alone who was 65 years of age or older. The average household size was 2.30 and the average family size was 2.83.

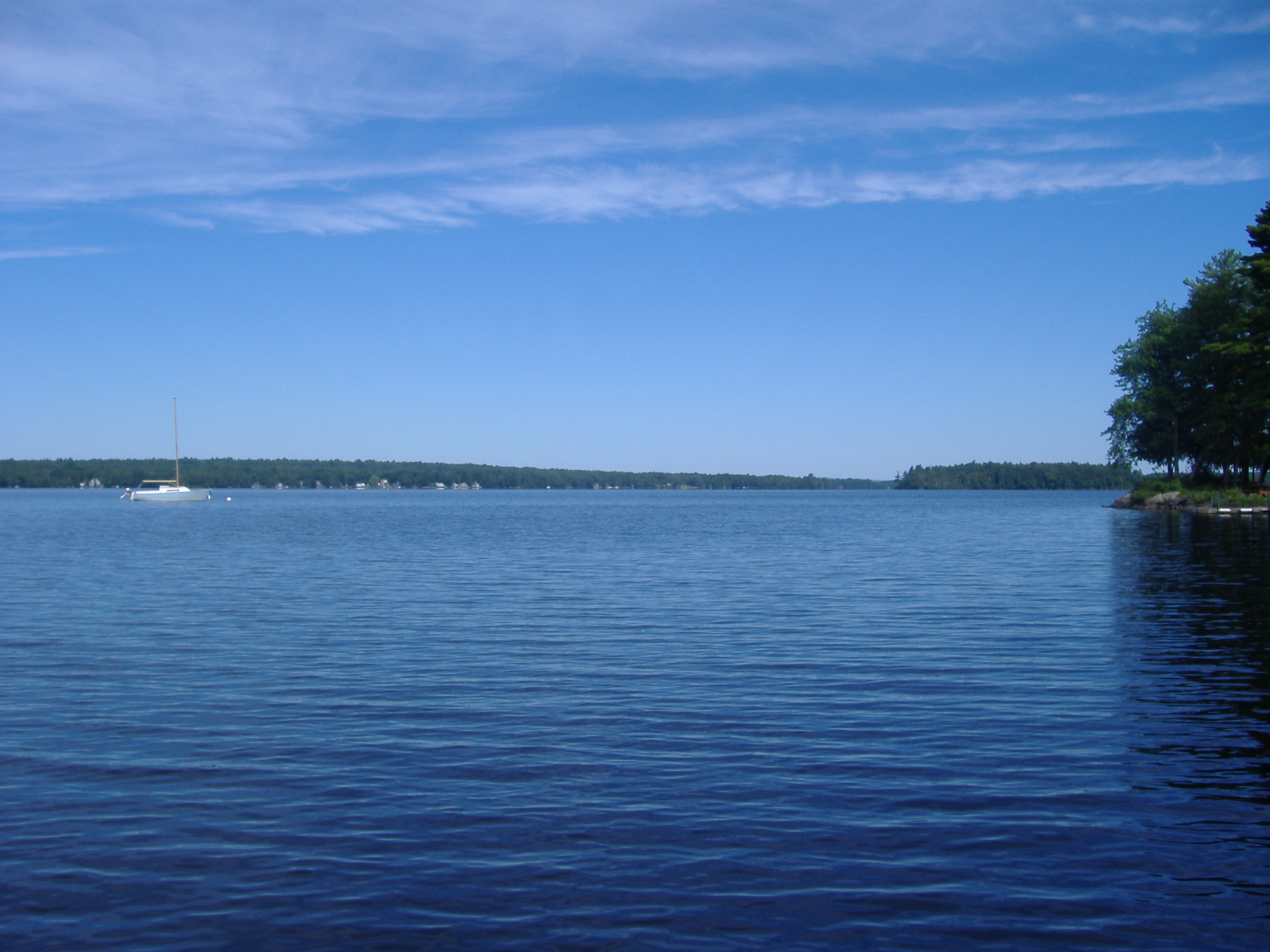
Pushaw Lake

In the city, the population was spread out, with 20.0% under the age of 18; 18.3% from 18 to 24; 27.0% from 25 to 44; 20.8% from 45 to 64; and 13.9% who were 65 years of age or older. The median age was 34 years. For every 100 females, there were 91.2 males. For every 100 females age 18 and over, there were 90.8 males.

The median income for a household in the city was $29,886, and the median income for a family was $40,589. Males had a median income of $32,961 versus $23,723 for females. The per capita income for the city was $16,100. About 11.8% of families and 18.6% of the population were below the poverty line, including 14.6% of those under age 18 and 14.6% of those age 65 or over.

== Education ==
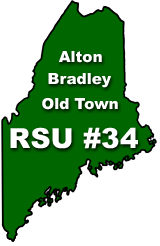
Logo for RSU #34

Old Town is part of Regional School Unit (RSU) #34, which includes the towns of Alton, Bradley, and Old Town. The RSU is composed of five schools: Alton Elementary School, Viola Rand Elementary School, Old Town Elementary School, Leonard Middle School, and Old Town High School. In 2006–2007 the school changed its mascot from the Old Town Indians to the Old Town Coyotes. A new community project to renovate the high school track and bolster the school's athletic facilities broke ground in 2013. Old Town's school colors are green and white.

- RSU #34: Alton, Bradley, and Old Town
- Stillwater Montessori School

== Government ==
Old Town uses a city council with seven elected councilors, including a Council President. As of March 2020, the current mayor of Old Town is David Mahan.

== Historic buildings ==
Listed in the National Register of Historic Places:

- St. Anne's Church and Mission Site, located on Indian Island
- St. James Episcopal Church, designed by Boston-based English architect Henry Vaughan
- Edith Marion Patch House (known as Braeside)

== Sites of interest ==
- Old Town Museum
- Sewall Park on Perch Pond (formerly known as Mud Pond)

== Notable people ==
- Doris Twitchell Allen, psychologist, founder of the Children's International Summer Villages
- Samuel Cony, 31st governor of Maine
- James Dill, state legislator
- Matthew Dunlap, Maine State Auditor and 47th Secretary of State of Maine
- Patty Griffin, singer-songwriter
- Chad Hayes, University of Maine and NFL football player
- Charles Davis Jameson, Civil War general
- Molly Spotted Elk, actress and dancer
- Tabitha King, author, wife of author Stephen King
- Bud Leavitt Jr., longtime editor and columnist, The Bangor Daily News, television host
- Dick MacPherson, head coach of the New England Patriots
- William F. Milliken Jr., engineer and racing driver
- Nick Noonan, founding member of Karmin
- David Richard Porter, YMCA youth leader and Maine's first Rhodes Scholar
- Charles W. Roberts, Civil War general
- Aaron Y. Ross, 'Old West' character
- Theresa Secord, founder of Maine Indian Basketmakers Alliance
- George P. Sewall, speaker of the Maine House of Representatives
- Joseph Sewall, president of the Maine Senate
- Andrew Sockalexis, Olympic athlete
- Louis "Chief" Sockalexis, first Native American major league baseball player
- Mary Ellen St. John, Miss Maine 1954
- Gary Thorne, Broadcaster
- Walter E. Webber, lawyer and Mason
- George F. Wilson, catcher with the Detroit Tigers and Boston Red Sox
