= David Moses Bridges =

Passamaquoddy artist and environmentalist

David Moses Bridges (May 17, 1962 – January 20, 2017) was a Native American artist and environmentalist known for his traditional birchbark canoes and baskets. He was a member of the Passamaquoddy tribal community on the Passamaquoddy Pleasant Point Reservation. Bridges fought for tribal environmental rights and co-founded Mulankeyutmonen Nkihtakmikon (We Take Care of the Homeland), to preserve the Wabanaki culture.

He learned how to build traditional Wabanaki Birchbark canoes from his studies, which included the teaching of his great-grandfather Sylvester Gabriel, and courses at the Woodenboat School with his dear friend and mentor Steve Cayard.

== Biography and education ==
Bridges was born in Portland, Maine, on May 17, 1962, and predominantly grew up in South Portland. During the summertime, he spent his time with in the native community at Sebayik.

After graduating high school in 1980, Bridges moved to San Francisco, California, where he lived for the next ten years. While living in San Francisco, he worked several jobs that included painting, carpentry, and group home counseling. In 1994, Bridges and his partner Jessica Francis moved to Sebayik. They would go on to have his first son: Tobias. Later in life Bridges married his wife Patricia Ayala Rocabado and went on to have two more boys: Sabattus, and Natanis. When his first son was four, Bridges began studying history at the University of Maine at Machias, after which point he moved to Bethel, Maine. He held birch canoe workshops and together with his wife, held presentations at several anthropological, and archaeological conferences in North and South America. He also held presentations at universities and cultural institutions.

When Bridges was 54, he was diagnosed with sinus cancer, which led to his death on January 20, 2017. His eldest son Tobias has continued his work by joining the canoe project led by Cayard and Patricia, further pursuing her parents' careers in indigenous archaeology. Patricia also began working on an art book and a film on Bridges.

== Early life ==
David Moses Bridges was born on May 17, 1962. He mainly spent the majority of his childhood in the South of Portland, Maine. Bridges grew up with his father Earl Bridges, mother Hilda Soctomah, his great-grandfather, Sylvester Gabriel, brother Darel Bridges and his sister Jennifer Bridges. Bridges' great-grandfather lived with them as a care-taker for him and his siblings.

His great-grandfather introduced him to the traditional Wabanaki birchbark craft but due to his great-grandfather's old age, they were not able to create a birchbark canoe together. Bridges' great-grandfather died in 1971 when he was 9 years old but he left the family with the tools he used such as a traditional Wabanaki "crooked knife", draw knife, and an awl.

== Artworks ==
=== Traditional birchbark canoe ===
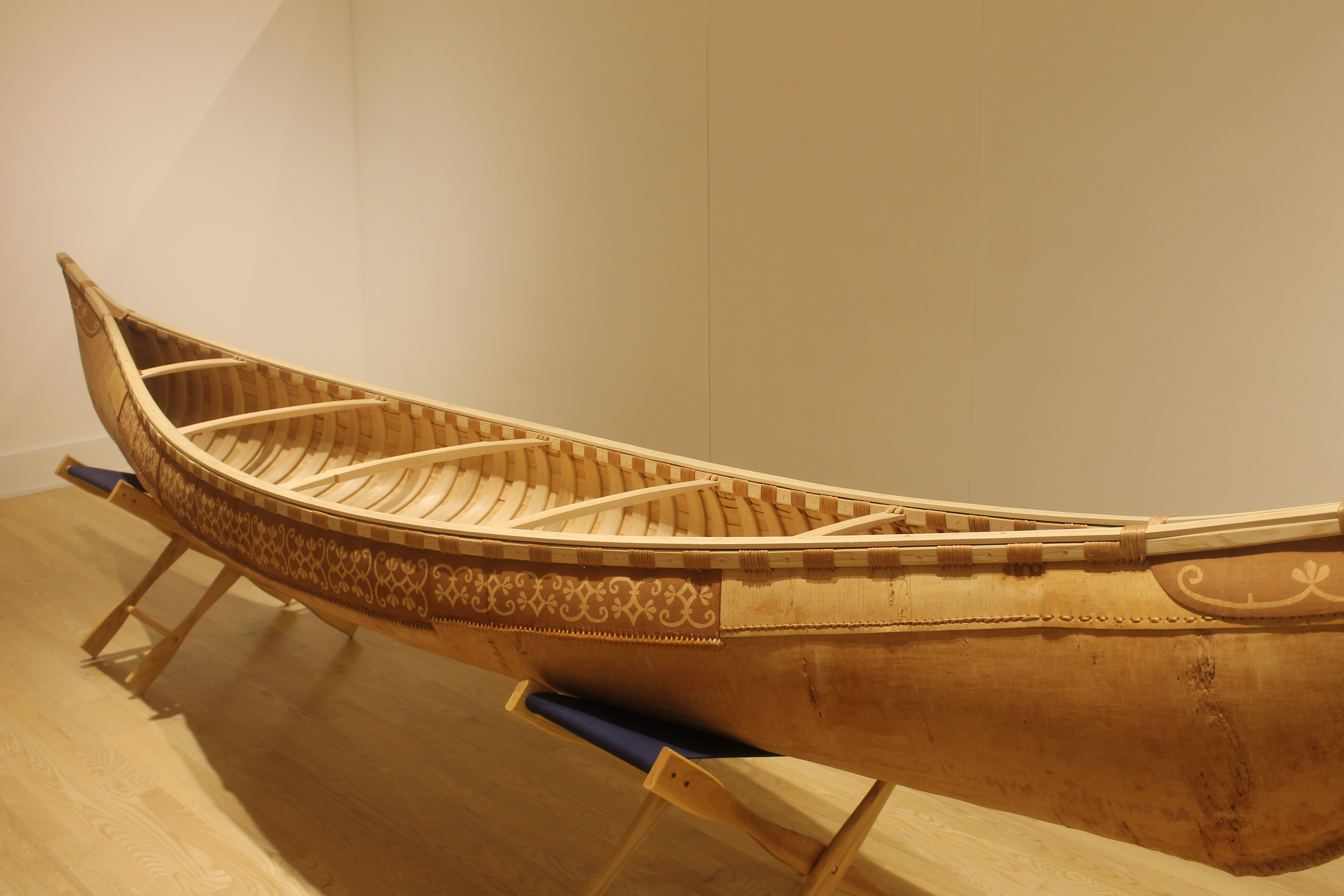
Traditional Birchbark Canoe. This canoe is at the Abbe Museum, Bar Harbor. David Moses Bridges brought back the traditional birchbark canoe to show people that their Reservation did not disappear.

Bridge's ancestors started off making the traditional birchbark canoe until his great father's time. His grandfather gave him the tools and the materials to create a canoe. Bridges was inspired to build the birchbark canoes because he believed that it would help keep the tradition alive in the modern-day and wanted people to thank their ancestors for creating this masterpiece. The traditional birchbark canoe had to be thin so that it was easy to carry after using it. The material needed to create the birchbark canoe was red cedar for thwarts and planking, birchbark and spruce roots. Plus a bear fat and spruce sap mix for waterproofing patches. According to Bridges, no special tools were needed except a crooked knife made out of beaver tooth.

=== Birchbark box ===
The birchbark box was made out of birch bark and spruce root. Bridges died before he could complete the box. He did not intend to fully decorate the birchbark box, as he wanted people to see and appreciate the beauty of the bark itself.

=== "Story Basket" ===
Bridges made this basket while experiencing family difficulties and reflects his internal struggles to provide for his family. It features several scenes, one of which is of his pregnant wife and child Sabattus asking for food. Another features Bridges hunting for moose and carrying a canoe, as well as Tobias alone pulling a sled. Behind all of these scenes, an ancestor is shown watching over the family.

=== Knife sheath ===
Bridges created this knife sheath while working on other artwork. He would often carry his knife around and as he did not want to cut himself on the sharp edge, he created a sheath using birch bark and spruce roots, materials with which he was already working.

== Exhibition ==
Abbe Museum located in Bar Harbor, Maine

Peabody Essex Museum located in Salem, Massachusetts. September 27, 2014 ~ September 20, 2015

Heard Museum Guild Indian Fair and Market, 2015

Solo Exhibitions:

Only Connect: Richard vanBuren & David Moses Bridges, Aucocisco Gallery, Portland, Maine. January 15, 2008 ~ March 1, 2008

Group Exhibitions:

- Wabanaki Antiques Expo, May 9
- Branching Out: Trees as Art, Peabody Essex Museum, Salem, Massachusetts ~2014
- Maine Indian Basketry Exhibition, at Maine Fiberarts. This exhibition included Pam Cunningham, George Neptune, Clara Keezer, Molly Neptune Parker, Jeremy Frey, Fred Tomah, Mart Sanipass, Thersea Secord, and Sarah Sochbeson. May 5 ~June 30, 2015

== Collections ==
- Eitelijorg (Indianapolis, IN)

- Downeast Heritage Museum (Calais, ME)

- Penobscot Marine Museum (Searsport, ME)

- Abbe Museum (Bar Harbor, ME)

- Hudson Museum (Orono, ME)

- Passamaquoddy Cultural Heritage Museum (Indian Township, ME)

- National Museum of the American Indian (New York, NY)

== Awards and honors ==
- Main Arts Commissions gave him the name Traditional Arts Fellow, highest honor in craft
- 1997; Patrick Miranda Foundation
- 1998; Patrick Miranda Foundation
- 2000; Maine Arts Commission, Master/Apprentice Award
- 2004; Maine Boats and Harbors, Boat of the Year Award
- 2005; First Peoples Fund, Community Spirit Award
- 2006; First People's Fund gave him its Community Spirit Award, National Honor in recognition of his work
- 2007; Jennifer Easton Community Spirit Award honoree
- 2007; Fund for Folklife Culture, Professional Development Grant
- 2007; First Peoples Fund, Cultural Capitol Fellow
- 2008; Artists in Business Leadership Fellow, Cultural Capital Fellow
- 2008; Eitelijorg Museum, Artist and Residence Fellowship
- 2008; New England Foundation for the Arts
- 2014; Santa Fe Indian Market, Honorable Mention
- 2015; Heard Museum Indian Fair and Market, Basket Division, First place
- 2017; letter of tribute from members of the Senate and House of Representatives of the State of Maine

== Legacy ==
After Bridges's death, his wife, Patricia Ayala Rocabado, created an artbook of his works. A documentary on his life, Rhythms of the Heart, was created by Thom Willey and released in August 2017. In 2019, authors Donald Soctomah and Jean Flahive released The Canoe Maker: David Moses Bridges, Passamaquoddy Birch Bark Artisan through Custom Museum Publishing LLC.

A scholarship has been named after Bridges, the David Moses Bridges Scholarship, which is granted by the First Peoples Fund. The David Moses Bridges scholarship was provided though the Maine Community Foundation that supports the First People Fund Cultural.
