= Peskotomuhkati Nation =

Non-profit organization in New Brunswick, Canada

Peskotomuhkati Nation at Skutik
- Qonasqamkuk
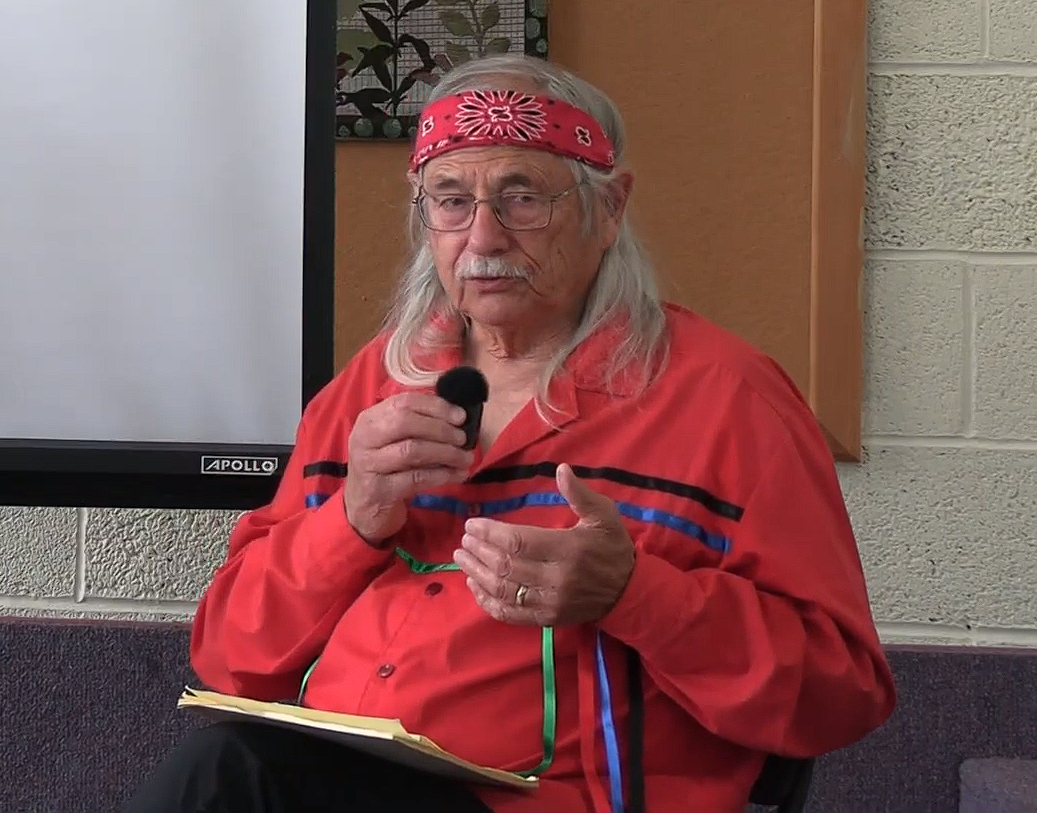
- Hugh Akagi, Chief of the Peskotomuhkati Nation at Skutik

- Location within New Brunswick
- Type: Non-profit organization
- Headquarters: Saint Stephen, New Brunswick
- Coordinates: 45.07399°N 67.05209°W
- Members: ≈ 350
- Official language: English
- Website: qonaskamkuk.com

The Peskotomuhkati Nation at Skutik, also known as the Passamaquoddy at St. Croix and Passamaquoddy Recognition Group, Inc. (PRGI) is a Passamaquoddy First Nation in New Brunswick, Canada.

It does not have official First Nations status in Canada. The Peskotomuhkati Nation at Skutik is based in Saint Andrews 20-40km away from the Sipayik and Passamaquoddy Indian Township Reservation reservations in the United States.

Hugh Akagi is the chief (sakom) of the Peskotomuhkati Nation at Skutik, having held the position since he was first elected in 1998. He is a former scientist of Fisheries and Oceans Canada. His sister, Kate Akagi, was the deputy mayor of Saint Andrews, New Brunswick.

== History and recognition efforts ==
As part of the Wabanaki Confederacy, the Peskotomuhtaki people were signatories of the Peace and Friendship Treaties with the British Crown. The original 1760 treaty was discovered in the Massachusetts Archives in 2024 by the local Saint Andrews Historical Society.

The tribe was not included in the 1951 Indian Act.

In 2004, the French Legion of Honour was presented to the Passamaquoddy tribe by Xavier Darcos, commemorating their historic aid to the 1604-1605 St. Croix Colony founded by Pierre Dugua, Sieur de Mons' 79-man French expedition.

In 2017, the Ministry of Crown-Indigenous Affairs began negotiations with the Peskotomuhkati to define their treaty relationship.

In 2018, the Canadian federal government assisted the Peskotomuhtaki in acquiring 2,500 acres of land along the St. Croix River, which is held in trust by the Nature Trust of New Brunswick.

In 2021, a plaque was installed documenting the history of the Peskotomuhkati Nation in the St. Stephen portion of the Coastal Link Trail.

In 2021 the tribe's naming committee collaborated with Claire Goodwin of the Huntsman Marine Science Centre on the naming of a new sea sponge species discovered off the coast of Deer Island. The second word of the sea sponge's scientific name, Crellomima mehqisinpekonuta, means "something reddish orange and animate that gets water squeezed out of it" in the Maliseet-Passamaquoddy language.

== See also ==
- List of organizations that self-identify as FNIM governments
