= Donald Soctomah =

Passamaquoddy author, filmmaker, historian and politician

Donald Soctomah (born 1955) is a Native American author, filmmaker, historian, and politician. He serves as the tribal historic preservation officer for the Passamaquoddy tribe, where he works with both the U.S. and Canadian governments on the protection of culturally significant sites, artifacts and knowledge. Soctomah has written several books about Passamaquoddy history, as well as a children's book, Remember Me: Tomah Joseph's Gift to Franklin Delano Roosevelt and The Canoe Maker.

Called "the most recognized member of the Passamaquoddy tribe," he appeared on the PBS reality show Colonial House, which premiered in 2004 and was filmed on Passamaquoddy land. Soctomah has also appeared in several films about the history and legends of his tribe, including some made for National Public Television, Maine Public Television, Canadian Broadcasting, Animal Planet and several other networks.

== Education ==
Soctomah received a bachelor's degree in Forest Management from the University of Maine in 1984. He also attended the Professional and Advanced Study of Silviculture at Michigan Tech/Suny College in 1998, and a doctorate in Humanities from the University of Maine at Machias in 2006.

== Political career ==
Serving for 8 years as a Passamaquoddy Tribal Representative in the Maine House of Representatives, where he was successful in passing legislature on the protection of Native American grave sites, the protection of Native American Archaeological sites, the requirement to teach Wabanaki history in all Maine k-12 schools, and the removal of offensive place names from geographical landmarks in Maine. In this capacity, he successfully introduced legislation in 2000 to change offensive names, which included more than 25 places in Maine called "Squaw Mountain."

== Tribal Historic Preservation ==
As Tribal Historic Preservation Officer, Soctomah is a frequent consultant on federal & Maine historic and educational projects, including films, CDs, and books. He has worked on a project to inventory Passamaquoddy place names in Maine, and has been deeply involved in Passamaquoddy language revitalization efforts.

In addition to running the Passamaquoddy tribal museum, Soctomah contributed to the Downeast Heritage Center's second biggest exhibit in Calais, Maine, called "People of the Dawn." Displays include replicas of local petroglyphs, some dating more than 3,000 years, one depicting a 17th-century sailing vessel, probably Champlain's, which must have moored in Machias Bay within view of the artist. Soctomah contributed to the exhibit with an exhibit of a centuries-old wampum belt.

On March 30, 2015, the Maine Humanities Council awarded Soctomah its highest honor, the Constance H. Carlson Prize, for his exemplary contributions to public humanities in Maine.

In Washington DC at the International Conference of Indigenous Archives, Libraries, and Museums, he was awarded the International 2015 Guardian of Culture and Lifeways Award.

Lifetime Achievement Award - Honors Donald's whose work has significantly contributed to the preservation and understanding of indigenous cultural heritage.

== Publications ==
- Hard Times at Passamaquoddy, 1921-1950 (2003)
- Let Me Live as My Ancestors Had, 1850-1890: Tribal Life and Times in Maine and New Brunswick (2005)
- Passamaquoddy at the Turn of the Century, 1890-1920 (2002)
- Save the Land for the Children, 1800-1850: Passamaquoddy Tribal Life and Times in Maine and New Brunswick (2009)
- Tihtiyas and Jean (Bouton D’or Acadie, 2007)
- Remember Me: Tomah Joseph's Gift to Franklin Delano Roosevelt (Tilbury House Publishers, 2015)
- The Canoe Maker (Maine Authors Publishing, 2019)
