= Tomah Joseph =

19th-century Passamaquoddy leader and artist

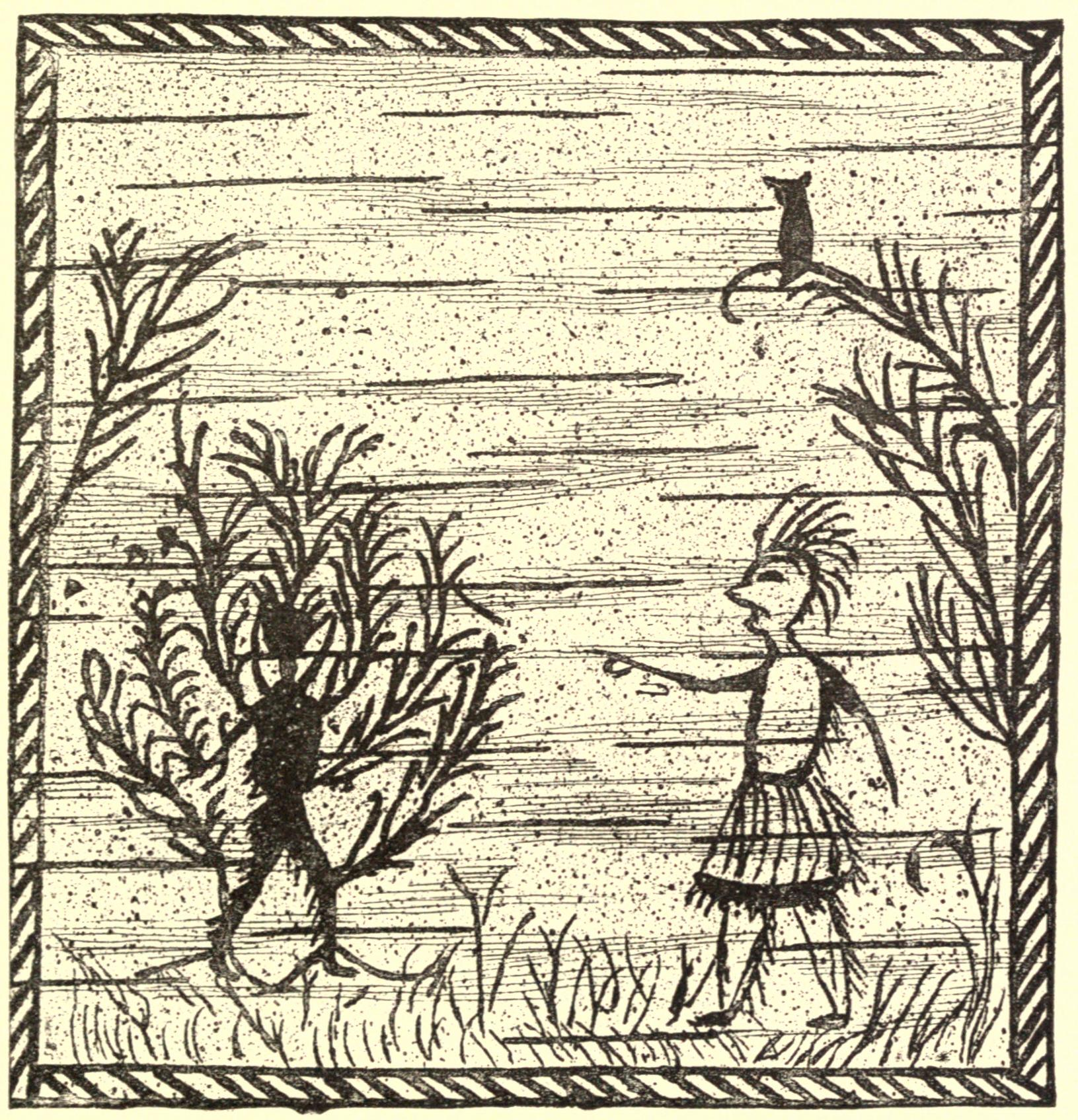
- A circa 1884 illustration on birch bark by Tomah Joseph of the hero Glooscap transforming a man, who wished to live forever, into a cedar tree
- Born: c. 1837
- Died: 1914 (aged 76–77)
- Other names: Joseph Tomah, Tomah Josephs
- Elected: governor of the Passamaquoddy Tribe
- Patrons: Franklin D. Roosevelt

Tomah Joseph (c. 1837–1914), a.k.a. Joseph Tomah and Tomah Josephs, was a Passamaquoddy artist and governor of communities in Maine in the United States. He taught the future US president Franklin Delano Roosevelt how to canoe.

== Early life ==
Tomah Joseph was born in 1837 in the Passamaquoddy Indian Township Reservation in eastern Maine. He married Hanna Lewey. The couple had a son Sabattis in 1871.

He worked as guide during the summers around Campobello Island in southwestern New Brunswick. Joseph and his family would make an annual trip from the St. Croix River to the Passamaquoddy Bay to work seasonally, collecting materials for their basket weaving. In the summers, he began to take visitors out in his canoe for tours and fishing. During his time as a guide, he mentored a young Franklin Roosevelt while teaching him how to navigate the ocean surrounding Campobello Island. Along with canoeing, he was a fly fishing and hunting guide. During his time as a fly fishing guide in the late 1800s, he was given credit for the Tomah Jo wet fly attractor pattern.

== Political career ==
Joseph was elected governor of the Passamaquoddy Tribe around 1882.

== Artwork ==
Tomah Joseph made both practical household items and more decorative items out of birchbark, that he covered in Passamaquoddy carvings and then sold to tourists. This was done both for economic gain and to preserve the heritage of the Passamaquoddy tribe. Tomah Joseph's birchbark artwork differed from past native pieces as he developed his own illustrative style along with new forms that fit modern Victorian usage, such as yarn holders and waste baskets, which were previously not seen in birchbark craft.

Canoe Backrest were made both for their comfortable practicality while touring and then sold after a souvenirs. The backrest had a front and back panel with an ash tree seam connecting the two sides. It would normally be filled with wood shavings to hold its shape. Often these backrest were decorated with illustrations of the Native American legend behind Friar's Rock. They were made and sold from 1890 - 1900.

Lidded Box, in the Metropolitan Museum, is a 10.2 x 7 cm birchbark container made in 1890. It has carvings of birds on its lid, human figures on three of its four sides, and the words "KOLELEMOOKE MIKWID'HAMIN" on the fourth.

Tomah Joseph Basket was made in 1906. His signature story illustrations are carved on the outside of it. The imagery includes a bear, man, and canoe amongst other figures.

== New style ==
Tomah Joseph adapted the traditional birch bark craft that was passed down through the Passamaquoddy tribe to meet the consumer ideals of non-native visitors purchasing his work. Originally Passamaquoddy artist would carve floral or geometric patterns, or use illustrations to tell stories on their artworks. Tomah Joseph was the first to combined all these styles into a singular piece creating this new style of Passamaquoddy carvings. As others started to copy and learn from his style, this new group of artists became known as the "School of Tomah Joseph."

The geometric and floral patterns would be incorporated as a frame around the characters that Joseph carved. The human figures also tended to be more realistic than the traditional picture writing used in previous Passamaquoddy artists carvings.

== Collections ==
Joseph was an accomplished birchbark canoe-maker, who notably made a canoe for the young Franklin D. Roosevelt that is now in the collection of the Roosevelt Campobello International Park. Many of Joseph's works were birchbark manuscripts. His work is included in the collections of the Metropolitan Museum of Art, the Abbe Museum, and the National Museum of the American Indian, Smithsonian Institution.

== Exhibitions ==
The Haffenreffer Museum of Anthropology at Brown University hosted an exhibition, History on Birchbark: The Art of Tomah Joseph, Passamaquoddy in 1993. Curated by Joan lester, the exhibition included information on the history of birchbark art, historical background on the Passamaquoddy tribe, a biography of Tomah Joseph's life including his relationships with Franklin Roosevelt and Charles Leland, the new style of birchbark work that Tomah Joseph created, the origin stories from Native American folklore that was used in his illustrations, as well as explanations for some specific carvings and what their significance was. The exhibition physically included archival photographs of Tomah Joseph's life, 42 various pieces he created, as well as some artworks created by his descendants.
