= Francis Joseph Neptune =

Passamaquoddy chief

Concouguash, Christian name Francis Joseph Neptune, (1735–1834) was chief of the Passamaquoddy tribe during the American Revolutionary War. He succeeded his father, Bahgulwet (aka Jean-Baptiste Neptune), who died in 1778, and was succeeded by his own son, John Francis Neptune, in 1824. The term "chief" later became the word for governor. Becoming chief is passed along through family lineage and requires acceptance from the Passamaquoddies, Penobscots and Maliseet tribes. These three tribes share similar chief induction ceremonies, conducted simultaneously with eyewitnesses from each tribe present.

== 1770s ==
During the Revolution, the Passamaquoddies sided with the American colonists to fight against the British soldiers invading the eastern coast of Maine. On June 12, 1775 the tribe assisted the American military in a naval attack at Pleasant Point known as the "Battle of the Rim", or Battle of Machias in Machias, Maine. After gaining permission from the commanding officer, Chief Francis Neptune was the one who fired the first shot, with his flintlock rifle, at the Battle of the Rim. Roughly 200 Passamaquoddies were soldiers in the Revolutionary War serving under Chief Francis Neptune's orders. George Washington proclaimed a "pledge of friendship" after the success of the Passamaquoddy people's efforts in battle. On Christmas Eve of 1776 George Washington wrote to the tribe in hopes that they would come to the aid of the colonies by sending warriors and ensuring Passamaquoddy boundaries along the Canada and Maine border. According to Colonel John Allan, the man whom the Passamaquoddies served under, noted in his journal that Chief Joseph Francis earned £4 for his participation in the Battle of Machias.

== 1790s ==
In the 1790s the Passamaquoddies were in land and rights disputes with the government. Chief Francis Neptune took responsibility and fought for his people. He did this by reminding the white government of the help that the Passamaquoddies contributed to the American Colonists winning the Revolutionary War. There is a statement from Colonel Allan saying that the Native Americans who served time for the United States military will be viewed as brothers, children, and under protection and care of the United States. Colonel Allan was also reported saying that their future children should enjoy all the rights and privileges that all Americans will receive.

Chief Neptune was part of the negotiation with the Commonwealth of Massachusetts to separate a piece of land from the state for the Passamaquoddies. In 1794 the Passamaquoddy reservation, Passamaquoddy Pleasant Point Reservation, was established by the state. The reservation was originally 23,000 acres with additional acreage at other points in Maine for hunting and fishing. He lived on the reservation with his wife, Sabattis Neptune, until he died in 1834. After the establishment of the reservation, Chief Neptune spoke in front of the Massachusetts government in Boston, Massachusetts saying that Passamaquoddies should be allowed to make decisions regarding their established land

Also in 1796 Chief Francis Neptune served as a guide along the United States and Canada border. On that surveying trip he signed a land treaty to establish boundaries between the Passamaquoddy reservation, the United States, and Canada. To help draw land boundaries and features Chief Francis Neptune drew a map of the Cobscook River area on July 12, 1798. This map helped British Commissioner Thomas Barclay learn about the St. Croix River and land boundaries

== 1800s ==
In 1829 Andrew Jackson met with Chief Neptune. The president enjoyed his meeting with the Passamaquoddy tribe and extended his gratitude in the same way that George Washington had done, the "chains of friendship" continued to be strong with the tribe

In 1834 Chief Francis Joseph Neptune died on his Passamaquoddy Pleasant Point Reservation at the age of 99. In his honor a schooner was built for him at Huston's Shipyard. Many people spoke highly of him because they approved of the actions he did while he was chief.

== Works ==
- Francis Joseph Neptune (2014). "1813 Speech". In Siobhan Senier (ed.). Dawnland Voices: An Anthology of Indigenous Writing from New England. Lincoln: University of Nebraska Press. pp. 164–165.
