= Abbe Museum =

- U.S. National Register of Historic Places
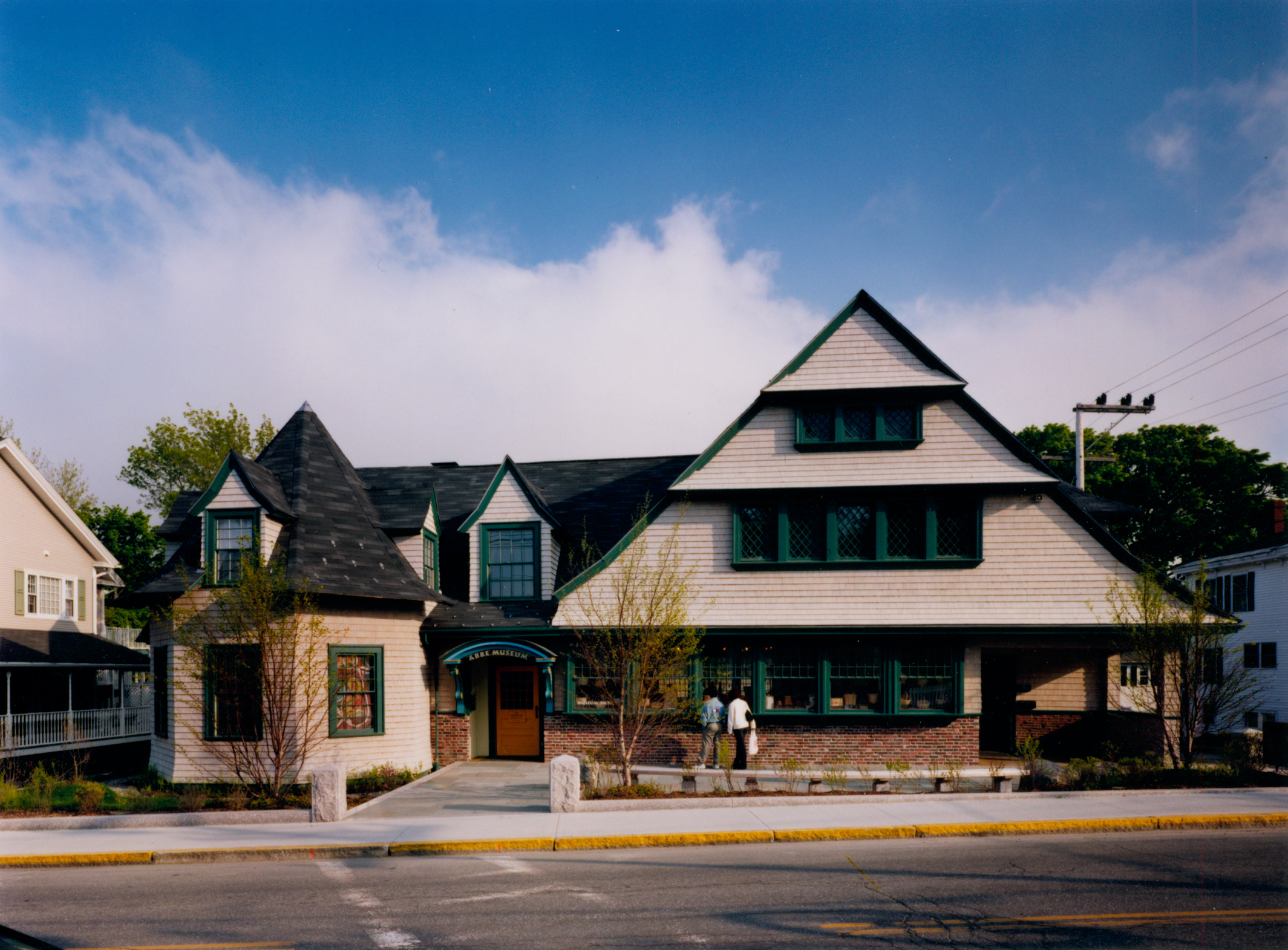

- Location within Maine Location within the United States
- Nearest city: Bar Harbor, Maine
- Coordinates: 44.387197°N 68.205679°W
- Area: 0.5 acres (0.20 ha)
- Built: 1928 (98 years ago)
- Architect: Gilchrist, Edmund B.; Shea Brothers
- NRHP reference No.: 83000451
- Added to NRHP: January 19, 1983

The Abbe Museum is a cultural institution with two locations in Bar Harbor, Maine, on Mount Desert Island. It is dedicated to illuminating and advancing greater understanding of Wabanaki Nations' heritage, living cultures, and homelands. The museum is led by a Wabanaki-majority Board of Trustees and works in consultation with representatives of the Tribal Nations of the Wabanaki Confederacy (including, Maliseet, Mi'kmaq, Passamaquoddy, and Penobscot peoples) - centering their voices in exhibitions and programming.

The museum maintains two locations: a downtown location at 26 Mount Desert Street in the center of Bar Harbor, and a historic trailside location at Sieur de Monts Spring in Acadia National Park. The Sieur de Monts building is listed on the National Register of Historic Places as one of Maine's first purpose-built museum buildings and a rare example of Mediterranean-inspired architecture in the state. It is one of the only two remaining privately-operated trailside museums within the National Park system.

== Mission and values ==
The museum's mission is "to illuminate and advance greater understanding of and support for Wabanaki Nations' heritage, living cultures, and homelands." Its stated vision is that "a profound shift in understanding, respect, and support for sovereign Wabanaki Nations leads us all into a more thriving and equitable future."

The museum's four core values are Community, Respect, Responsibility, and Creativity. A distinctive institutional commitment is the museum's emphasis on living Wabanaki cultures and contemporary expression, explicitly moving away from framing the museum as solely historical.

== History ==
=== Founding and the Sieur de Monts location (1926–1990s) ===
The Abbe Museum was founded in 1926 by Dr. Robert Abbe (1851–1928), a New York physician known for his pioneering use of radiation therapy and a longtime summer resident of Bar Harbor, Maine. During the 1920s, Dr. Abbe assembled a collection of early Native American artifacts found in the Frenchman Bay area and persuaded others with similar collections to establish a museum to protect and display them. Early supporters included George B. Dorr, known as "the father of Acadia", and John D. Rockefeller Jr.

The museum opened on August 14, 1928, as a private trailside museum at Sieur de Monts Spring in Lafayette National Park (later renamed Acadia National Park). It was dedicated to Abbe's memory; he had died in March of that year. The building was designed by Edmund M. Gilchrist and completed in 1928. It features elements of both the Spanish Colonial Revival and the Italian Renaissance styles, with a unique octagonal space specifically designed in consultation with Dr. Abbe to house his collections. It is considered the only non-domestic example of Mediterranean architecture in Maine and its first purpose-built museum building. In 1928, the Abbe became the first institution in Maine to sponsor archaeological field research and has since served as the main repository of archaeological collections from Maine's Midcoast and Downeast regions.

From its initial focus on archaeology, the museum expanded to include ethnographic materials. In 1931, Mary Cabot Wheelwright, founder of the Wheelwright Museum of the American Indian in Santa Fe, New Mexico, donated an important collection of Native American baskets and other objects. The Abbe subsequently became the holder of the largest and best-documented Wabanaki basketry collection in any museum. The museum also developed an extensive contemporary collection documenting the continuing Wabanaki artistic traditions in Maine.

Beginning in the 1980s and 1990s, members of Wabanaki Nations became increasingly involved in programmatic aspects of the museum, including serving as curators of exhibitions.

=== Downtown Bar Harbor location (2001–present) ===
By the 1990s, the 2,000-square-foot Sieur de Monts building had become too small to house the growing collections and could only operate seasonally. In 1997, the Abbe purchased the former YMCA building in downtown Bar Harbor, an 1893 landmark. A $6 million capital campaign funded the renovation and expansion into a 17,000-square-foot museum with exhibition galleries, indoor and outdoor programming spaces, a research laboratory, and a climate-controlled collections storage area.

The downtown location opened on September 29, 2001, with permanent and rotating exhibitions, including the major installment ' 'Wabanaki: People of the Dawn' '. The current core exhibition, ' 'People of the First Light' ', provides visitors with an understanding of Wabanaki history and living cultures.

In 2026, the museum launched a refreshed visual identity reflecting a newly updated mission, vision, and values.

=== Sieur de Monts centennial restoration (planned 2028) ===
The Sieur de Monts location is currently closed for restoration (at publication date of March 17, 2026) and expected to re-open in 2028. In 2024, the museum received $500,000 in congressionally directed spending towards the repair and reopening of the historic site.

In September 2025, the museum received a planning grant from the Mellon Foundation's Humanities in Place program to support the Sieur de Monts location's reimagining from a Wabanaki perspective. The museum expects to reopen the Sieur de Monts location in 2028, in time for its centennial year.

== Collections and archaeology ==
The Abbe's collections represent approximately 12,000 years of Native cultures and history in Maine, with more than 50,000 objects including contemporary art as well as historic and 2,000 artworks and belongings with tens of thousands of archaeological itemsmaterials. Dr. Abbe's original collection of stone artifacts includes projectile points; bone artifacts include harpoons, hooks, combs, and a flute that may be as old as 2,000 years. The collection also includes a powder horn attributed to Penobscot Chief Orono.

The museum holds the world's largest and best-documented collection of Maine Native American basketry, built up over decades of acquisitions and major donations. The core of the founding collection was assembled by Dr. Robert Abbe, who retired to Mount Desert Island after health difficulties stemming from his pioneering work with radiation.

== Decolonization initiative and recent leadership ==
Since 2015, the Abbe Museum has been recognized as a national leader in museum decolonization (the process of restructuring institutional practices, governance, and interpretation to center Indigenous authority and cultural self-determination).

Under President and CEO Cinnamon Catlin-Legutko, who led the museum from 2009 until 2019, the museum committed to an organizational mandate to decolonize, described by the museum's peers as the first nontribal museum to do so. As part of its decolonization process, the museum restructured its Board of Trustees to achieve a mandated Wabanaki majority, and implemented Wabanaki-designed policies for collections and interpretative frameworks.

Carrying on the new Wabanaki-governed model, in February 2020, the Abbe's Board of Trustees appointed Christopher Newell, a citizen of the Passamaquoddy Tribe at Indian Township, as Executive Director and Senior Partner to Wabanaki Nations. He was the first member of the Wabanaki Nations to lead the museum and served through 2021.

=== Betsy Richards (2022-present) ===
In July 2022, the Abbe Board of Trustees appointed Betsy Richards, a citizen of the Cherokee Nation, as its Executive Director. With her appointment, the museum became one of only a few non-tribal museums focused on Indigenous cultures with an Indigenous woman in the chief executive role.

== Dawnland Festival of Arts and Ideas ==
The Abbe Museum's annual Dawnland Festival of Arts and Ideas is a multi-day arts and cultures festival held on the campus of the College of the Atlantic in Bar Harbor. The festival brings together Wabanaki and other Northeastern Native artists, thought leaders, and culture bearers to share stories, creativity, and perspectives that shape our world today.

Programming includes a Northeastern Native artist marketplace, panel discussions, live performances, and demonstrations. The festival is free and open to the public.

The festival debuted in July 2024 and drew well over a thousand attendees in its second year in 2025. It evolved from the museum's long-running Abbe Museum Indian Market, which returned in June 2023 after a three-year hiatus, hosting over 50 Wabanaki and other Indigenous artists.

In 2026, the festival entered a collaboration with the Smithsonian Center for Folklife and Cultural Heritage's Of the People: Festival of Festivals, making it the only New England-based festival participating in that national initiative.

=== 2025 festival ===
The 2025 festival took place July 12–13 at the College of the Atlantic and featured four panel discussions alongside live performances and a 50+ artist marketplace.

==== Panels ====
Panel 1 – Native Arts, Cultures, & Technology
"Technology should be for the people—intergenerational, interdisciplinary, and intentional." — Ty Defoe How do Native artists, language stewards, and digital creatives navigate the evolving landscape of culture and technology? This thought-provoking panel brings together three powerful voices to explore how Indigenous knowledge systems continue to shape and be shaped by technology—from VR storytelling to digital sovereignty to community-led language apps.
- Ty _Defoe (Ojibwe + Oneida Nations), Grammy Award–winning interdisciplinary artist and futurist
- Nolan Altvater (Passamaquoddy), Passamaquoddy photographer, advocate, and educator
- Dwayne Tomah (Passamaquoddy Nation), language keeper and co-creator of Apple's Passamaquoddy language app

Panel 2 – Wabanaki Forest Futures
Addressing forest management, ash tree protection, and climate resilience

through the lens of Wabanaki land stewardship and traditional ecological knowledge.

- Tyler Everett (Mi'kmaq Nation), University of Maine forestry researcher
- Chuck Loring (Penobscot Nation), Penobscot Nation director of cultural resources
- Richard Silliboy (Mi'kmaq Nation), master basketmaker and former vice chief

Panel 3 – Centering Wabanaki Voices in America's 250th
"Every day for Indigenous people is an act of resistance." — Zeke Crofton‑McDonald As the U.S. prepares to mark its 250th anniversary, this panel asks: What does it mean to commemorate a nation built on Indigenous land and often in opposition to Indigenous sovereignty?
- Zeke Crofton-MacDonald (Houlton Band of Maliseet), tribal ambassador
- James Francis (Penobscot Nation), Penobscot Nation director of cultural and historical preservation and an artist
- Siera Hyte (Cherokee Nation), curator of Indigenous American art, Virginia Museum of Fine Arts

Panel 4 – Indigenous Farm to Table
Exploring farming, food systems, culinary excellence, and well-being through the lens of Indigenous food sovereignty.
- Dawn Spears (Narragansett), artist, Native arts consultant, and co-owner of Ashawaug Farm
- Cassius Spears (Narragansett), agricultural expert, cultural educator, and co-owner of Ashawaug Farm
- Anthony Sutton (Passamaquoddy Nation), assistant professor of Native American studies and food systems, University of Maine
- Jasmine Thompson-Tintor (Penobscot Nation), restaurateur and food sovereignty advocate

==== Performers ====
- Ty Defoe (Ojibwe/Oneida Nations), Grammy Award-winning interdisciplinary artist
- Cipelahq ehpicik – Thunderbird Women, a Wabanaki women's hand drum group

== Architecture ==
The Sieur de Monts building was designed by architect Edmund M. Gilchrist and completed in 1928. The structure is stylistically distinctive, blending elements of Spanish Colonial Revival architecture and the Italian Renaissance. It features a unique octagonal gallery space designed in consultation with Dr. Abbe to specifically display his collection. The building is listed on the National Register of Historic Places and is considered the only non-domestic example of Mediterranean architecture in Maine and the state's first purpose-built museum building.

== See also ==
- Wabanaki Confederacy
- Acadia National Park
- Sieur de Monts Spring
- Passamaquoddy people
- Penobscot people
