= Madonna Soctomah =

Passamaquoddy politician

Madonna M. Soctomah is a Passamaquoddy politician from Maine. Soctomah represented the Passamaquoddy people as a non-voting tribal representative in the Maine House of Representatives. She has been elected by her people to four two-year terms (2000, 2002, 2010, 2012).

Soctomah has been a persistent advocate for a Passamaquoddy-owned casino in Maine. During her first term in the House of Representatives, Soctomah introduced a bill allowing her tribe to operate a casino. In 2012, Soctomah again introduced a bill to create a gaming facility in Washington County.

== See also ==
- List of Native American politicians
- Native American women in politics
