= Jeremy Frey =

Native American basket maker from Maine, U.S.

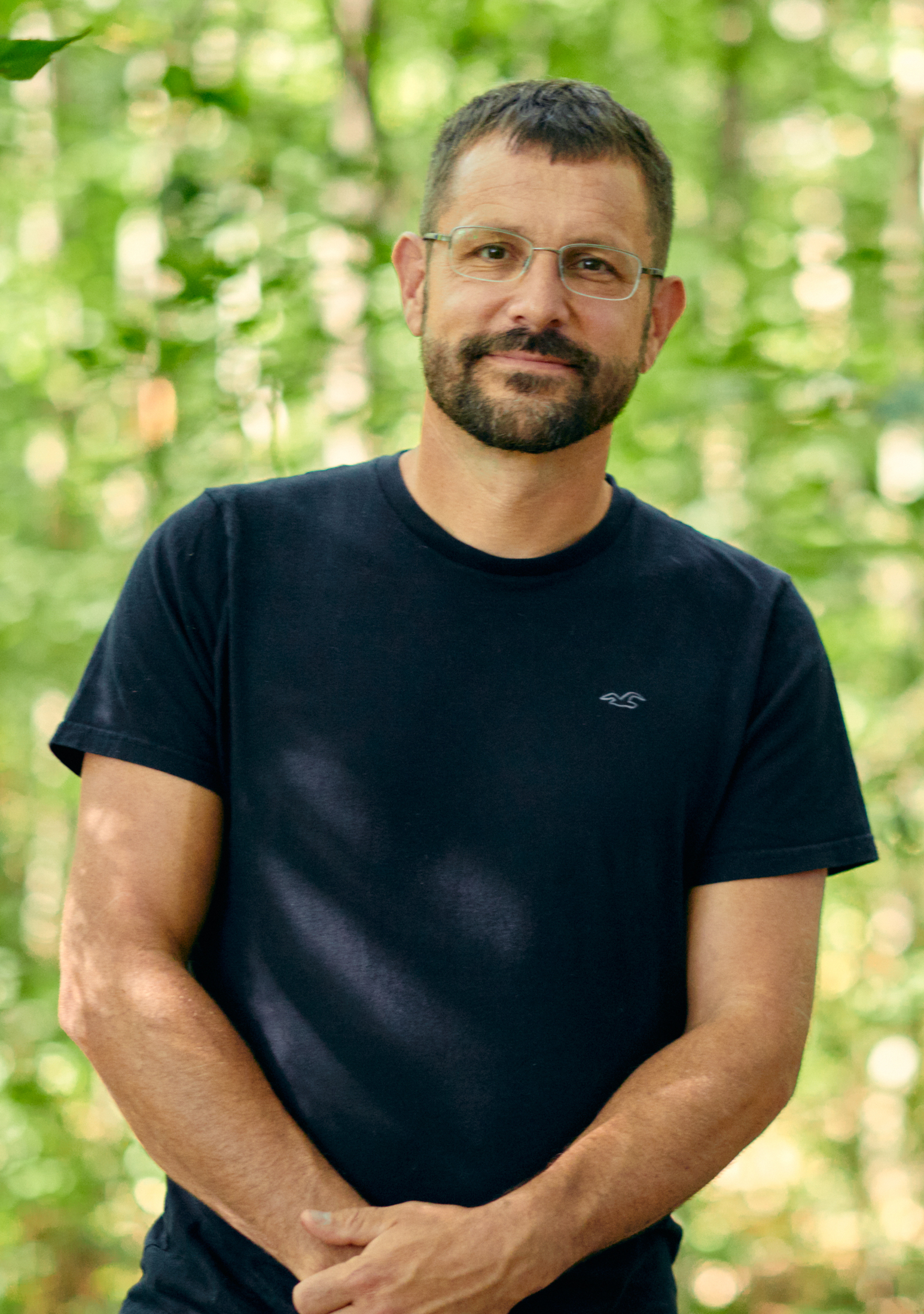
- Born: 1978 (age 47–48); Passamaquoddy Indian Township Reservation, Maine
- Citizenship: Passamaquoddy Tribe and U.S.
- Education: Maine Indian Basketmakers Alliance
- Known for: Brown ash basketry
- Awards: MacArthur Fellowship 2025; Rapaport Art Prize 2024

Jeremy Frey (born 1978) is a Passamaquoddy basket maker from the U.S. state of Maine. He harvests materials and weaves baskets using ancestral Wabanaki Passamaquoddy techniques. His mid-career retrospective, Jeremy Frey: Woven, toured multiple museums around the country in 2025. He received the Rapaport Prize in 2024 and a MacArthur Fellowship in 2025 for his basket making.

== Early life and education ==
Jeremy Frey was born and raised in the Passamaquoddy Indian Township Reservation, and from a young age, he painted and made his own toys.

== Career ==
He worked kitchen jobs during his early 20s and suffered from addiction. He soon returned home to clean up from his addiction and began learning traditional Wabanaki basket weaving, as his mother was also studying. He studied at workshops run by the Maine Indian Basketmakers Alliance, and became a basketmaker himself. Soon, in 2011, his baskets received Best in Show at both the Southwestern Association for Indian Arts and the Heard Museum.

He is noted for crafting his baskets utilizing materials including porcupine quills, brown ash, cedar, sweet grass, and spruce root, and for utilizing much smaller weaves than is traditional (32nd of an inch as opposed to a quarter of an inch). He has also began utilizing copper strips in his art as a response to the Emerald ash borer. His art has been described as "dizzying" and "kaleidoscopic".

== Exhibitions ==
He had his first major retrospective and traveling exhibition, Jeremy Frey: Woven, begin in 2024. It has so far appeared in the Portland Museum of Art, where it was the second-most visited exhibition, the Bruce Museum, the Art Institute of Chicago, and the Cantor Arts Center.

== Awards and honors ==
He was awarded a MacArthur Fellowship in 2025 for his basket weaving. He was awarded the Rapaport Prize, granted to an exceptional artist with connections to New England, in 2024.

== Publications ==
He published his first book, Jeremy Frey: Woven, in connection with his traveling exhibition of the same name.

== Collections ==
His art is in the collections of the Metropolitan Museum of Art, the Smithsonian American Art Museum, the Denver Art Museum, and others.
