= Passamaquoddy =

Ethnic group

Peskotomuhkatiyik
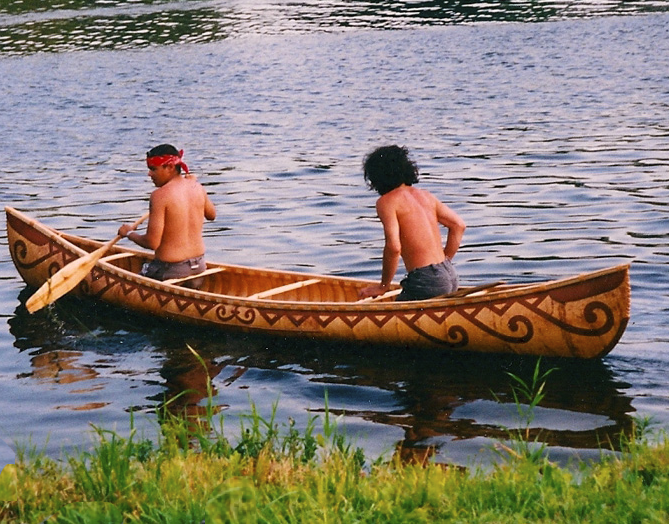
- Passamaquoddy men in a canoe (2016) Locations of the Passamaquoddy reservations and Peskotomuhkati Nation

Total population
- 3,575 enrolled tribal members: Sipayik: 2,005; Motahkomikuk: 1,364; Qonasqamkuk: 206

Regions with significant populations
- United States (Maine): 3,369 (0.3%)
- Canada (New Brunswick): 206 (0.03%)

Languages
- Maliseet-Passamaquoddy, English

Religion
- Wabanaki mythology, Catholicism

Related ethnic groups
- Abenaki, Wolastoqiyik, Mi'kmaq, Penobscot

- Person: Peskotomuhkat
- People: Peskotomuhkatiyik
- Language: Peskotomuhkatuwey
- Country: Peskotomuhkatihkuk; Wabanaki

The Passamaquoddy (Passamaquoddy: Peskotomuhkati, Plural: Peskotomuhkatiyik) are a Native American/First Nations people who live in northeastern North America. Their traditional homeland, Peskotomuhkatikuk, straddles the Canadian province of New Brunswick and the U.S. state of Maine in a region called Dawnland. They are one of the constituent nations of the Wabanaki Confederacy.

The Passamaquoddy Tribe in Maine is a federally recognized tribe. The Passamaquoddy people in Canada have an organization known as the Peskotomuhkati Nation, but it does not have official First Nations status.

== Etymology ==
The name "Passamaquoddy" is an anglicization of the Passamaquoddy word peskotomuhkati, the prenoun form (prenouns being a linguistic feature of Algonquian languages) of Peskotomuhkat (pestəmohkat), their endonym, or the name that they use for themselves. Peskotomuhkat literally means "pollock-spearer" or "those of the place where pollock are plentiful", reflecting the importance of this fish in their culture. Their method of fishing was spear-fishing, rather than angling or using nets. Passamaquoddy Bay is shared by both New Brunswick and Maine; its name was derived by the English settlers from the Passamaquoddy people.

== History ==
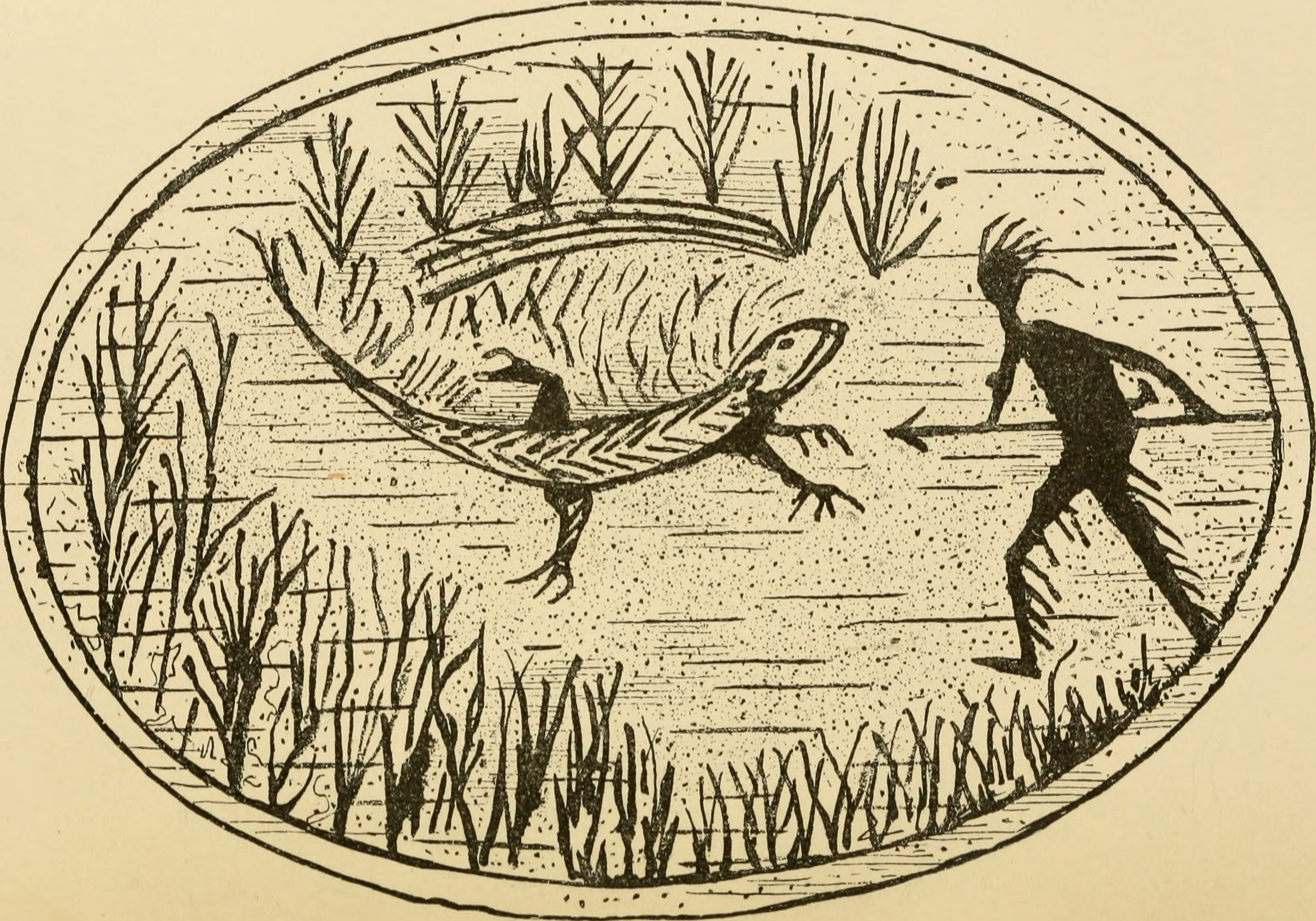
A Passamaquoddy story scraped onto birch bark

The Passamaquoddy have an oral history supported with visual imagery, such as birchbark etching and petrographs prior to European contact. Among the Algonquian-speaking tribes of the loose Wabanaki Confederacy, they occupy coastal regions along the Bay of Fundy, Passamaquoddy Bay, and Gulf of Maine, and along the St. Croix River and its tributaries. Traditionally, they had seasonal patterns of settlement. In the winter, they dispersed and hunted inland. In the summer, they gathered more closely together on the coast and islands, and primarily harvested seafood, including marine mammals, mollusks, crustaceans, and fish.

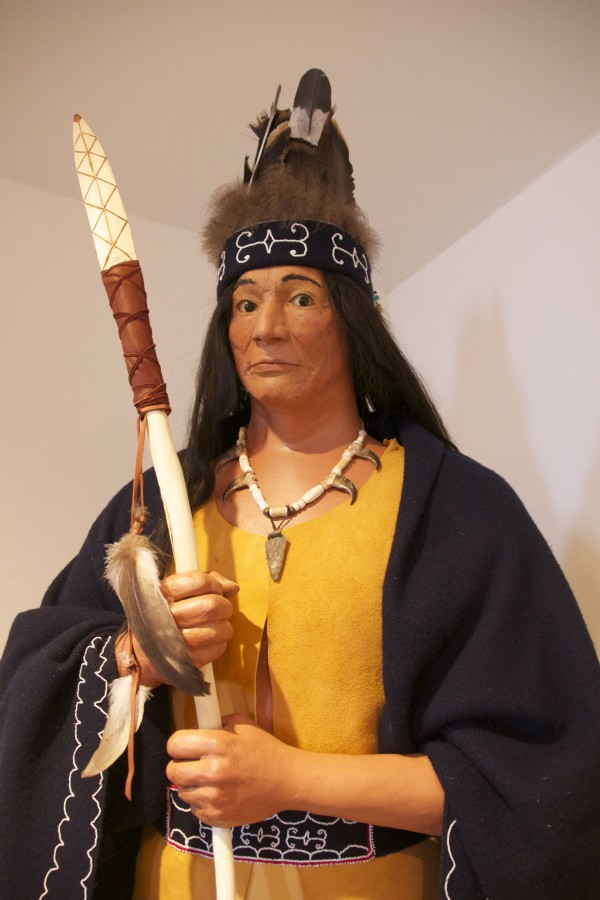
A mannequin representing a 16th-century Passamaquoddy man

Settlers of European descent repeatedly forced the Passamaquoddy off their original lands from the 1800s. After the United States achieved independence from Great Britain, the tribe was eventually officially limited to the current Indian Township Reservation, at 45°15′57″N 67°36′43″W, in eastern Washington County, Maine. It has a land area of 37.45 square miles (97.0 km^{2}) and a 2000 census resident population of 676 persons. They also control the small Passamaquoddy Pleasant Point Reservation in eastern Washington County, which has a land area of 0.5 square miles (1.3 km^{2}) and a population of 749, per the 2010 census.

Location of Passamaquoddy off-reservation trust lands

The Passamaquoddy tribe gained federal recognition in 1976. On September 9, 1980, through an act of Congress, the Maine Indian Claims Settlement Act reduced certain elements of Passamaquoddy sovereignty and land claims.

== Populations and languages ==
The total Passamaquoddy population is around 3,576 people. About 500 people, most if not all over the age of 50, speak the Maliseet-Passamaquoddy language, shared (other than minor differences in dialect) with the neighboring and related Wolastoqiyik people. It belongs to the Algonquian branch of the Algic language family. The University of Maine published a comprehensive Passamaquoddy Dictionary in 2008. Another resource for the language is the online Passamaquoddy-Maliseet Language Portal, which includes many videos, subtitled in English and Passamaquoddy, of native speakers conversing in the language. Most of the people speak English as their first language.

While the Passamaquoddy population in Canada is much smaller than that in Maine, there is an organization called the Peskotomuhkati Nation, with a formal structure and a chief, Hugh Akagi. Most of its people speak French and English. It is not recognized by the Canadian government as constituting a First Nation. In 2004, Chief Akagi was authorized to represent the Passamaquoddy at events marking the 400th anniversary of French settlement of St Croix Island (the first French effort at permanent settlement in the New World). This indicates that the government had acknowledged the tribe to some extent, and progress is being made in formal recognition.

== Special political status in Maine ==
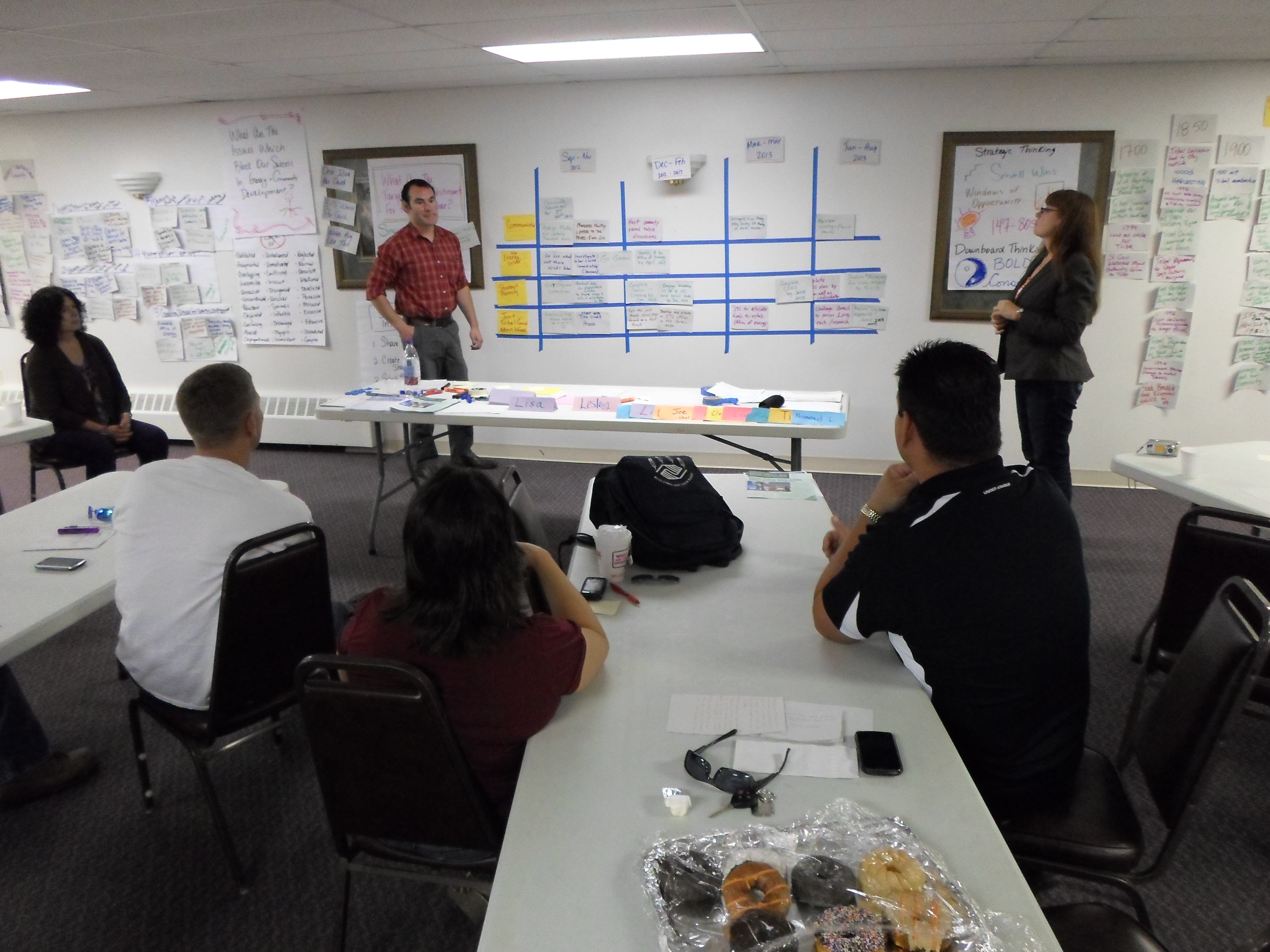
The START energy planning workshop held at the Passamaquoddy Tribes of Indian Township and Pleasant Point in Maine

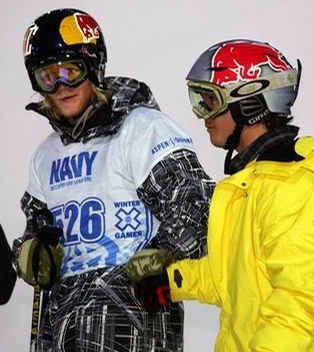
Tanner Hall and Simon Dumont at the winter X Games in 2008

The Passamaquoddy, along with the neighboring Penobscot, are given special political status in Maine. Both groups are allowed to send a nonvoting representative to the Maine House of Representatives. Although these representatives cannot vote, they may sponsor any legislation regarding American Indian affairs, and may co-sponsor any other legislation.

== Notable Passamaquoddy ==
- David Moses Bridges (Passamaquoddy, 1962–2017), Sipayik, birchbark artist and canoe maker
- Simon Dumont, freestyle skier
- Jeremy Frey, MacArthur Fellowship recipient and basketmaker.
- Tomah Joseph (1837–1914), governor, guide, and artist
- Francis Joseph Neptune, former Sakom
- Molly Neptune Parker, master basketmaker
- Geo Soctomah Neptune, master basketmaker
- Rena Newell, tribal member of the Maine House of Representatives
- Donald Soctomah, former tribal state representative, tribal historic preservation officer
- Madonna Soctomah, tribal council member, former state representative

== Maps ==
Maps showing the approximate locations of areas occupied by members of the Wabanaki Confederacy (from north to south):

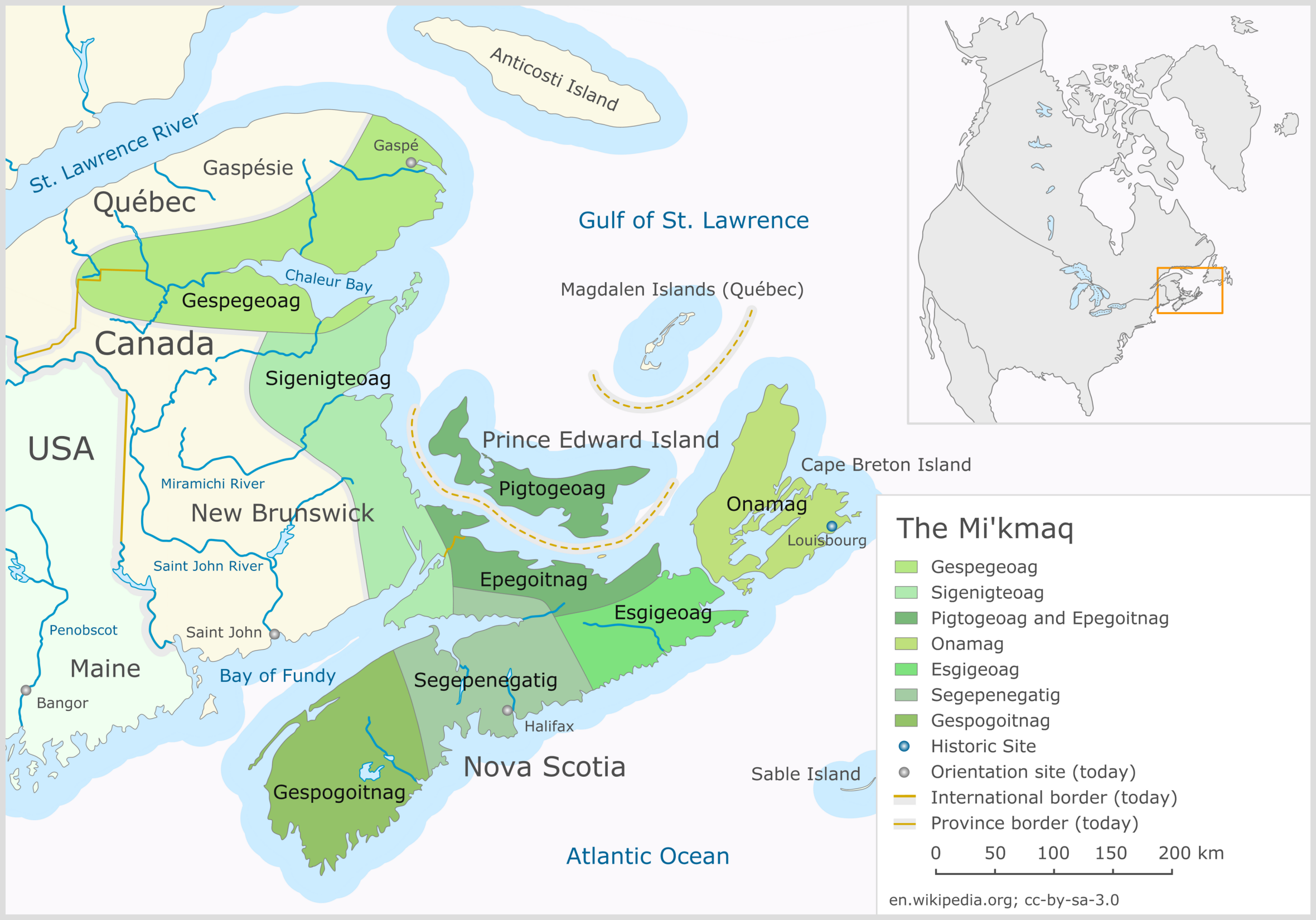
Miꞌkmaq

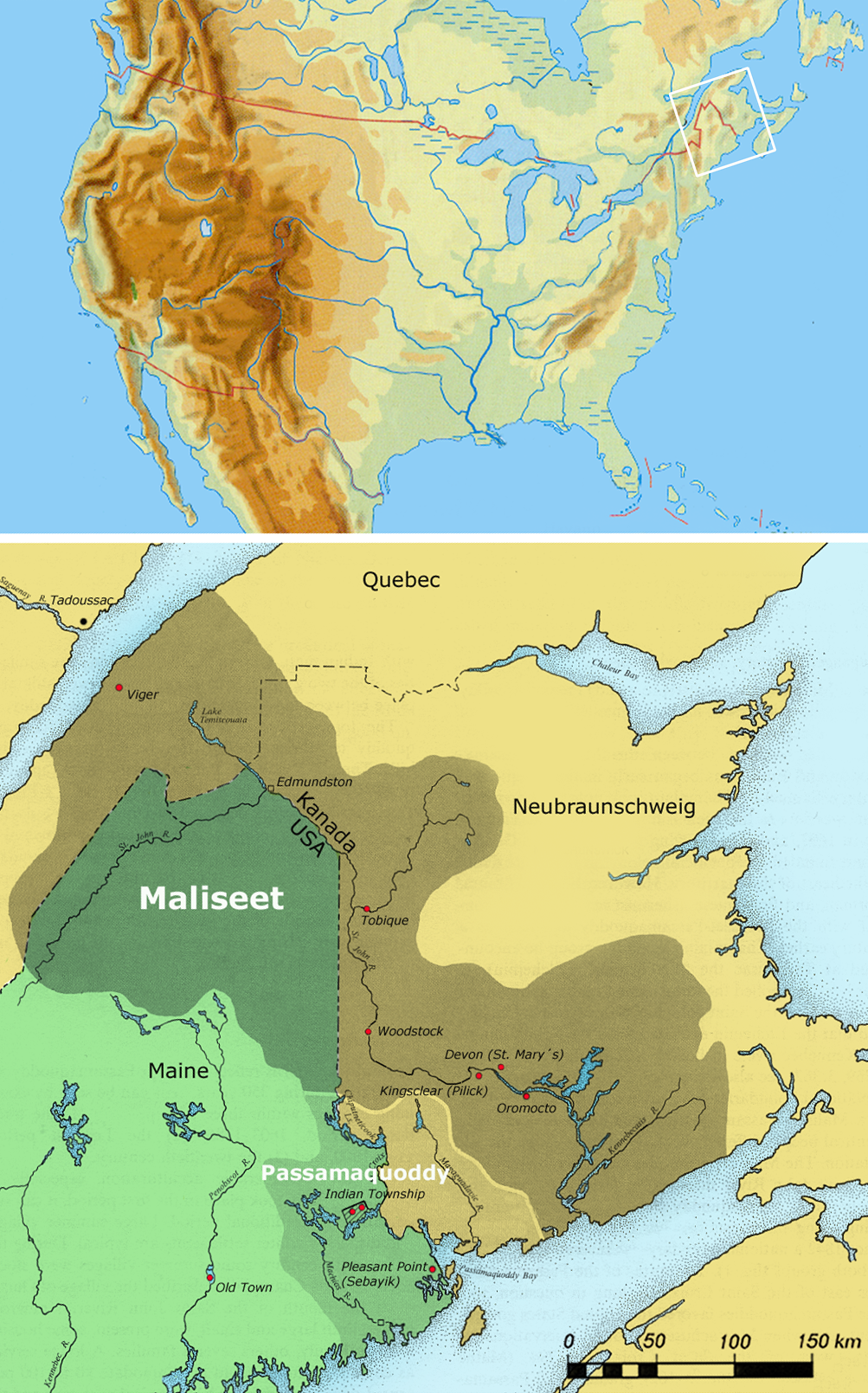
Wolastoqiyik, Passamaquoddy

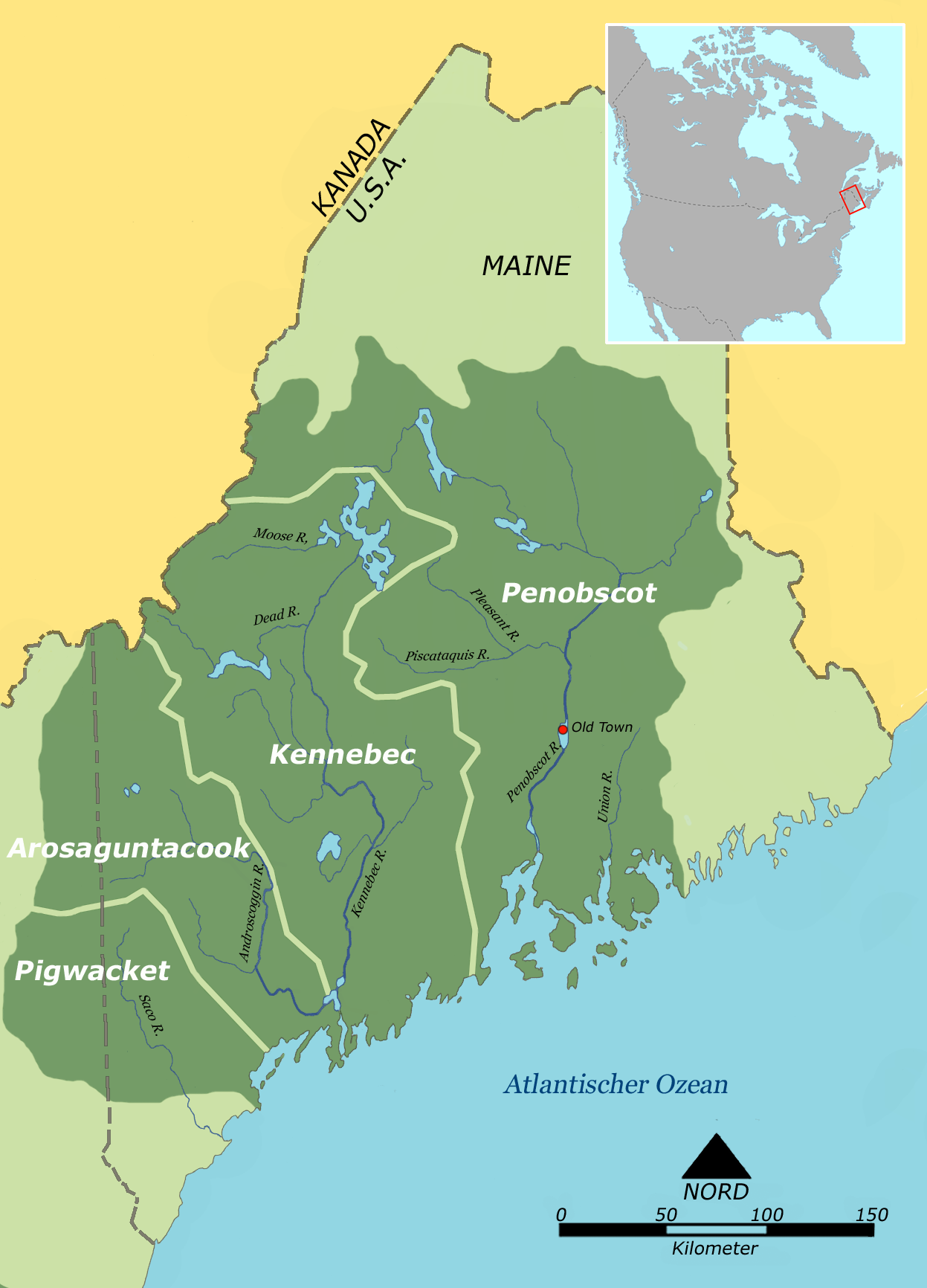
Eastern Abenaki (Penobscot, Kennebec, Arosaguntacook, Pigwacket/Pequawket)

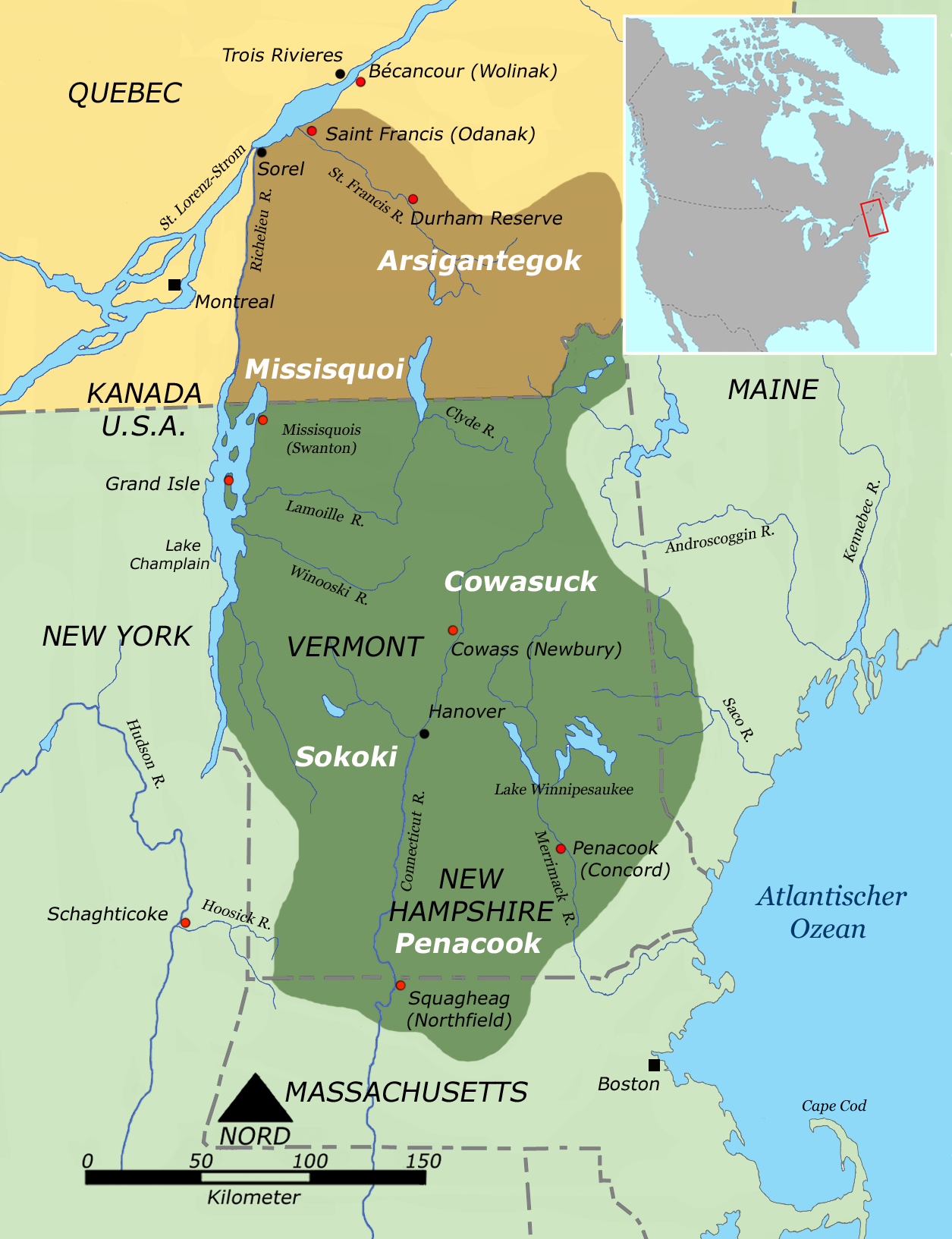
Western Abenaki (Arsigantegok, Missisquoi, Cowasuck, Sokoki, Pennacook

== See also ==
- Joint Tribal Council of the Passamaquoddy Tribe v. Morton (1st Cir. 1975)
- Passanaquoddy Tribe reacquires stolen land on Pine Island, Bangor Daily News 18 May 2021
