= Wabanaki Confederacy =

Native American and First Nations Wabanaki Nation

Wabanaki Confederacy/Alliance Wabana'ki Mawuhkacik
- 1680s–1862, 1993–present
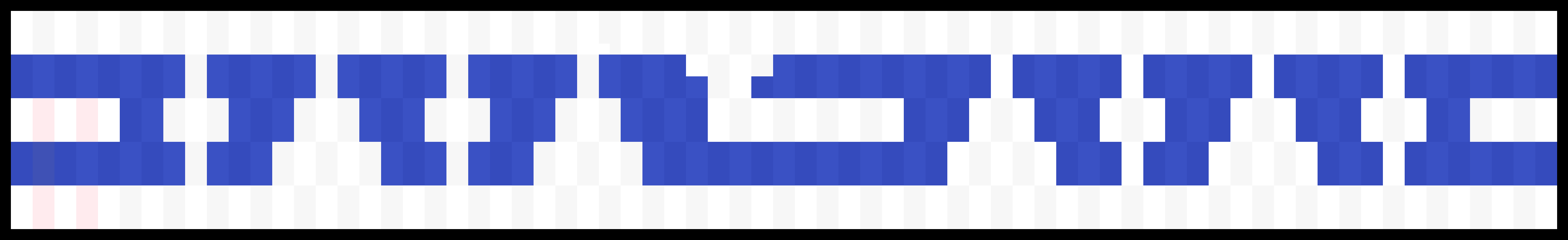
- Wampum belt Seal

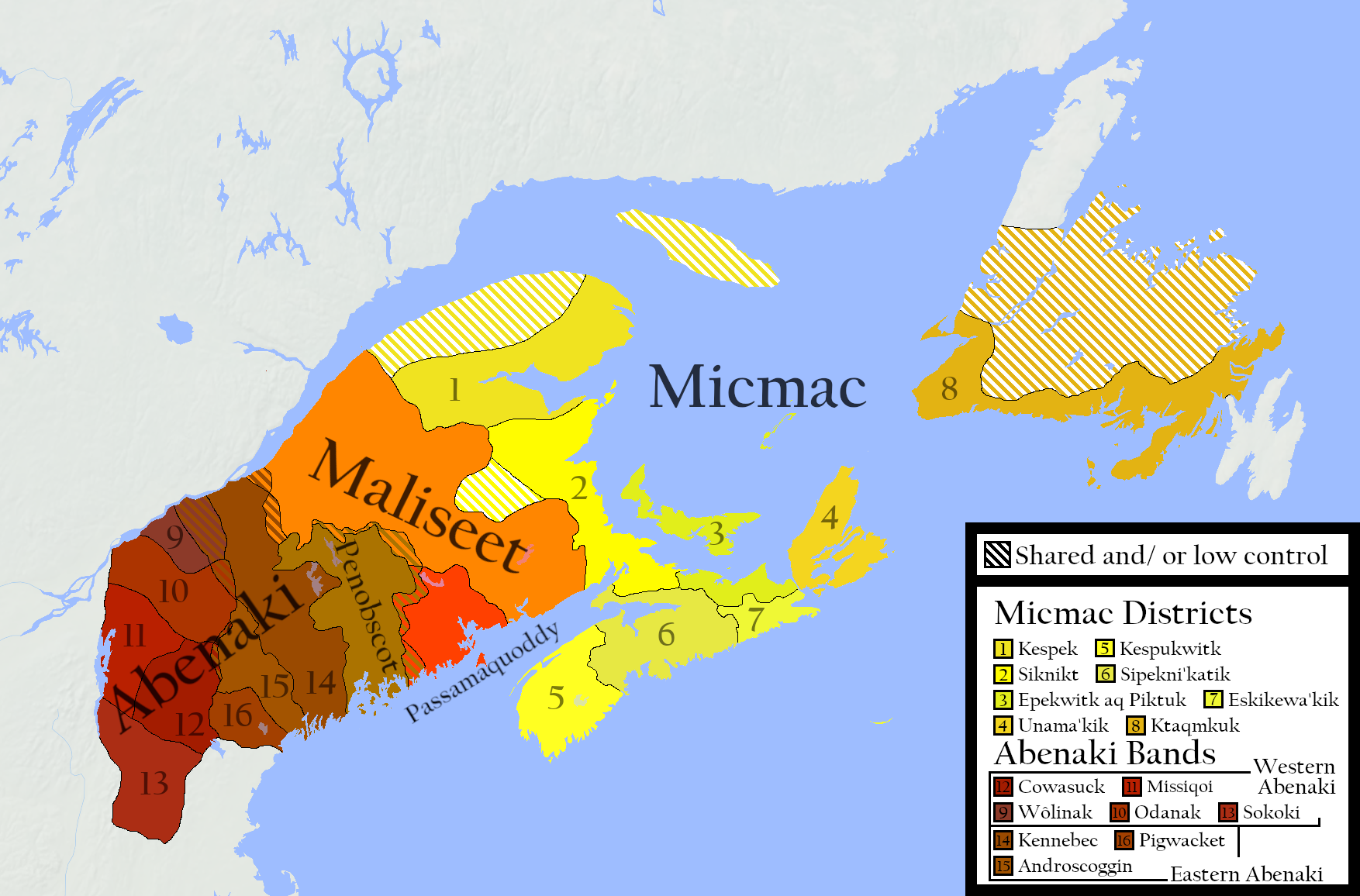
- Capital: Panawamskek, Odanak, Sipayik, Lakeland Ridges, and Eelsetkook
- Recognised regional languages: Abenaki; Wolastoqey-Passamaquoddy; Mi'kmawi'simk; English; French
- Religion: Traditional belief systems, including Midewiwin and Glooscap narratives; Christianity, mainly Jesuits
- Demonym: Wabanakiyak (Note: Each nation has a different word for "Dawnland people" or "people of the dawn." "Wabankiyak" is the closest English approximation that takes into consideration each of the Wabanaki languages: In Mi'kmawi'simk, it is: Wapna'kikewaq. For the Maliseet and Passamaquoddy languages, a singular person from Dawnland is a Waponahkew, and multiple people are Waponahkiyik or Waponahkewiyik. And, in the Abenaki language, it is W8banakiiak.)
- Constituent countries: Mi'kma'ki; Wolastokuk; Peskotomuhkatihkuk; Pαnawαhpskewahki; Ndakinna
- Government: Tribal Confederation
- History
  - Established: 1680s–1862, 1993–present
- Today part of: Canada; United States

The Wabanaki Confederacy (Wabenaki, Wobanaki, translated to 'People of the Dawn' or 'Easterner'; also: Wabanakia, 'Dawnland') is a North American First Nations and Native American confederation of five principal Eastern Algonquian nations: the Abenaki, Mi'kmaq, Wolastoqiyik, Passamaquoddy (Peskotomuhkati), and Penobscot.

There were more tribes, along with many bands, that were once part of the Confederation. Native tribes such as the Nanrantsouak, Alemousiski, Pennacook, Sokoki, and Canibas, through massacres, tribal consolidation, and ethnic label shifting were absorbed into the five larger national identities.

Members of the Wabanaki Confederacy, the Wabanakiyak, are located in and named for the area which they call Wabanaki ("Dawnland"), (Note: "Dawnland" in Mi'kmawi'simk is Wapna'ki; in the Maliseet and Passamaquoddy languages, it is Waponahkik; and, in the Abenaki language, the term for the region is W8banaki.) roughly the area that became the French colony of Acadia and northern New England. The territory boundaries encompass present-day Maine, New Hampshire, and Vermont, in the United States, and New Brunswick, mainland Nova Scotia, Cape Breton Island, Prince Edward Island and some of Quebec south of the St. Lawrence River, Anticosti, and Newfoundland in Canada.

== Name and etymology ==
The word Wabanaki is derived from the Algonquian root word "wab", combined with the word for "land", being "aki". "Wab" is a root that is used for the following concepts:

Algonquian word	English meaning
Wabi	He sees/sight
Waban	East
Wában	Sunlight
Wabish	White
Bidaban (Bid-waban)	Dawn
Wasseia	The light

Waban-aki can be translated in a number of ways but is most often translated into "Dawnland".

The Wabanaki Confederacy was known by many names, but it is remembered as "Wabanaki", which shares a common etymological origin with the name of the "Abenaki" people. All Abenaki are Wabanaki, but not all Wabanaki are Abenaki.

Historically, the confederacy went by many other names, some shared and some unique to individual members. The Mi'kmaq, Passamaquoddy, and Wolastoqey called it Buduswagan ("convention council"). The Passamaquoddy also had their own unique name: Tolakutinaya ("related to one another"). Finally, the Penobscot interchangeably called it Bezegowak ("those united into one") and Gizangowak ("completely united").

== Early contact period (1497–1680s) ==
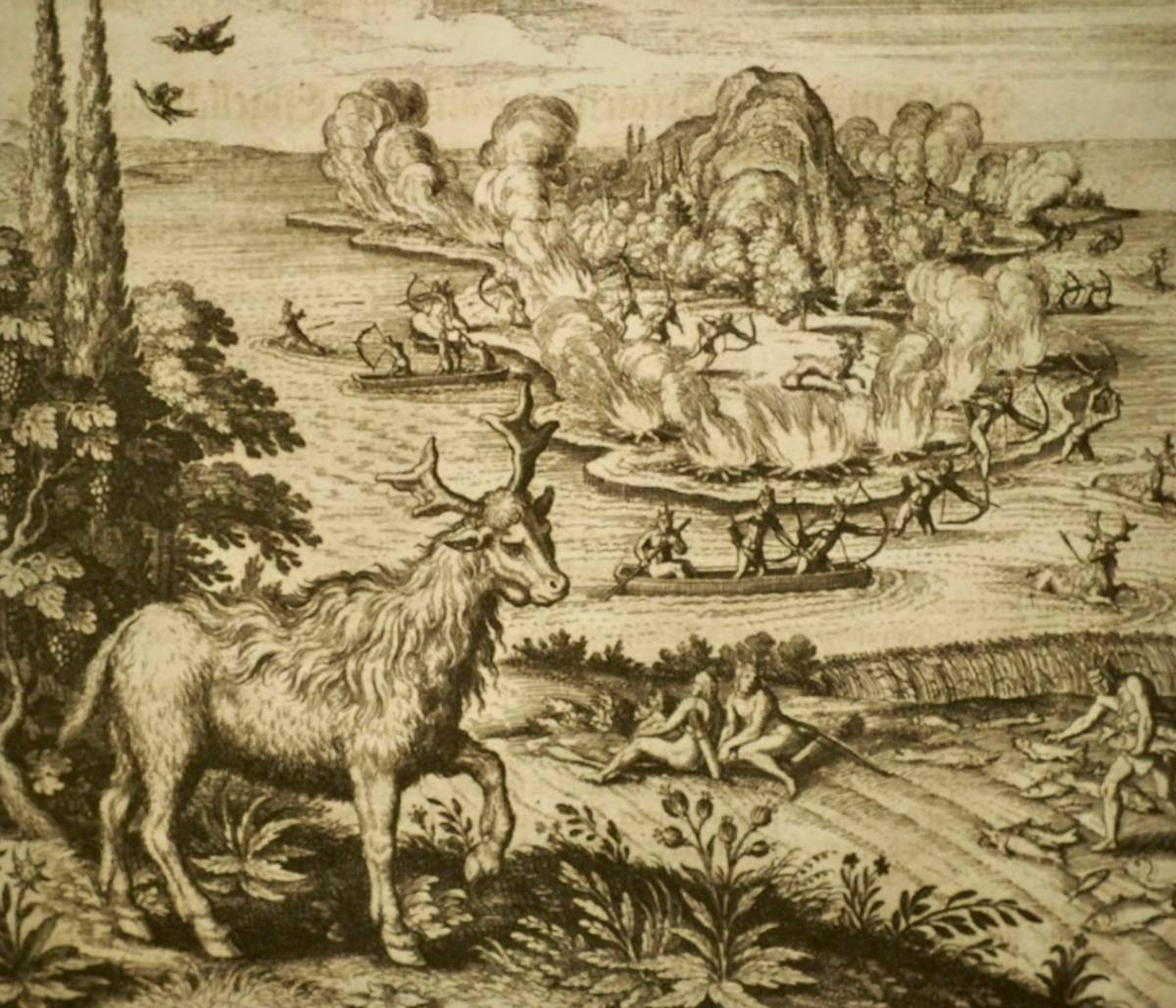
1627 illustration by Mattheüs Merian of local people hunting using fire, canoes and bows and harvesting corn on Pesamkuk (Mount Desert Island).

Small-scale confederacies in and around what would become the Wabanaki Confederacy were common at the time of post-Viking European contact. The earliest known confederacy was the Mawooshen Confederacy located within the historic Eastern Penobscot cultural region. Its capital, Kadesquit, located around modern Bangor, Maine, would play a significant role as a political hub—for the future Wabanaki Confederacy, for example.

In 1500, Portuguese explorer Gaspar Corte-Real reached Wabanaki lands. He captured and enslaved at least 57 people from modern-day Newfoundland and Nova Scotia, selling them in Europe to help finance his trip. The rich fishing waters full of cod in and around the Gulf of Saint Lawrence attracted many Europeans to this area. By 1504, French Bretons were fishing off the coast of Nova Scotia. Norman fishermen began to arrive around 1507, and they too would start kidnapping people from the surrounding land. This would hurt relations with some tribes. But the fishermen also started slowly introducing European trade goods to the Wabanaki, returning to Europe with North American trade goods.

After the establishment of the Treaty of Tordesillas by which Catholic Europe established spheres of influence for exploration, Portuguese explorers commonly believed that Newfoundland and Wabanaki lands were on the Portuguese side of the Inter caetera, entitling them to the land. Portuguese explorer João Álvares Fagundes attempted to establish the first European colony in Wabanaki lands in 1525. He brought families totaling almost 200 people, mostly from the Azores, and founded a fishing settlement in Cape Breton, within Mi'kmaq territory. The settlement lasted at least until 1570, as fishing ships brought news of them back to Europe. The fate of the settlement is unknown, but the people would have interacted with the local Mi'kmaq.

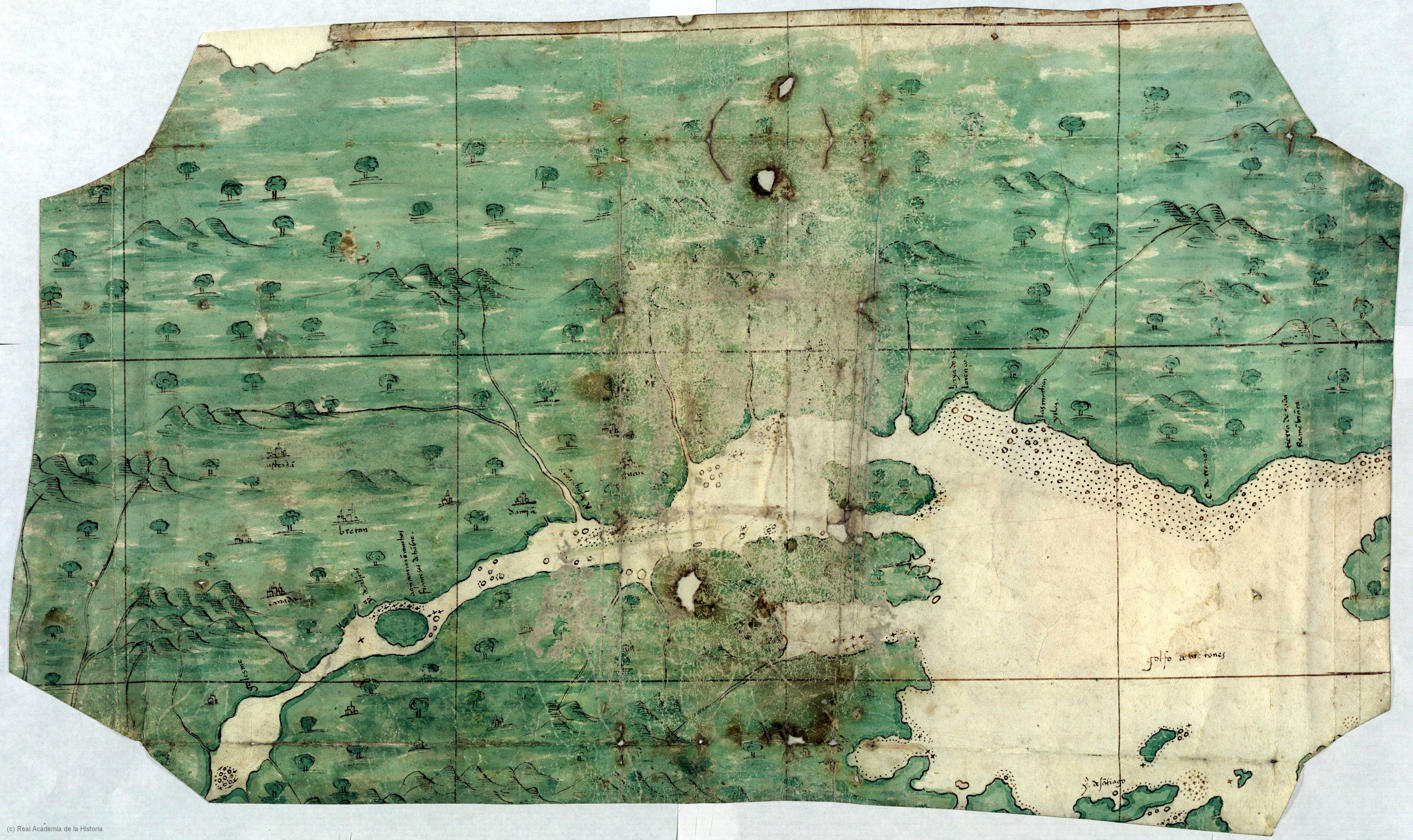
This Spanish chart of the Saint Lawrence River showing Wabanaki lands at the bottom, from ca. 1541, contains a legend in front of the "isla de Orliens" that says: "Here many French died of hunger"; possibly alluding to Cartier's second settlement in 1535–1536

Throughout the 1500s, Wabanaki people encountered many European fishermen along with explorers looking for the Northwest Passage. They were at risk of being captured and enslaved. For instance, Portuguese explorer Estevan Gomez reached Wabanaki lands in 1525, kidnapping a few dozen people and taking them back to Spain, where he was forced to release them. The Crown did not arrange their passage back.

Italian explorer Giovanni da Verrazzano also reached Wabanaki lands. He was documented capturing a native boy to bring back to France around 1525. Around 1534 French explorer Jacques Cartier would explore the Gulf of Saint Lawrence and traded with Mi'kmaq people living in Chaleur Bay. He encountered people now known as St. Lawrence Iroquoians on the Gaspé Bay. These are now believed to have been independent of the Five Nations of Haudenosaunee that developed the Haudenosaunee Confederacy further south. By the early 1600s, the St. Lawrence Iroquoian villages were abandoned. Historians now believe they may have been defeated by the Mohawk in competition over hunting. They may also have been defeated by Algonquins from further east in the St. Lawrence Valley.

Cartier traded with the Mi'kmaq, and returned to France with furs of North American animals such as beaver, which became high-demand items. Cartier brought back numerous goods from the First Nations from his three trips to the St. Lawrence, but the furs had the greatest demand. French colonists went to the area to work in what became the North American fur trade.

More Europeans entered Wabanaki lands over the coming decades, where they started as traders to meet the growing fur demand in Europe. The French established permanent trading operations with the Wabanaki around 1581 to obtain furs. Henry III of France granted a fur monopoly to French merchants in 1588. This would lead to the desire for the French to establish permanent trade posts in and around Wabanaki lands for furs. French fur traders like François Gravé Du Pont would often travel to Wabanaki lands to obtain furs, establishing the French fur trading site of Tadoussac in 1599. During one of his trips back in 1603 he would bring Samuel de Champlain with him, and he would lead to a new era of Wabanaki/French relationships.

When Champlain established contact during an expedition to the Mawooshen in Pesamkuk (present-day Mount Desert Island, Maine) in 1604, he noted that the people had quite a few European goods. Champlain had a positive encounter on Pemetic, meeting with sakom (title for community leaders) Asticou in his and his peoples' summer village. Asticou was a sakom with regional power over the eastern door of Mawooshen. He was subsidiary to sakom Bashaba, who led the entire Mawooshen Confederacy. Champlain went upriver to the Passamaquoddy, where he established another post at present-day Saint Croix Island, Maine. The French colonial region known as Acadia developed on existing tribal territory. The ethnic French of Acadia and the peoples of Wabanaki coexisted in the same territory with independent, yet allied governments.

Champlain continued to establish settlements throughout Wabanaki territory, including Saint John (1604) and Quebec City (1608), among others. The trade and military relations between the French and the local Algonquin tribes, including the Mawooshen and later Wabanaki, lasted until the end of the Seven Years' War. Asticou approved the founding of a Jesuit mission in 1613 in the present-day location on Somes Sound, Maine.

The following year the mission village was destroyed by Captain Samuel Argall during a resupply visit to nearby English fishing outposts. French and English colonists would long compete for territory in North America. In the same year, Captain Thomas Hunt kidnapped 27 people from present-day Massachusetts to sell as slaves in Spain. The famous Tisquantum was among the captives.

English colonists established contacts with the Mawooshen in 1605. Captain George Weymouth met with them in a large village on the Kennebec River. He took five people as captives to take back to England, where they were questioned about settlements by Sir Ferdinando Gorges. Sakom Tahánedo was the only one of those captives known to have returned home. He accompanied settlers of the short-lived Popham Colony (1607–1608), who hoped to establish good relations with the local peoples by returning Tahánedo, but local tribes were uneasy about the English colony.

In 2020 journalist Avery Yale Kamila wrote that the account of the Weymouth voyage has culinary significance because it "is the first time a European recorded the Native American use of nut milks and nut butters."

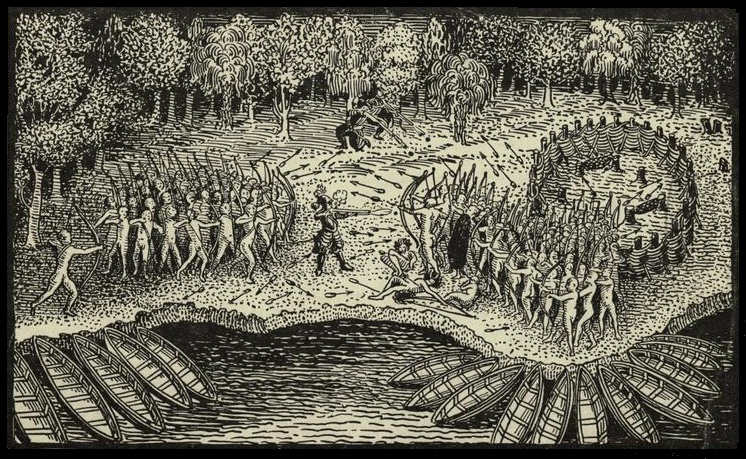
Samuel de Champlain fighting on July 30, 1609, alongside the Western Abenaki in a successful battle against the Haudenosaunee at Lake Champlain

Champlain forged strong French relations with Algonquin tribes up until his death in 1635. Somewhere in the area near Ticonderoga and Crown Point, New York (historians dispute the site), Champlain and his party encountered a group of Haudenosaunee (likely mostly Mohawk, the easternmost nation). In a battle that began the next day, 250 Haudenosaunee advanced on Champlain's position, and one of his guides pointed out the three chiefs. In his account of the battle, Champlain recounts firing his arquebus and killing two of them with a single shot, after which one of his men killed the third. The Haudenosaunee turned and fled. This action set the tone for poor French-Haudenosaunee relations for the rest of the century, with conflicts arising over territory and the beaver trade.

The next year the Battle of Sorel started on 19 June 1610. Champlain had convinced some tribes to fight in the war, amongst them was Wendat, Algonquin and Innu peoples, with some French regulars. They fought against the Mohawk people at present-day Sorel-Tracy, Quebec. Champlain's forces were armed with the arquebus. After engaging their opponent, they slaughtered or captured nearly all of the Mohawk. The battle ended major hostilities with the Mohawk for twenty years.

In and around this time, more French arrived as traders in Nova Scotia. The French migrants formed settlements such as Port-Royal. At many of these settlements, the French traded weapons and other European goods to the local Mi'kmaq. The influx of European goods changed the social and economic landscape, as local tribes became more dependent on European goods. This new economic reality harmed their existing kinship ties among clans and reduced the reciprocal exchange that had supported the local economy. Subsistence hunting shifted into a competition for animals like beaver and for access to European settlements. Population movements, and intraband and interband disputes were affected.

Allied with the Wolastoquiyik (Maleseet) and Passamaquoddy, the Mi'kmaq fought with their Western Mawooshen (Western Abenaki/Penobscot) neighbors for goods as trading relations broke down. This power imbalance resulted in war starting around 1607. In 1615 the Mi'kmaq and their allies killed the Mawooshen Grand Chief Bashabas in his village. War was costly for the Mi'kmaq and their allies, but especially for their southern Abenaki/Penobscot adversaries. Many Abenaki villages faced great losses from the war. The war was then followed by a pandemic known as "The Great Dying" (1616–1619), which killed around 70-95% of the local Algonquin population left after the war.

Not long after this widespread local depopulation, Pilgrim settlers from England arrived in November 1620. Algonquin peoples throughout what would become New England began to see Pilgrim settlers settling in their ancestral lands. Southern Abenaki people such as the Alemousiski would soon come into permanent contact with English settlers moving into Massachusetts, as well as their lands in southern Maine under the colonizing efforts of people directed by Ferdinando Gorges and John Mason, respectively. Pannaway Plantation near modern-day Kittery, Maine would both be founded in 1623. Originally founded as fishing and lumber villages, over the decades they developed larger economies and became major population centers in the fledgling economy.

By the 1640s, internal conflicts within the region started to make Haudenosaunee advances harder to combat for what would become the Wabanaki peoples, but also the Algonquian (tribe west of Quebec City), the Innu, and French to manage separately. Aided by French Jesuits, this led to the formation of a large Algonquian league against the Haudenosaunee, who were making significant territorial land gains around the Great Lakes and Saint Lawrence River region. By the 1660s, tribes of Western Abenaki peoples as far south as Massachusetts had joined the league. This defensive alliance would not only prove to be successful, but it helped repair the relationship among the Eastern Algonquians, promoting greater political cooperation in the coming decades.

This growing tension with two large and organized political adversaries, the Haudenosaunee and especially English colonists, over the next 20 years would lead to an Algonquian uprising during King Philip's War (1675–1676), followed by the First Abenaki War (1675–1678). Soon after the many Algonquian tribes fought together in an effort to strengthen both defensive and diplomatic power, a push to make a formal political union would take place leading to the development of the Wabanaki Confederacy.

== Formation of the Wabanaki Confederacy (1680s) ==
The First Abenaki War saw native peoples throughout the Eastern Algonquian lands face a common and powerful enemy, encroaching English colonists. The fighting led to large-scale depopulation of English colonial settlements north of the Saco River in the district of Maine, while Wabanaki people south of the river like the Almouchiquois, would be forced from their ancestral lands. The political situation was complicated, when the Massachusetts Bay Colony was forced to relinquish control of Maine to the heirs of Ferdinando Gorges in 1676. This required them to find the heirs to buy back the land making up Maine, and then to issue grants for people to settle once again. This conflict as a whole was not without significant losses for the soon-to-be Wabanaki peoples, and it became clear that the tribes would have to work together. The First Abenaki War ended with the Treaty of Casco, which forced all the tribes to recognize the property rights of English colonists in southern Maine. In return, English colonists recognized "Wabanaki" sovereignty by committing themselves to pay Madockawando, as a "grandchief" of the Wabanaki alliance, a symbolic annual fee of "a peck of corn for every English Family." They also recognized the Saco River as the border.

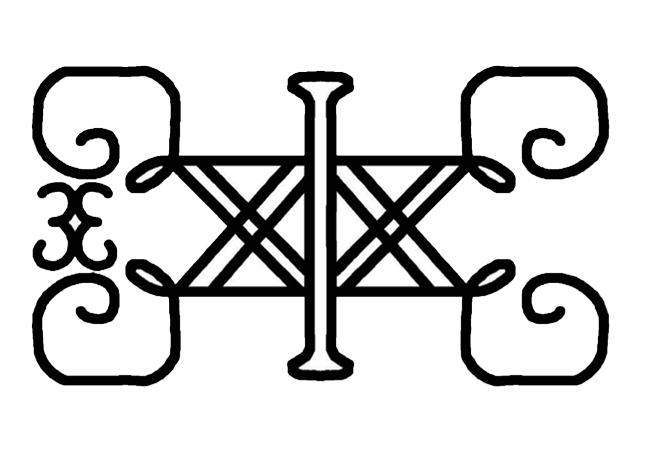
Symbol of the Wabanaki Union of Tribes, still in use. It was originally embroidered onto the ceremonial clothing of sakoms.

The Caughnawaga Council was a large neutral political gathering in the Mohawk territory that occurred every three years for tribes and tribal confederacies within and around the Great Lakes, East Coast, and Saint Lawrence River. At one of these councils in the 1680s, the Eastern Algonquians came together to form their own confederation with the aid of an Ottawa "sakom." The Mawooshen Confederacy, of which Madockawando was part, was put in a situation where it would be absorbed into a larger confederacy that incorporated the tribes into each other's internal politics and would start to hold their own councils as a new political union. In this new union, the tribes would see each other as brothers, as family. The union helped challenge Haudenosaunee hostilities along the Saint Lawrence River over land and resources which was becoming a bigger problem for almost all the Eastern Algonquians to manage separately, but also provided political organization and might to push back collectively against growing English colonial expansionism, as well as mitigating large losses in the recent three-year war with them.

The political union incorporated many political elements from other local confederacies like the Haudenosaunee and Huron, the role of wampum council conduct being a major example. This political unit allowed for the safe passage of people through each of their territories (including camping and subsisting on the land), safer trade networks from the western agricultural centers to the eastern gathering economies (copper/pelts) through non-aggression pacts and sharing natural resources from their respected habitats, freedom to move to each and any of the other's villages along with organizing inter-tribal marriages, and a large-scale defensive alliance to fend off attacks in their now shared territory. Madockawando for instance would later move from Penobscot lands to Wolastoqey lands, living in their political hub of Meductic until his death. These events would lead to the formal creation of what is now called the Wabanaki Confederacy.

The Passamaquoddy wampum record or Wapapi Akonutomakonol tells about the event that took place at the Caughnawaga Council that led to the formation of the Wabanaki Confederacy.

Silently they sat for seven days. Everyday, no one spoke. That was called, "The Wigwam is Silent." Every councilor had to think about what he was going to say when they made the laws. All of them thought about how the fighting could be stopped. Next they opened up the wigwam. It was now called "Every One of Them Talks." And during that time they began their council....When all had finished talking, they decided to make a great fence; and in addition they put in the center a great wigwam within the fence; and also they made a whip and placed it with their father. Then whoever disobeyed him would be whipped. Whichever of his children was within the fence - all of them had to obey him. And he always had to kindle their great fire, so that it would not burn out. This is where the Wampum Laws originated. That fence was the confederacy agreement....There would be no arguing with one another again. They had to live like brothers and sisters who had the same parent....And their parent, he was the great chief at Caughnawaga. And the fence and the whip were the Wampum Laws. Whoever disobeyed them, the tribes together had to watch him.

== Governance ==
The Wabanaki Confederacy were governed by a council of elected sakoms, tribal leaders who were frequently also the governors of the drainage basin their village was built on. Sakoms themselves were more of respected listeners and debaters than simply rulers.

Wabanaki politics was fundamentally rooted on reaching a consensus on issues, often after much debate. Sakoms frequently used stylized metaphorical speech at council fires, trying to win over other sakoms. Sakoms who were skilled at debate often became quite influential in the Confederacy, often being older men who were called nebáulinowak or "riddle men."

"They have reproached me a hundred times because we fear our Captains, while they laugh at and make sport of theirs. All the authority of their chief is in his tongue's end; for he is powerful in so far as he is eloquent; and even if he kills himself talking and haranguing he will not be obeyed unless he please the [Indians]."

Wabanaki sakoms held regular conventions at their various "council fires" (seats of government) whenever there was a need to call each other together. In a council fire, they would sit in a large rectangle with all members facing each other. Each sakom member would have a chance to speak and be listened to, with the understanding that they would do the same for the others. Each tribe a sakom was part of also had a "kinship" status, being that they are brothers some members were older and younger. The lack of a single centralized capital complemented the Wabanaki government style, as sakoms were able to shift their political influence to any part of the nation that needed it. This could mean bringing leadership near or away from conflict zones. When a formal internal agreement was reached, not one but often at least five representatives speaking on behalf of their respective tribe and nation as a whole would set off to negotiate.

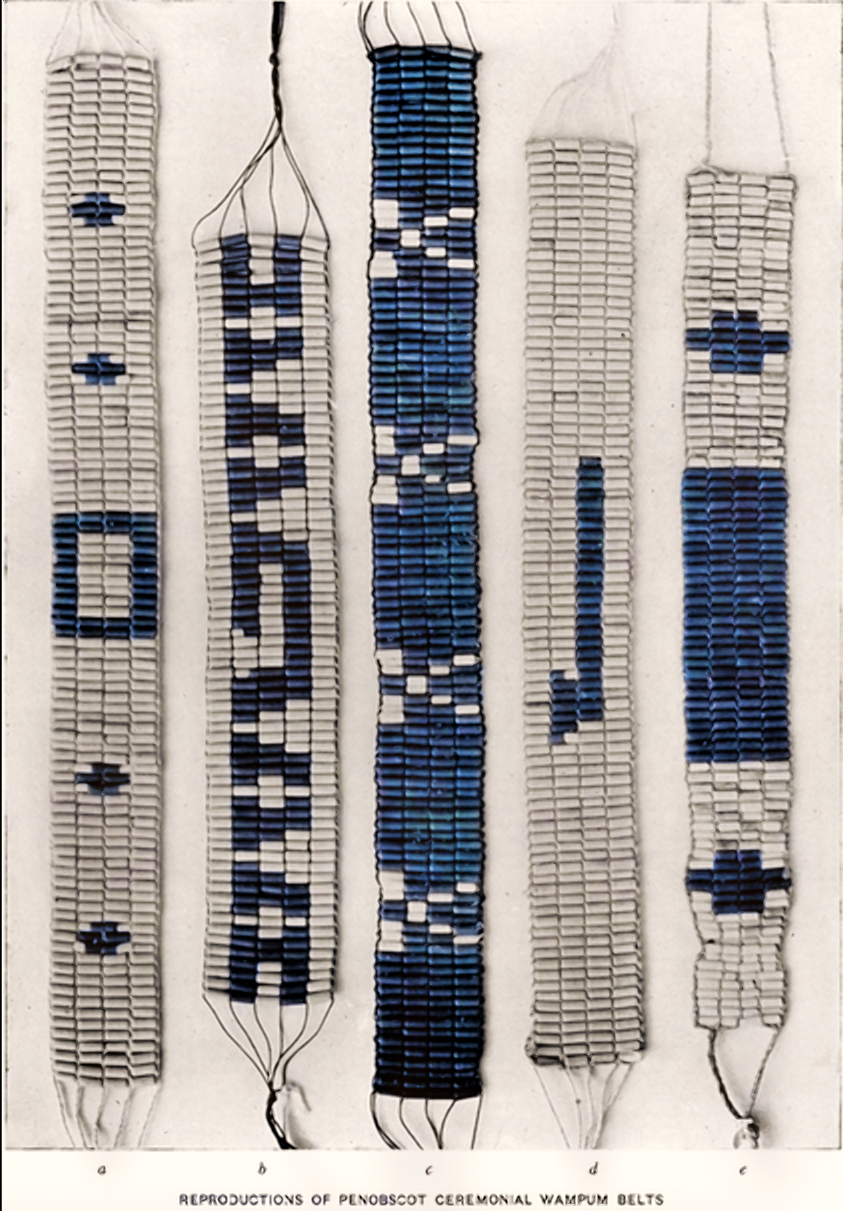
Colorized photo of 1915 reproductions of Wabanaki wampum belts that would have been used for political matters.

Probably influenced by diplomatic exchanges with Huron allies and Haudenosaunee enemies (especially since the 1640s), the Wabanaki began using wampum belts in their diplomacy in the course of the 17th century, when envoys took such belts to send messages to allied tribes in the confederacy. Wampum belts called gelusewa'ngan, meaning "speech", played an important role in maintaining Wabanaki political institutions. One of the last keepers of the "Wampum Record" and one of the last Wabanaki/Passamaquoddy delegates to go to Caughnawaga was Sepiel Selmo. Keepers of the wampum record were called putuwosuwin which involved a mix of oral history with understanding the context behind the placement of wampum on the belts.

Wampum shells arranged on strings in such a manner, that certain combinations suggested certain sentences or certain ideas to the narrator, who, of course, knew his record by heart and was merely aided by the association of the shell combinations in his mind with incidents of the tale or record which he was rendering.

What was not recorded through wampum was remembered in a long chain of oral record-keeping which village elders were in charge of, with multiple elders being able to double check each other. In the 1726 treaty following Dummer's War, the Wabanaki had to challenge a claim that land was sold to English settlers, of which not a single elder had a memory. After much challenge with New England Lt. Governor William Dummer, Wabanaki leadership was very careful and took their time to make sure there was as little misunderstanding of the terms of the land and peace as possible. The terms were worked out little by little each day, from August 1 through 5th. When an impasse was found, leadership would withdraw to talk about the matter thoroughly among themselves before reconvening to debate once more, with all representatives debating on the same page, with their most well thought-out arguments.

The Wabanaki never had a formal "grandchief" or single leader of the whole confederacy, and thus never had a single seat of government. Though Madockawando was treated as such in the Treaty of Casco, and his descendants such as Wabanaki Lieutenant Governor John Neptune would maintain an elevated status in the confederacy, both officially had the same amount of power as any other sakom. This would continue throughout the entire history of the Wabanaki, as the confederacy remained decentralized so as to never give more power to any of the member tribes. This meant that all major decisions had to be thoroughly debated by sakoms at council fires, which created a strong political culture empowering the best debaters.

The four/fourteen tribes were not completely independent from each other. Not only was it possible for sanctions to be placed on each other for creating problems, but also when a sakom died, newly elected sakoms would be confirmed by allied Wabanaki tribes who would visit following a year of mourning in the village. An event to appoint a new sakom, known as a Nská'wehadin or "assembly", could last several weeks. Tribes had a lot of autonomy, but they built a culture which normalized being involved in each other's political affairs to help maintain unity and cooperation. This event would continue until 1861 when the last Nská'wehadin was held in Old Town, Maine, shortly before the end of the confederacy. Occasionally some sakoms were known to ignore the will of the confederacy, most often the case for tribes on the border of European powers who had the most to lose during peace after war. Gray Lock, who was among the most successful wartime Wabanaki sakoms, refused to make peace after the 1722–1726 Dummer's War, given that his Vermont lands were being settled by English colonists. He would hold a successful guerrilla war for the following two decades, never being caught, and successfully deterring settlers entering his lands.

Kinship metaphors like "Brother", "Father", or "Uncle" in their original linguistic context were much more complex than when they were when translated into English or French. Such terms were used to understand the status and role of a diplomatic relationship. For instance, for the other tribes in the Wabanaki the Penobscot were called the ksés'i'zena or "our elder brother". The Passamaquoddy, Wolastoqiyik, and Mi'kmaq in this order of "age" were called ndo'kani'mi'zena or "our younger brother". The Wolastoqiyik referred to the Penobscot and Passamaquoddy as ksés'i'zena and the Mi'kmaq as ndo'kani'mi'zena. Concepts like this were also found in other confederacies like the Haudenosaunee. In the Wabanaki context, such terms indicated concepts like the Penobscot looking out for the well-being of the younger brothers, while younger brothers would support and respect the wisdom of an older brother. The idea of being related helped establish unity and cooperation in Wabanaki culture, using family as a metaphor to overcome factionalism and to quell internal conflicts like a family would. The age rank was based on the tribes proximity to the Caughnawaga Council, with the Penobscots being the closest. Before the massacre of the Norridgewock and the slow abandonment of their settlements and integration into their neighbor tribes, they were once seen as an older brother to the Penobscot.

This system was not seen as something indicating superiority per se, but rather a way to perceive a relationship in a manner that reflected the cultural norms of the Wabanaki. When the Wabanaki called the French Canadian governor and King of France "our father", it was a relationship built upon a sense of respect and protective care that reflected a Wabanaki father-son relationship. This was not well understood by diplomats from France and England who did not live with the peoples, seeing such terms as acknowledgment of subservience. Miscommunication over these terms was one of the biggest challenges in Wabanaki and European diplomacy. The culture and government style of Wabanaki would strongly push for a clear and mutual understanding of political matters, both internally and externally.

The Wabanaki saw and called the Ottawa "our father" for both their role as a leader in the Caughnawaga Council and in being a tribe that helped found Wabanaki and issued binding judgments that help maintain order. This did not mean the Wabanaki ever saw themselves as subservient to the Ottawa in any way, this was the same with the French. The Ottawa were largely seen as a form of third party political oversight.

== Military ==
Miꞌkmaꞌki: Divided into seven districts. Not shown is Taqamgug/Tagamuk, the eighth district that includes the entire island of Newfoundland.

Map of the campaigns during King William's War.

Members of the Wabanaki Confederacy were the:

- (Eastern) Abenaki or Panuwapskek (Penobscot)
- (Western) Abenaki
- Míkmaq (Mi'kmaq, L'nu)
- Peskotomuhkati (Passamaquoddy)
- Wolastoqiyik (Maliseet or Malicite)

Nations in the Confederacy also allied with the Innu of Nitassinan, the Algonquin people and with the Iroquoian-speaking Wyandot people. The homeland of the Wabanaki Confederacy stretches from Newfoundland, Canada, to Massachusetts, United States. Members of the Wabanaki Confederacy participated in these seven major wars:

- King Phillip's War (1675–1678)
- King William's War (1688–1697)
- Queen Anne's War (1702–1713)
- Dummer's War (1722–1725)
- King George's War (1744–1748)
- Father Le Loutre's War (1749–1755)
- French and Indian War (1754–1763)

During this period, their population was radically decimated due to many decades of warfare, but also because of famines and devastating epidemics of infectious disease. The number of European settlers increased from about 300 in 1650 to about 6,650 in 1750. European diseases such as smallpox and measles were introduced.

== British military campaign against New France ==
The Mi'kmaq were among the first tribes to establish trade with European settlers and helped to establish a barter system along the coast. Settlers and natives communicated in a language that mixed French and Mikmawisimk. The Mi'kmaq traded beaver, otter, marten, seal, moose, and deer furs with European settlers. The French missionary Chrestien Le Clercq complained that "they ridicule and laugh at the most sumptuous and magnificent of our buildings".

In 1711, the Acadians joined the Wabanaki Confederacy, when Fort Anne was besieged. The British proceeded to raid the coastal settlements, demanding an oath of allegiance from the Acadians. When British settlers encroached on the territory of the Abenaki, Penobscot, and the Passamaquoddy, these First Nations joined the Wolastoqiyik and the Mi'kmaq in the Wabanaki Confederacy. In 1715, the Mi'kmaq attacked fishing vessels off Sable Island. The Mi'kmaq declared "the Lands are [ours] and [we] can make War and peace when [we] please". The Wabanaki Confederacy did not fight under the leadership of a commander, but nevertheless implemented a strategy that was aimed to clear their land of intruders. Between 1722 and 1724, the Penobscot attacked Fort St. George four times, the Wabanaki attacked British colonial settlements along Kennebec River, while western Maine was attacked by the Pigwacket and the Ammoscocongon. The Wabanaki Confederacy destroyed the Brunswick settlement as well as other British colonial settlements on the banks of the Androscoggin River.

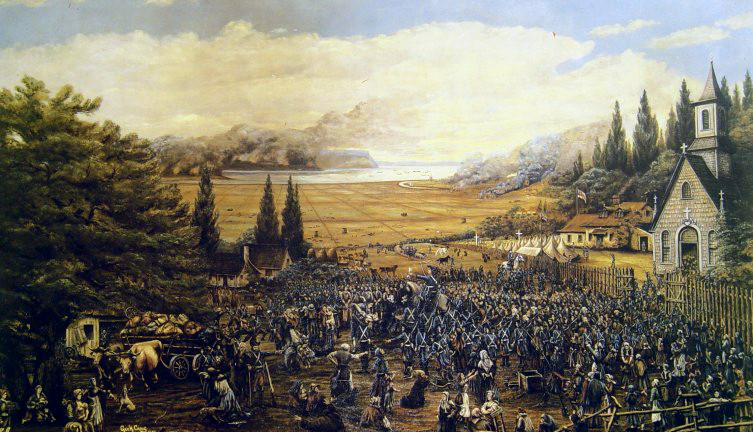
Deportation of the Acadians, Grand-Pré.

Prior to the Expulsion of the Acadians (1755–1764), the Acadians living in Nova Scotia largely refused to swear allegiance to the British Crown. When the Acadians in 1755 again refused to swear allegiance to the Crown, about 12,000 were deported to British North America, France and Louisiana. Quebec was taken by the British in 1759 and the French government effectively lost all influence in North America.

== British rule ==
The French were defeated by the British in 1763. The British colonial authorities marginalised Indigenous people as a matter of policy, because the Mi'kmaq had supported the French. 13,000 Acadian settlers were evicted by the British and the land was occupied by settlers from New England, Britain, and other European countries, including Ireland and Germany.

After 1783 and the end of the American Revolutionary War, Black Loyalists, freedmen from the British North American colonies, were resettled by the British in this historical territory. They had promised enslaved people freedom if they left their Patriot masters and joined the British. Three thousand freedmen were evacuated to Nova Scotia by British ships from the colonies after the war.

Oppressive policies instituted by successive colonial and federal administrations against the Acadians, Black Canadians, and Mi'kmaq people tended to force these peoples together as allies of necessity. The colonial government declared the Wabanaki Confederacy forcibly disbanded in 1862. However the five Wabanaki nations still exist, continued to meet, and the Confederacy was formally re-established in 1993.

== Contemporary revival ==
The Wabanaki Confederacy gathering was revived in 1993. The first reconstituted confederacy conference in contemporary time was developed and proposed by Claude Aubin and Beaver Paul and hosted by the Mi'kmaq community of Listuguj under the leadership of Chief Brenda Gideon Miller. The sacred Council Fire was lit again, and embers from the fire have been kept burning continually since then. The revival of the Wabanaki Confederacy brought together the Passamaquoddy Nation, Penobscot Nation, Wolastoqey Nation, and the Mi'kmaq Nation. Following the 2010 Declaration on the Rights of Indigenous Peoples (UNDRIP), the member nations began to re-assert their treaty rights, and the Wabanaki leadership emphasized the continuing role of the Confederacy in protecting natural capital.

There were meetings amongst allies, a "Water Convergence Ceremony" in May 2013, with Algonquin grandmothers in August 2013 supported by Kairos Canada, and with other Indigenous groups.

Alma Brooks represented the Confederacy at the June 2014 United Nations Permanent Forum on Indigenous Issues. She discussed the Wabanaki/Wolostoq position on the Energy East pipeline. Opposition to its construction has been a catalyst for organizing:

"On May 30 [2015], residents of Saint John will join others in Atlantic Canada, including Indigenous people from the Wolastoqiyik (Maliseet), Passamaquoddy and Mi'kmaq, to march to the end of the proposed pipeline and draw a line in the sand." This was widely publicized.

=== 2015 Grandmothers' Declaration ===
These and other preparatory meetings set an agenda for the August 19–22, 2015, meeting which produced the promised Grandmothers' Declaration "adopted unanimously at N'dakinna (Shelburne, Vermont) on August 21, 2015". The Declaration included mention of:

- Revitalization and maintenance of Indigenous languages
- Article 25 of the United Nations Declaration on the Rights of Indigenous Peoples (UNDRIP) on land, food, and water
- A commitment to "establish decolonized maps"
- The Wingspread Statement on the Precautionary Principles
- Obligation of governments to "obtain free, prior, and informed consent" before "further infringement"
- A commitment to "strive to unite the Indigenous Peoples; from coast to coast", e.g. against Tar Sands.
- Protecting food, "seeds, waters, and lands, from chemical and genetic contamination"
- Recognizes and confirms the unique decision-making structures of the Wabanaki Peoples in accordance with Article 18 of the UNDRIP Indigenous decision-making institutions:
  - "Our vision is to construct a Lodge, which will serve as a living constitution and decision-making structure for the Wabanaki Confederacy."
- Recognizes the Western Abenaki living in Vermont and the United States as a "People" and member nation
- Peace and friendship with "the Seven Nations of Iroquois"

=== Position on ecological and health issues ===
On October 15, 2015, Alma Brooks spoke to the New Brunswick Hydrofracturing Commission, applying the Declaration to current provincial industrial practices:

- She criticized the "industry of hydro-fracturing for natural gas in our territory" because "our people have not been adequately consulted ... have been abused and punished for taking a stand," and cited traditional knowledge of floods, quakes and salt lakes in New Brunswick;
- Criticized Irving Forestry Companies for having "clear cut our forests [and] spraying poisonous carcinogenic herbicides such as glyphosate all over 'our land', to kill hardwood trees, and other green vegetation," harming human and animal health;
- Noted "Streams, brooks, and creeks are drying up; causing the dwindling of Atlantic salmon and trout. Places where our people gather medicines, hunt deer, and moose are being contaminated with poison. We were not warned about the use of these dangerous herbicides, but since then cancer rates have been on the rise in Maliseet Communities; especially breast cancer in women and younger people are dying from cancer."
- Open pit mining "for tungsten and molybdenum [which] require tailing ponds; this one designated to be the largest in the world [which] definitely will seep out into the environment. A spill or leak from the Sisson Brook open-pit mine will permanently contaminate the Nashwaak River; which is a tributary of the Wolastok (Saint John River) and surrounding waterways. This is the only place left clean enough for the survival of the Atlantic salmon."
- "Oil pipelines and "refineries ... bent on contaminating and destroying the very last inch of (Wəlastokok) Maliseet territory."
- Rivers, lakes, streams, and lands.. contaminated "to the point that we are unable to gather our annual supply of fiddleheads [an edible fern], and medicines."
- The "duty to consult with aboriginal people ... has become a meaningless process,"..."therefore governments and/or companies do not have our consent to proceed with hydro-fracturing, open-pit mining, or the building of pipelines for gas and oil bitumen."

=== 2016 ===
The Passamaquoddy were to host the 2016 Wabanaki Confederacy Conference.

=== Ceremony at The Pines ===
Since the 1990s, members of The Penobscot nation and other members of the Wabanaki Confederacy gather at The Pines on Father Rasle Road in Madison, at the former Nanrantsouak village to remember and honor ancestors massacred by the British on August 22, 1724. A ceremony takes place and afterward a traditional Wabanaki meal of roasted corn, salmon, baked beans or moose stew is eaten. The tradition was begun by Barry Dana during an overnight sacred run. The ceremony began as a private Wabanaki remembrance but now the public is welcome to educate about this history.

== Culture ==
=== Basket art ===
Members of the Wabanaki Confederacy are recognized for their fine art basket making. Well-known Wabanaki basket makers Molly Neptune Parker, Clara Neptune Keezer, and Fred Tomah have been recognized for their art. Parker's grandchild Geo Soctomah Neptune is also a nationally recognized basket artist who is two-spirit and was featured in Vogue magazine in 2022 for their style and earring collection. Jeremy Frey received the Best in Class award in the Basketry category at the 2021 Santa Fe Indian Market, and went on to receive the 2024 Rapaport Prize and a 2025 MacArthur Fellowship for basketweaving.

=== Traditional healing ===
Traditional Wabanaki healing has been practiced for thousands of years. The Healing Lodge in Millinocket supplies intense outpatient treatment using traditional healing for tribal members suffering from substance use disorder, trauma, and mental health struggles. The Healing Lodge is operated by Wabanaki Public Health & Wellness. In 2024, The Mi'kmaq Nation used $50,000 of its national opioid settlement funds to build a Healing Lodge located in Presque Isle for use in traditional sweat ceremonies.

=== Cuisine ===
Wabanaki cuisine, like other Indigenous cuisine, is based on what can be grown and hunted locally. Corn, beans, squash, fresh-water fish, salt-water fish, moose, and white-tailed deer are common foods. Maple syrup, wild blueberries, ground cherries, ground nuts, and sunchokes are also incorporated into many dishes. Wabanaki people traditionally made milks, butters, and infant formula from walnuts, cornmeal, and sunflower seeds for centuries before colonizers arrived.

Wabanaki dishes include roasted parched sweet corn, hickorynut and hull corn salad, roasted groundnuts, cranberry sauce, grilled whitefish, Abenaki rose cornmeal pudding, pemmican made from ground fruits, nuts, and berries, Three Sisters soup, dandelion greens, fiddlehead salad, creamy sorrel and fiddlehead soup, clams with sunchokes, miwikisoak stew, hazelnut cakes, salmon burgers, and maple syrup pie.

== In Indigenous languages ==
Language	"Easterner(s)" literally "Dawn Person(s)"	"Dawn Land" (nominative)	"Dawn Land" (locative)	"Dawn Land Person"	"Dawn Land People" or the "Wabanaki Confederacy"
Naskapi		Waapinuuhch			
Massachusett language	Wôpanâ(ak)				
Quiripi language	Wampano(ak)	Wampanoki			
Miꞌkmaq	Wapnaꞌk(ik)	Wapnaꞌk	Wapnaꞌkik	Wapnaꞌki	Wapnaꞌkiyik
Maliseet-Passamaquoddy	Waponu(wok)	Waponahk	Waponahkik	Waponahkew	sing.: Waponahkiyik plur.: Waponahkewiyik
Abenaki-Penobscot	Wôbanu(ok)	Wôbanak	Wôbanakik	Wôbanaki	Wôbanakiak
Algonquin	Wàbano(wak)	Wàbanaki	Wàbanakìng	Wàbanakì	Wàbanakìk
Ojibwe	Waabano(wag)	Waabanaki	Waabanakiing	Waabanakii	Waabanakiig/Waabanakiiyag
Odawa	Waabno(wag)	Waabnaki	Waabnakiing	Waabnakii	Waabnakiig/Waabnakiiyag
Potawatomi	Wabno(weg)	Wabneki	Wabnekig	Wabneki	Wabnekiyeg

== Maps ==
Maps showing the approximate locations of areas occupied by members of the Wabanaki Confederacy (from north to south):

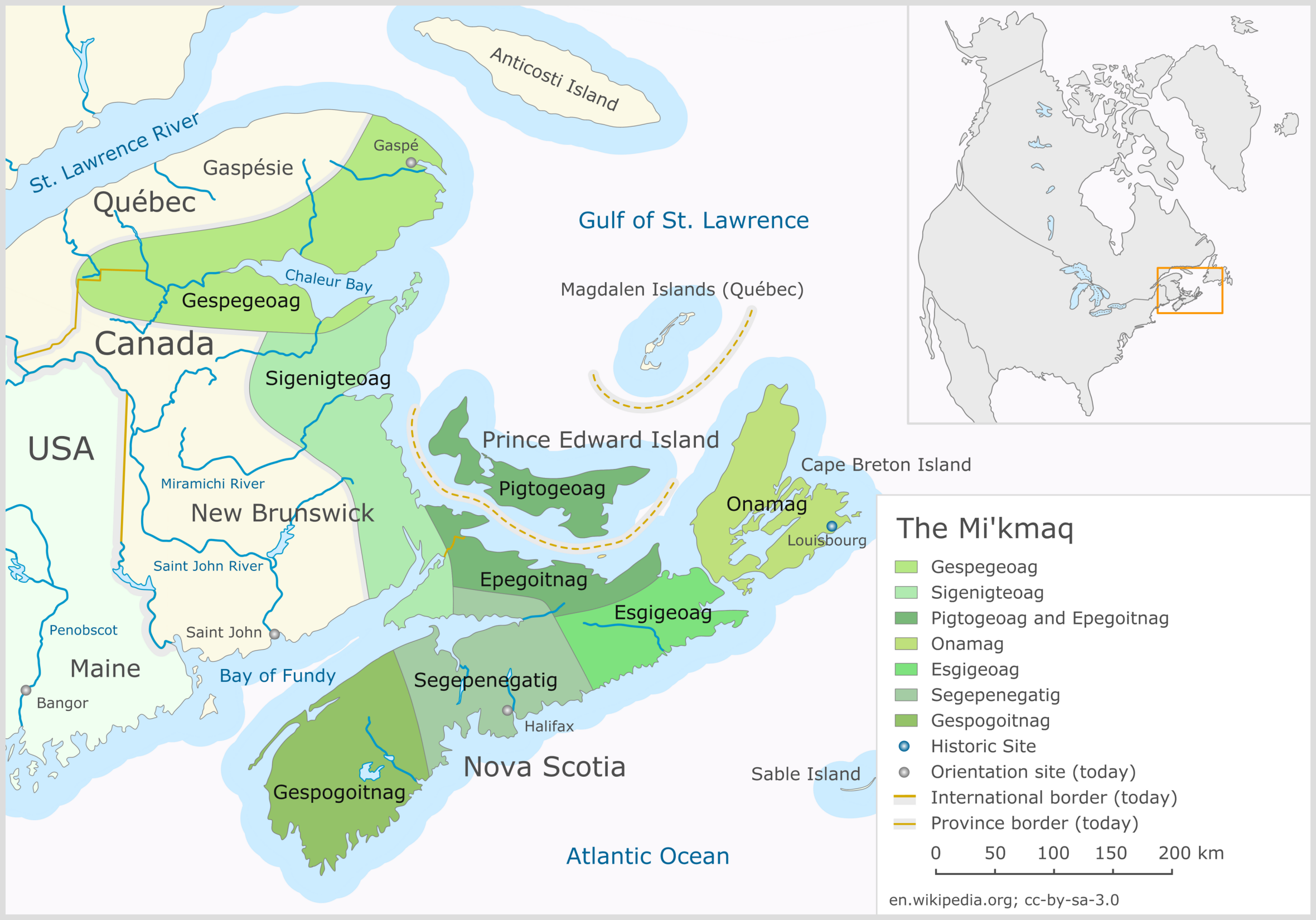
Mi'kmaq

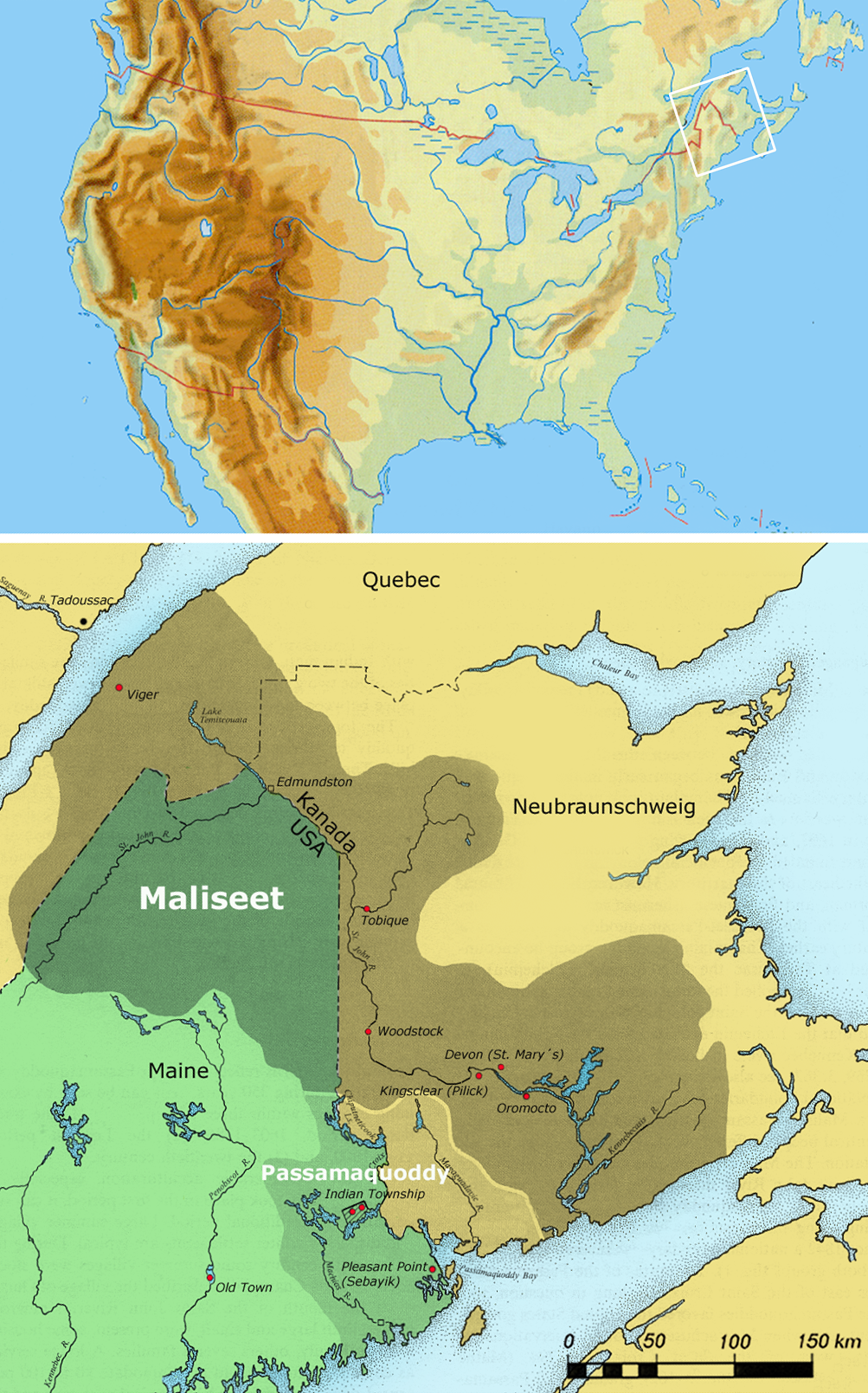
Wolastoqiyik, Passamaquoddy

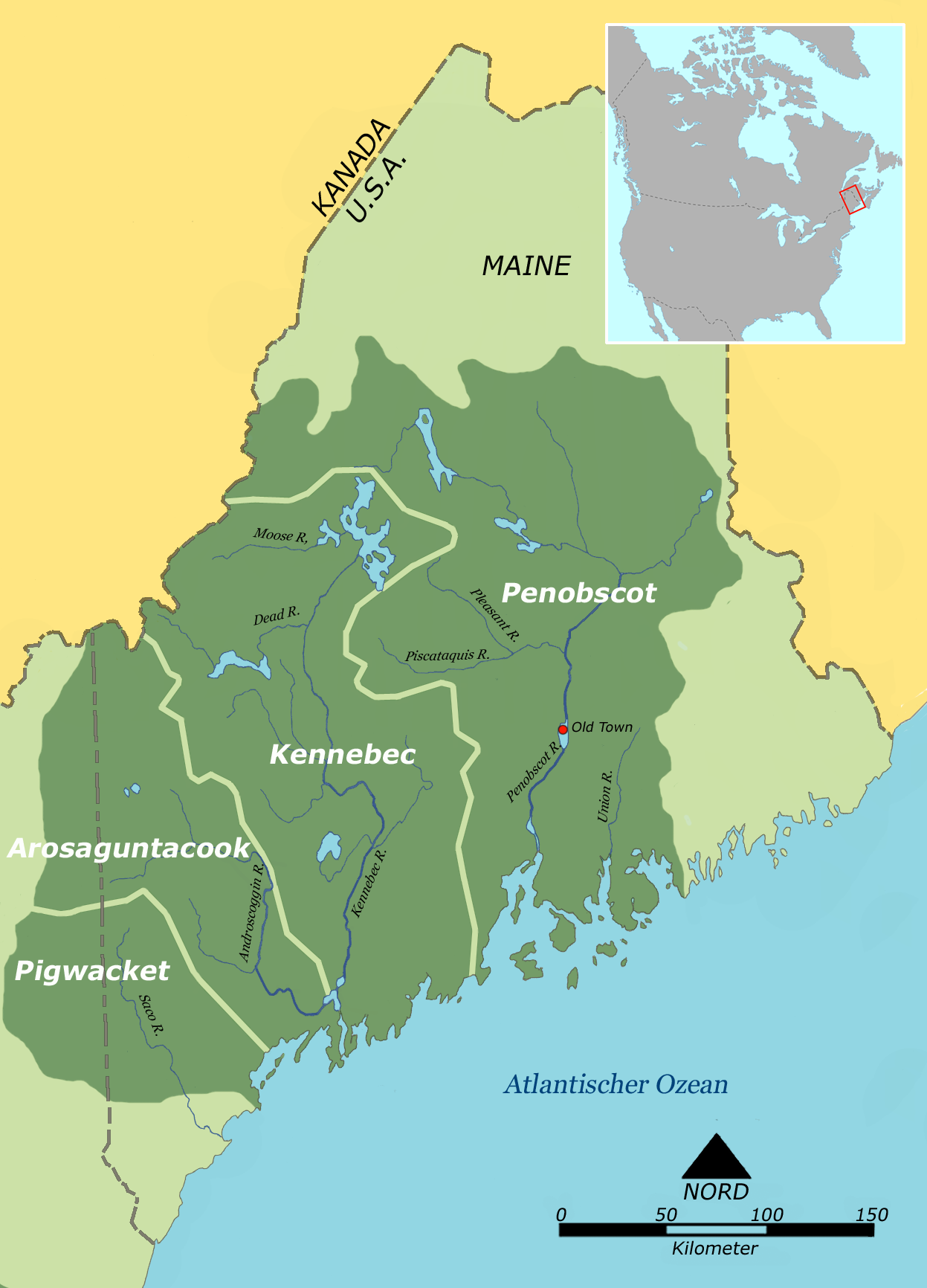
Eastern Abenaki (Penobscot, Kennebec, Arosaguntacook, Pigwacket/Pequawket)

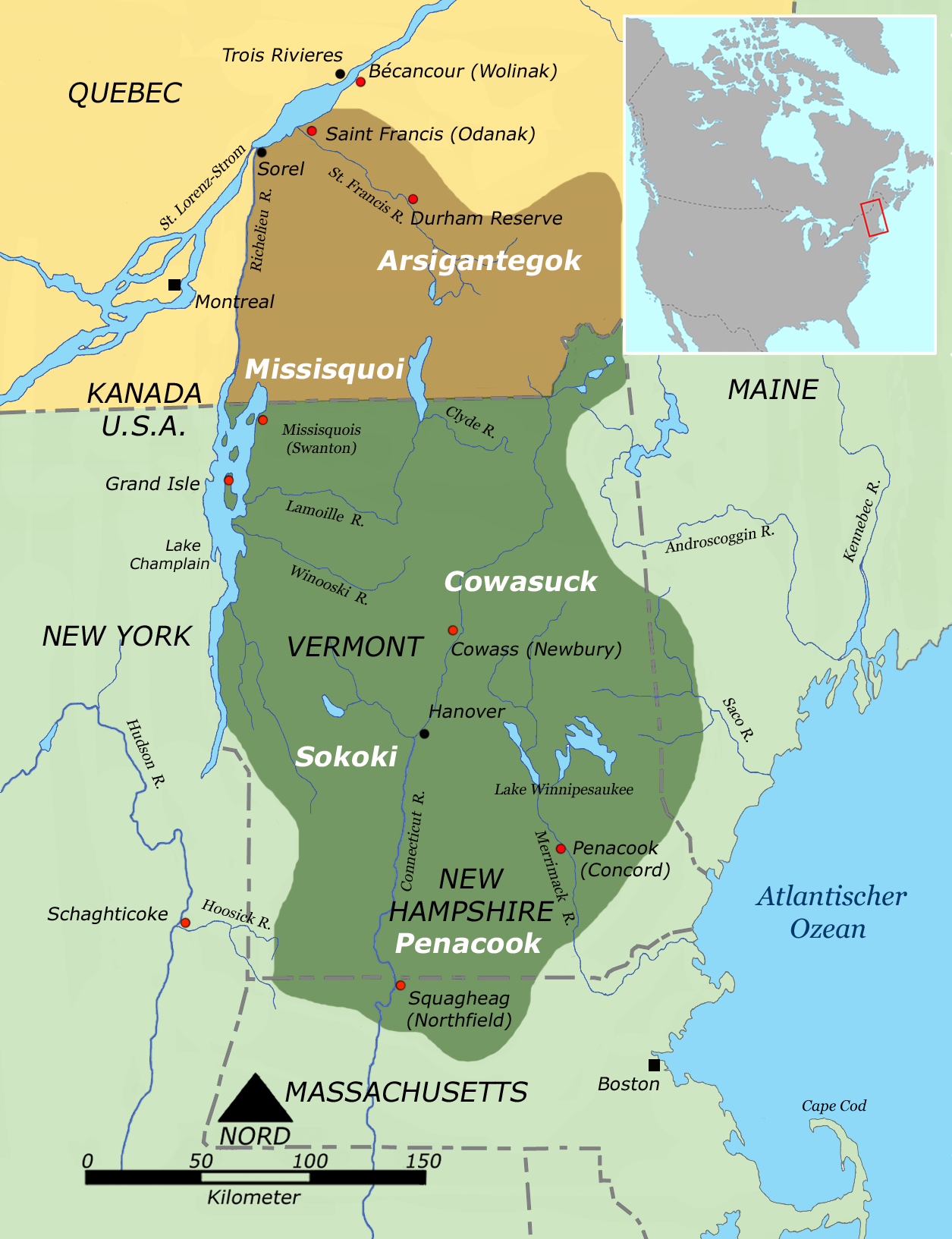
Western Abenaki (Arsigantegok, Missiquoi, Cowasuck, Sokoki, Pennacook)

== In popular culture ==
The Wabanaki Confederacy is featured in the video game Secret World: Legends (formerly The Secret World) via several NPCs who inform the player of the alternate history of the Confederacy and its relations with different groups, offer quests, provide items via Apothecaries, and are usually residing in locations that depict Wabanaki Confederacy culture.

== See also ==
- Haudenosaunee Confederacy (Iroquois)
