= Bear Pond (Hancock County, Maine) =

Lake in Hancock County, Maine, United States

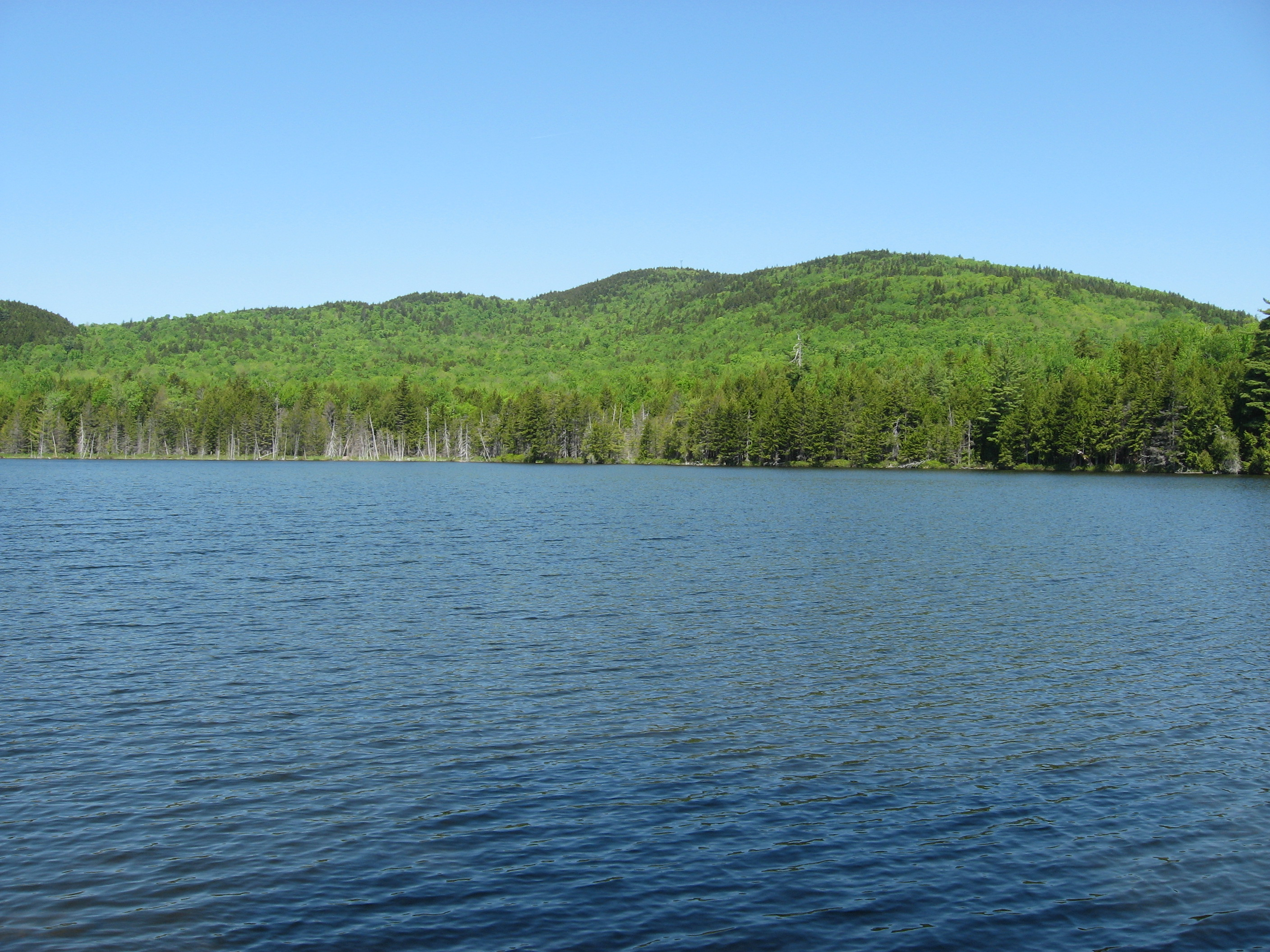
- Bear Pond and Lead Mountain

- Location within Maine Location within the United States
- Location: Hancock County, Maine, United States
- Coordinates: 44°51′14″N 68°05′31″W
- Lake type: Glacial
- Primary inflows: Bear Brook
- Primary outflows: Little Narraguagus River to Narraguagus River
- Basin countries: United States
- Max. length: 2,200 ft (670 m)
- Max. width: 950 ft (290 m)
- Surface elevation: 560 ft (170 m)

Bear Pond is a lake in Hancock County, Maine, United States. It is located less than 0.5 miles (0.80 km) west of the Washington County border, approximately 1 mi (1.6 km) southeast of the summit of Lead Mountain, and 1.2 mi (1.9 km) northwest of Maine State Route 9 near the town of Beddington. The inflow to Bear Pond comes primarily from Bear Brook, which drains the southeastern slopes of Lead Mountain, which comprises primarily the Bear Brook Watershed in Maine (BBWM), an experimental forest. There are two USGS stream gauges on the East and West Branches of Bear Brook. An unpaved road provides access to the BBWM from state route 9 and passes about 200 feet (61 m) from the eastern end of the pond. Bear Pond is surrounded by forest and is drained at its western end by the Little Narraguagus River.
