= Maine State Route 193 =

State highway in Maine, US

State Route 193

Route information
- Maintained by MaineDOT
- Length: 19.08 mi (30.71 km)
- Existed: 1925–present

Major junctions
- South end: US 1 in Cherryfield
- North end: SR 9 near Beddington

Location
- Country: United States
- State: Maine
- Counties: Washington, Hancock

Highway system
- Maine State Highway System; Interstate; US; State; Auto trails; Lettered highways
← SR 192	→ SR 194

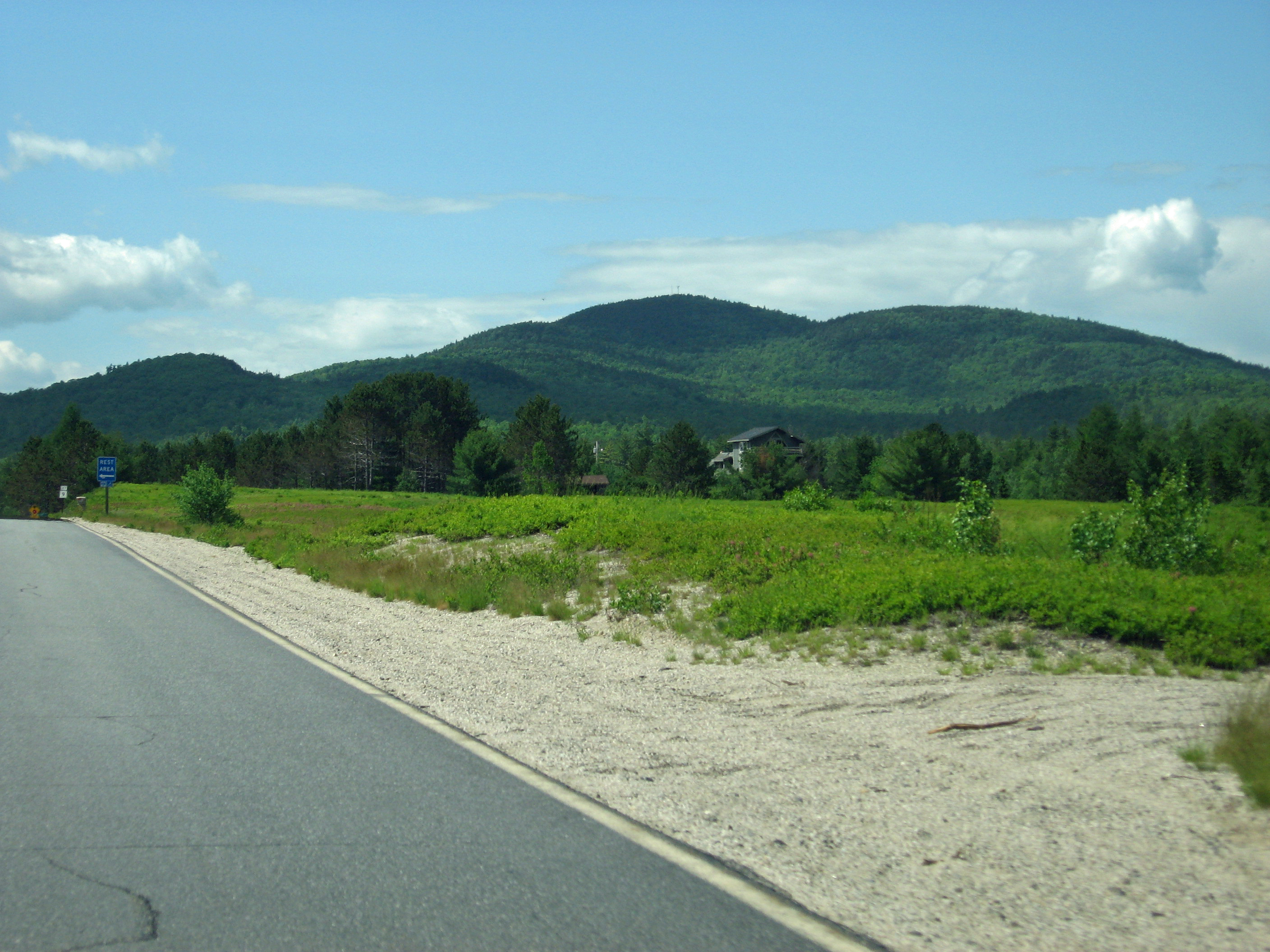
View of Lead Mountain from Route 193

State Route 193 (SR 193) is part of Maine's system of numbered state highways. It runs 19.08 miles (30.71 km) from an intersection at U.S. Route 1 (US 1) in Cherryfield to rural East Hancock, Hancock County at State Route 9 near Beddington. SR 193 originally ran between East Eddington and East Holden. The original route was renumbered SR 175, and 193 was moved to its current location. The new route originally ran closer to Beddington Lake, but the road was not suitable for heavy traffic, and a new connector to its current terminus was built in 1956. The northern terminus is just south of Lead Mountain.

== Major junctions ==
County	Location	mi	km	Destinations	Notes
Washington	Cherryfield	0.00	0.00	US 1 (Millbridge Road) / Main Street – Machias, Ellsworth	
Hancock	East Hancock	19.08	30.71	SR 9 – Aurora, Bangor, Beddington, Calais	
1.000 mi = 1.609 km; 1.000 km = 0.621 mi
