= Beddington Lake =

Lake in Maine, United States

- Location within Maine
- Location: Washington County, Maine, United States
- Coordinates: 44.82°N 68.05°W
- Lake type: Glacial
- Primary inflows: Narraguagus River
- Primary outflows: Narraguagus River
- Basin countries: United States
- Max. length: 2.2 mi (3.5 km)
- Max. width: 0.6 mi (0.97 km)
- Surface area: 404 acres (163 ha)
- Average depth: 19 ft (5.8 m)
- Max. depth: 59 ft (18 m)
- Water volume: 7,119 acre-foot (8,781,000 m^{3})
- Shore length^{1}: 11.4 mi (18.3 km)
- Surface elevation: 243 ft (74 m)
- Islands: 5+
- ^{1} Shore length is not a well-defined measure.

Beddington Lake is a lake in Washington County, Maine, United States. It is located less than 0.5 miles (0.80 km) east of the Hancock County border, near the town of Beddington and the intersection of Maine State Routes 9 and 193. The outflow and primary inflow to Beddington Lake is from the Narraguagus River. There are a number of unpaved roads and private residences surrounding the lake.
