= Little Narraguagus River =

Location
- Country: United States

Physical characteristics
- Source
  - location: Maine
- Mouth
  - location: Narraguagus River
  - coordinates: 44°50′02″N 68°04′05″W
  - elevation: 255 feet (80 m)
- Length: 3.3 mi (5.3 km)

The Little Narraguagus River is a short stream in Maine. From the outflow of Bear Pond (44°51′09″N 68°05′44″W) in Maine Township 28, MD, Hancock County, the river runs 3.3 miles (5.3 km) southeast and east to its confluence with the Narraguagus River in Beddington, Washington County.

== See also ==
- List of rivers of Maine
