= Woodland, Aroostook County, Maine =

Town in Maine, United States

Woodland, Maine
- Town
- Location in Aroostook County and the state of Maine
- Coordinates: 46°53′03″N 68°07′10″W
- Country: United States
- State: Maine
- County: Aroostook
- Villages: Woodland Center; Carson; Colby

Area
  - Total: 35.25 sq mi (91.30 km^{2})
  - Land: 35.25 sq mi (91.30 km^{2})
  - Water: 0 sq mi (0 km^{2})
- Elevation: 709 ft (216 m)

Population (2020)
  - Total: 1,217
  - Density: 34/sq mi (13.3/km^{2})
- Time zone: UTC-5 (Eastern (EST))
  - Summer (DST): UTC-4 (EDT)
- ZIP Code: 04736
- GNIS feature ID: 582826
- Website: woodlandto.com

Woodland is a town in Aroostook County, Maine, United States. The population was 1,217 at the 2020 census. Because the state of Maine has a law stating that no two towns may share the same name, Woodland of Aroostook County and Woodland of Washington County found themselves before the Maine Supreme Judicial Court in the late 1990s. Because it was founded as a township first, Woodland of Aroostook County was allowed to keep its name and Woodland of Washington County was ordered by the court to choose a new name: Baileyville.

Among the first white settlements in Woodland was the Moir Farm, which was still active as of 2020.

== Geography ==
According to the United States Census Bureau, the town has a total area of 35.25 square miles (91.30 km^{2}), all land.

== Demographics ==
Historical population
| Census | Pop. | Note | %± |
|---|---|---|---|
| 1870 | 174 | | — |
| 1880 | 679 | | 290.2% |
| 1890 | 885 | | 30.3% |
| 1900 | 1,096 | | 23.8% |
| 1910 | 1,161 | | 5.9% |
| 1920 | 1,120 | | −3.5% |
| 1930 | 1,308 | | 16.8% |
| 1940 | 1,298 | | −0.8% |
| 1950 | 1,292 | | −0.5% |
| 1960 | 1,372 | | 6.2% |
| 1970 | 1,218 | | −11.2% |
| 1980 | 1,369 | | 12.4% |
| 1990 | 1,402 | | 2.4% |
| 2000 | 1,403 | | 0.1% |
| 2010 | 1,213 | | −13.5% |
| 2020 | 1,217 | | 0.3% |
U.S. Decennial Census

=== 2010 census ===
As of the census of 2010, there were 1,213 people, 508 households, and 360 families living in the town. The population density was 34.4 inhabitants per square mile (13.3/km^{2}). There were 586 housing units at an average density of 16.6 per square mile (6.4/km^{2}). The racial makeup of the town was 97.6% White, 0.3% African American, 0.6% Native American, and 1.5% from two or more races. Hispanic or Latino of any race were 0.7% of the population.

There were 508 households, of which 27.6% had children under the age of 18 living with them, 56.9% were married couples living together, 7.1% had a female householder with no husband present, 6.9% had a male householder with no wife present, and 29.1% were non-families. 22.2% of all households were made up of individuals, and 9% had someone living alone who was 65 years of age or older. The average household size was 2.39 and the average family size was 2.77.

The median age in the town was 46.1 years. 19.7% of residents were under the age of 18; 6.3% were between the ages of 18 and 24; 22.6% were from 25 to 44; 35.9% were from 45 to 64; and 15.5% were 65 years of age or older. The gender makeup of the town was 50.5% male and 49.5% female.

=== 2000 census ===
As of the census of 2000, there were 1,403 people, 528 households, and 397 families living in the town. The population density was 39.8 inhabitants per square mile (15.4/km^{2}). There were 577 housing units at an average density of 16.4/sq mi (6.3/km^{2}). The racial makeup of the town was 96.01% White, 0.93% African American, 1.35% Native American, 1.00% Asian, and 0.71% from two or more races. Hispanic or Latino of any race were 0.78% of the population.

There were 528 households, out of which 34.1% had children under the age of 18 living with them, 61.6% were married couples living together, 7.4% had a female householder with no husband present, and 24.8% were non-families. 18.9% of all households were made up of individuals, and 8.9% had someone living alone who was 65 years of age or older. The average household size was 2.65 and the average family size was 3.03.

In the town, the population was spread out, with 25.9% under the age of 18, 6.4% from 18 to 24, 28.7% from 25 to 44, 27.9% from 45 to 64, and 11.1% who were 65 years of age or older. The median age was 39 years. For every 100 females, there were 110.7 males. For every 100 females age 18 and over, there were 103.9 males.

The median income for a household in the town was $28,929, and the median income for a family was $35,250. Males had a median income of $27,750 versus $21,500 for females. The per capita income for the town was $14,034. About 11.6% of families and 13.3% of the population were below the poverty line, including 17.5% of those under age 18 and 19.6% of those age 65 or over.
