= Codyville, Maine =

- Township
- Location within Maine Location within the United States
- Coordinates: 45°26′23″N 67°41′39″W
- Country: United States
- State: Maine
- County: Washington

Area
  - Total: 55 sq mi (142 km^{2})
  - Land: 55 sq mi (142 km^{2})
  - Water: 0.20 sq mi (0.52 km^{2})
- Elevation: 390 ft (120 m)

Population (2020)
  - Total: 13
  - Density: 0.24/sq mi (0.092/km^{2})
- Time zone: UTC-5 (Eastern (EST))
  - Summer (DST): UTC-4 (EDT)
- ZIP Codes: 04490 (Topsfield); 04413 (Brookton)
- Area code: 207
- FIPS code: 23-13610
- GNIS feature ID: 582413

Codyville is a township in Washington County, Maine, United States, that is part of the unorganized territory of North Washington. The population was 13 at the 2020 census. Codyville was formerly a plantation, but it de-organized in 2019.

== History ==
Codyville was named after its first settler and was organized as a plantation in 1872 from Robbins Township (Northern half) and Hingham Academy Grant (Southern Half). After sustaining a steady population decline since the 1930s, the plantation ultimately de-organized in 2019.

== Geography ==
According to the United States Census Bureau, the plantation has a total area of 55.0 square miles (142 km^{2}), of which 54.8 square miles (142 km^{2}) is land and 0.2 square miles (0.52 km^{2}), or 0.31%, is water.

== Demographics ==
Historical population
Census	Pop.	Note	%±
1860	63		—
1870	62		−1.6%
1880	79		27.4%
1890	72		−8.9%
1900	68		−5.6%
1910	69		1.5%
1920	80		15.9%
1930	89		11.3%
1940	79		−11.2%
1950	62		−21.5%
1960	38		−38.7%
1970	45		18.4%
1980	43		−4.4%
1990	35		−18.6%
2000	19		−45.7%
2010	24		26.3%
2020	13		−45.8%
U.S. Decennial Census

As of the census of 2000, there were 19 people, 9 households, and 6 families residing in the plantation. The population density was 0.3 inhabitants per square mile (0.12/km^{2}). There were 25 housing units at an average density of 0.5 per square mile (0.19/km^{2}). The racial makeup of the plantation was 100.00% White.

There were 9 households, out of which 11.1% had children under the age of 18 living with them, 66.7% were married couples living together, and 33.3% were non-families. 33.3% of all households were made up of individuals, and 33.3% had someone living alone who was 65 years of age or older. The average household size was 2.11 and the average family size was 2.67.

In the plantation the population was spread out, with 5.3% under the age of 18, 10.5% from 18 to 24, 21.1% from 25 to 44, 47.4% from 45 to 64, and 15.8% who were 65 years of age or older. The median age was 50 years. For every 100 females, there were 90.0 males. For every 100 females age 18 and over, there were 100.0 males.

The median income for a household in the plantation was $68,750, and the median income for a family was $85,139. Males had a median income of $55,417 versus $21,250 for females. The per capita income for the plantation was $21,295. None of the population and none of the families were below the poverty line.

== Education ==
The Maine Department of Education takes responsibility for coordinating school assignments in the unorganized territory. As of 2025 it assigned Codyville to the following schools of Alternative Organization System 90: East Range II CSD School in Topsfield (K-8 school) and Woodland High School.

Codyville received a school in 1870. It was part of School Union 107 until July 1972 and then joined School Union 108. In 1974 it was to join the East Range II Community School District. When Codyville was to be de-organized, it was to leave the district.
