= Upper Lead Mountain Pond =

Lake in the US state of Maine

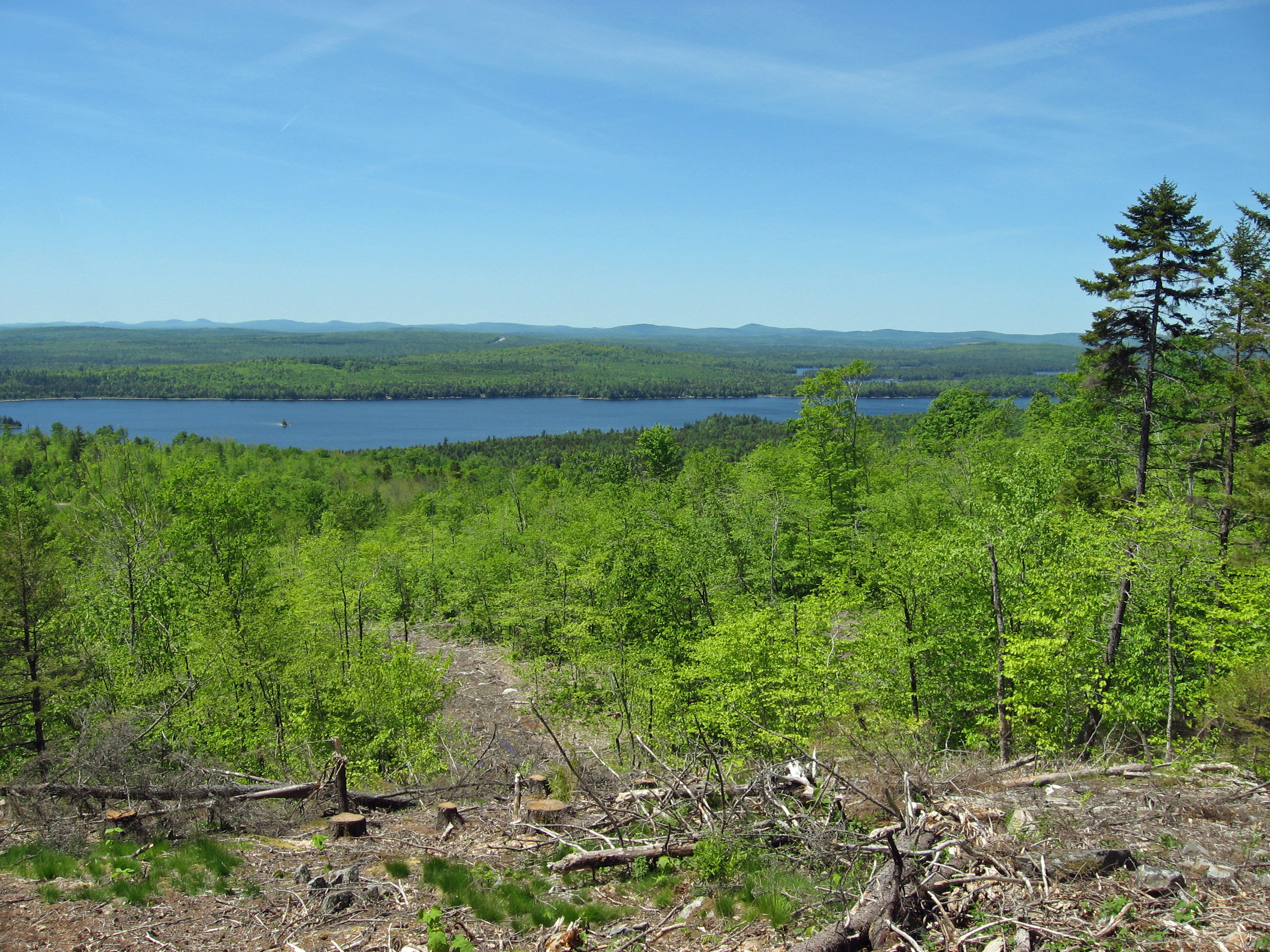
- Upper Lead Mountain Pond from the east

- Location within Maine Location within the United States
- Location: Hancock County, Maine, United States
- Coordinates: 44.851848°N 68.140843°W
- Lake type: Glacial
- Primary inflows: Meadow Brook and others
- Primary outflows: Unnamed stream to Middle/Lower Lead Mountain Pond
- Basin countries: United States
- Max. length: 2.6 mi (4.2 km)
- Max. width: 1.0 mi (1.6 km)
- Surface area: 977 acres (395 ha)
- Max. depth: 57 ft (17 m)
- Water volume: 24,970 acre-feet (30.80×10^{6} m^{3})
- Surface elevation: 350 ft (110 m)
- Islands: 2+

Upper Lead Mountain Pond is a lake in Hancock County, Maine, United States. It is located less than 1.5 miles (2.4 km) west of the Lead Mountain and 0.25 mi (0.40 km) north of Maine State Route 9 near the town of Beddington. The inflow to Bear Pond comes from several small stream, and it drains via a small 500 feet (150 m) stream to Middle/Lower Lead Mountain Pond. Several unpaved roads provide access to the lake and private residences surrounding it. The Lake is surrounded by forest and supports several fish, including landlocked Atlantic salmon, brook trout, white perch, yellow perch, and chain pickerel.
