= Maine State Route 192 =

State highway in Washington County, Maine, US

State Route 192

Route information
- Maintained by MaineDOT
- Length: 20.25 mi (32.59 km)
- Existed: 1925–present

Major junctions
- South end: US 1 in Machias
- North end: SR 9 in Wesley

Location
- Country: United States
- State: Maine
- Counties: Washington

Highway system
- Maine State Highway System; Interstate; US; State; Auto trails; Lettered highways
← SR 191	→ SR 193

State Route 192 (SR 192) is part of Maine's system of numbered state highways. It runs 20 1/4 miles (32.6 km) from an intersection with U.S. Route 1 (US 1) in Machias to an intersection with SR 9 in Wesley. The route is also known as Northfield Road in Machias and Junior Williams Road in Wesley and has existed since 1925.

== Major junctions ==
The entire route is in Washington County.

Location	mi	km	Destinations	Notes
Machias	0.00	0.00	US 1 (Dublin Street / Main Street) – Calais, Ellsworth	
Machias	0.22	0.35	US 1A (Court Street) – Whiting, East Machias	Southbound one-way pair has a 0.06-mile (0.097 km) concurrency with US 1A
Wesley	20.25	32.59	SR 9 (Airline Road) – Crawford, Bangor	
1.000 mi = 1.609 km; 1.000 km = 0.621 mi
