= Tomah mayfly =

Scientific classification
- Kingdom: Animalia
- Phylum: Arthropoda
- Class: Insecta
- Order: Ephemeroptera
- Family: Siphlonuridae
- Genus: Siphlonisca
- Species: S. aerodromia

Binomial name
- Siphlonisca aerodromia Needham, 1909

Species of mayfly

Siphlonisca aerodromia, commonly known as the Tomah mayfly, is an extremely rare species and has only been documented less than 100 times. It was once thought to only known to occur in New York and Northern Maine, but has been since found more recently in eastern Canada as well. The Tomah mayfly is an endangered species and is listed as threatened in both New York (G1: critically imperiled conservation status) and Maine (G2: imperiled conservation status). Its abundance is unknown. The Tomah mayfly is the only species within the monotypic genus Siphlonisca. The Tomah mayfly is a habitat specialist and an indicator species. Adults only live for a few days as they deposit eggs into rivers and streams. Nymphs hatch from eggs and migrate to the floodplains during springtime and following snow melt. They spend most of their lives in the floodplains, feeding on other aquatic invertebrates in order to grow rapidly. The Tomah mayfly was considered as a flagship species and led to the decision not to dam a stream and flood a sedge meadow and therefore conserve the ecosystem.

== Discovery ==
Siphlonisca aerodromia was first collected by C.P. Alexander in 1907 from the Sacaganda River in northern New York. Alexander gave the specimens to Needham to describe the species in 1909. In 1915, Clemens first described the nymph stage of the species. In the 1930s, a dam was constructed in the same location in northern New York, eradicating the species from this area. The species was rediscovered in 1978 along the Tomah Stream in Codyville, Maine and, therefore, was named the Tomah mayfly. Most documented sightings of the species have been found in Maine, stretching from western, northern, central, and eastern Maine. Collections of the species have also been taken in Quebec and Labrador, Canada.

== Description ==
The Tomah mayfly is unusually large compared to other species of mayflies. Tomah mayflies measure up to 1 inch in length. Nymphs have greatly expanded, wing-like flanges on the abdomen and bumps on the thorax which distinguish the Tomah mayfly from other species of mayflies. Tomah mayfly nymphs and sub-adults feed predaceously on other invertebrates in the floodplains, which is unusual as other species of mayflies feed on dead plant material. Siphlonisca is a monotypic genus, meaning Siphlonisca aerodromia is the only species within this genus. The species is univoltine, meaning one generation is produced per year.

== Habitat and range ==
Siphlonisca aerodromia are confined to a range of approximately 5,000 to 20,000 square kilometers. They are locally common in restricted habitats. They have only been found in areas of New York, Maine, and eastern Canada. In Maine, they have only been found in 16 different sites. They require freshwater rivers, streams, or marshes, forested wetlands, boreal upland forest and/ or sedge-dominated floodplains that are seasonally flooded for survival. By the Canadian Maritime Provinces, populations of Tomah mayflies have been found in southeastern Quebec, south of the St. Lawrence River.

== Life history ==
The life history of the Tomah mayfly has been extensively studied. Tomah mayflies use the streams and rivers as refuge during the summer and winter, while they inhabit the floodplains during a short period of rapid growth during the spring. Therefore, the Tomah Mayfly is considered an example of river-floodplain fauna, using the stream as refuge during the dry period of the summer, and using the floodplain during period of growth and development during the spring. Females produce approximately 400 large eggs, less than other species of mayflies. Each egg is approximately 0.46mm long, which is larger than those of other species of mayflies. Females have the ability to reproduce parthenogenetically, as they do not require males to fertilize their eggs. Up to 92% of eggs from unmated females hatch. Nymphs produced parthenogenetically are identical copies of their mother. Eggs are deposited in the water column of streams or rivers where they attach to submerged sand and gravel substrates. The eggs have coiled fibers, allowing them to attach to the substrates on the bottom. Eggs hatch in December. Hatchlings are referred to as nymphs which are less than 1mm long when first hatched. Nymphs may get up to 19mm long. Nymphs feed on decomposing vegetation and algae in water temperatures of approximately 0°C. During the spring, when snow melts in March and April, nymphs migrate from the stream channel to the floodplains where they prey on other aquatic insects. The majority of larval growth occurs in the floodplains. The period of flooding is short between April and May. However, a rich macro-invertebrate community develops during this time, allowing Tomah mayfly nymphs to feed. Adults emerge sometime from late May to early June. Adult emergence is correlated to maximum air temperatures and persistence of standing water in the floodplain. Tomah mayflies live in the adult stage for only 1–9 days, as they mate and lay eggs. They do not feed in the adult stage.

The Tomah Mayfly is a natural prey of Brook Trout (Salvelinus fontinalis). The Tomah Mayfly tends to decrease its activity and movement when it detects chemicals released by Brook Trout feeding on conspecifics, or members of the same species.

== Conservation status ==
Siphlonisca aerodromia are threatened by several IUCN Level 1 and Level 2 Threats. Biological resource use such as logging and wood harvesting, natural systems modifications such as dams and water management-use, transportation and service corridors such as roads, railroads, and utility/ service lines, and lastly climate change and severe weather resulting in habitat shifting or alteration are all threatening to the conservation status of the Tomah mayfly.
