= Gardner Lake (Maine) =

Lake in Washington County, Maine

- Location within Maine Location within the United States
- Location: Washington County, Maine, United States
- Coordinates: 44°46′48″N 67°21′47″W
- Lake type: Natural freshwater lake
- Basin countries: United States
- Surface area: 3,720 acres (1,510 ha)
- Average depth: 40 ft (12 m)
- Max. depth: 56 ft (17 m)
- Surface elevation: 20 m (66 ft)

Gardner Lake is a body of water in Washington County, Maine. It is bordered by Whiting, East Machias and Marion Township. The lake has a surface area of 3,720 acres and a maximum depth of 56 feet.

On June 19, 1936, twelve schoolchildren from nearby Lubec, Maine, drowned in the lake after their boat capsized.
