= Moosehorn National Wildlife Refuge =

Protected area in Maine, United States

- IUCN category IV (habitat/species management area)
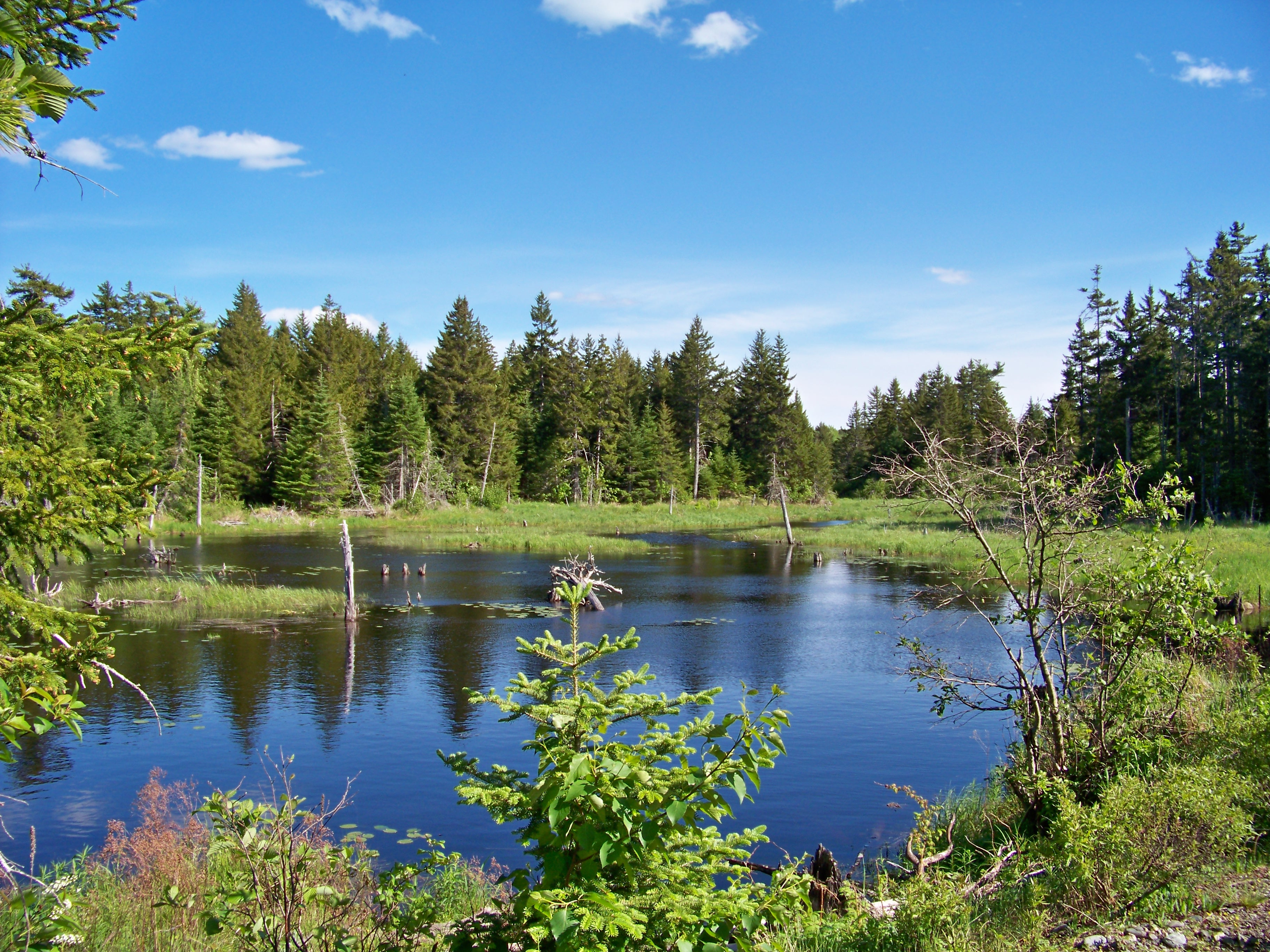
- Moosehorn National Wildlife Refuge

- Location within the United States
- Location: Washington County, Maine, United States
- Nearest city: Calais, Maine
- Coordinates: 45°02′00″N 67°17′58″W
- Area: 28,751 acres (116.35 km^{2})
- Established: 1937
- Governing body: U.S. Fish and Wildlife Service
- Website: Moosehorn National Wildlife Refuge

Moosehorn National Wildlife Refuge is one of the northernmost National Wildlife Refuges in the Atlantic Flyway, a migratory route that follows the eastern coast of North America. The refuge provides important feeding and nesting habitat for many bird species, including waterfowl, wading birds, shorebirds, upland game birds, songbirds, and birds of prey.

The refuge consists of two divisions. The Baring Division covers 20,016 acres (81.00 km^{2}) and is located off U.S. Route 1, southwest of Calais, Maine. The 8,735-acre (35.35 km^{2}) Edmunds Division is between Dennysville and Whiting on U.S. Route 1 and borders the tidal waters of Cobscook Bay. Each division contains a wilderness area, thousands of acres managed to preserve their wild character for future generation.

The East Coast Greenway, connecting Calais, Maine to Key West, Florida, runs through part of the refuge.

== Wildlife and habitat ==
The refuge's landscape is varied, with rolling hills, large ledge outcrops, streams, lakes, bogs, and marshes. A northern hardwood forest of aspen, maple, birch, spruce and fir dominates the upland. Scattered stands of majestic white pine are common. The Edmunds Division boasts several miles of rocky shoreline where tidal fluctuations of up to 24 feet (7.3 m) occur twice a day.

This habitat diversity supports many wildlife species. The staff at Moosehorn National Wildlife Refuge manages the land to protect the Service's "trust resources". which include migratory birds, endangered species, and wetlands. By improving habitat, the Service ensures that wildlife will thrive on the refuge.

Woodcock, black bear, ruffed grouse, lynx, beaver, red fox, river otter, gray fox, moose, bobcat, coyote, raccoon, mink, deer, and a variety of songbirds prosper only in a young forest. In the past, wildfires revitalized the forest, while farming maintained open areas. However, wildfire is a rare event today, and farmland acreage has decreased dramatically. Habitat management programs, including timber harvesting and controlled burning, mimic the effects of wildfire and farming by providing clearings and early growth forests.

Small clearcuts scattered throughout the forest provide openings and young, brushy growth that serve as food and cover for many wildlife species. Each year, the Service awards timber units to local harvesters according to the refuge forest management plan. The harvesters pay for the timber based on a fixed stumpage schedule. Much of this revenue is returned to the community in lieu of property taxes. This management has produced significant increases in woodcock, grouse, bear, and moose populations.

Approximately one third of the refuge is designated as federal wilderness. The two Wilderness Areas (one in each division) are part of the National Wilderness Preservation System. They are managed with a "hands-off" philosophy and granted special protection to maintain their primitive qualities. Internal combustion engines and mechanical means of transportation (i.e. bicycles) are not allowed. Habitat management is kept to a minimum to allow the areas to develop into old- growth climax forests.

Bald eagles frequent both divisions of the refuge, feeding on fish in the streams, ponds, and flowages. In recent years, as many as three pairs of eagles have nested at Moosehorn National Wildlife Refuge. Eagles are frequently sighted around Magurrewock Marsh on the Baring Division and along the shore of Dennys Bay on the Edmunds Division. Osprey nest in several of the refuge marshes with as many as four pairs using platforms along the Charlotte Road.

The woodlands are home to many songbirds, including neotropical migrants, species that breed in North America and winter in Mexico, the Caribbean, and Central and South America. In mid-May, a flush of migrating warblers fills the forest with song. Twenty-six species of these diminutive birds nest on the refuge. In addition, northern forest species, such as boreal chickadees and spruce grouse, are present.
