= Narraguagus River =

River in the United States of America

Location
- Country: United States

Physical characteristics
- Source
  - location: Maine
- Mouth
  - location: Narraguagus Bay
  - coordinates: 44°31′23″N 67°51′25″W
  - elevation: sea level
- Length: 55 mi (89 km)

Basin features
- Tributaries
  - right: W. Br. Narraguagus R. (T. 34); Little Narraguagus River; W. Br. Narraguagus (Wash. Co.)

The Narraguagus River (/ˌnæɹəˈɡweɪgəs/) is a river located in the U.S. state of Maine with its mouth in the Narraguagus Bay of the Gulf of Maine. It flows through the town of Cherryfield and was formerly well known for its sport fly fishing for Atlantic salmon. This was a traditional highlight of late spring with anglers gathering from afar for the Memorial Day weekend fishing kick-off. The native salmon run has been much reduced due to many different factors.

From the outlet of Eagle Lake (44°59′58″N 68°09′08″W) in Maine Township 34 MD, Hancock County, the river runs 55.3 miles (89.0 km) southeast to its mouth in Milbridge, Washington County. During its course, the river passes Lead Mountain before flowing into and out of Beddington Lake.

== See also ==
- List of Maine rivers
