= Waite, Maine =

Town in Maine, United States

- Town
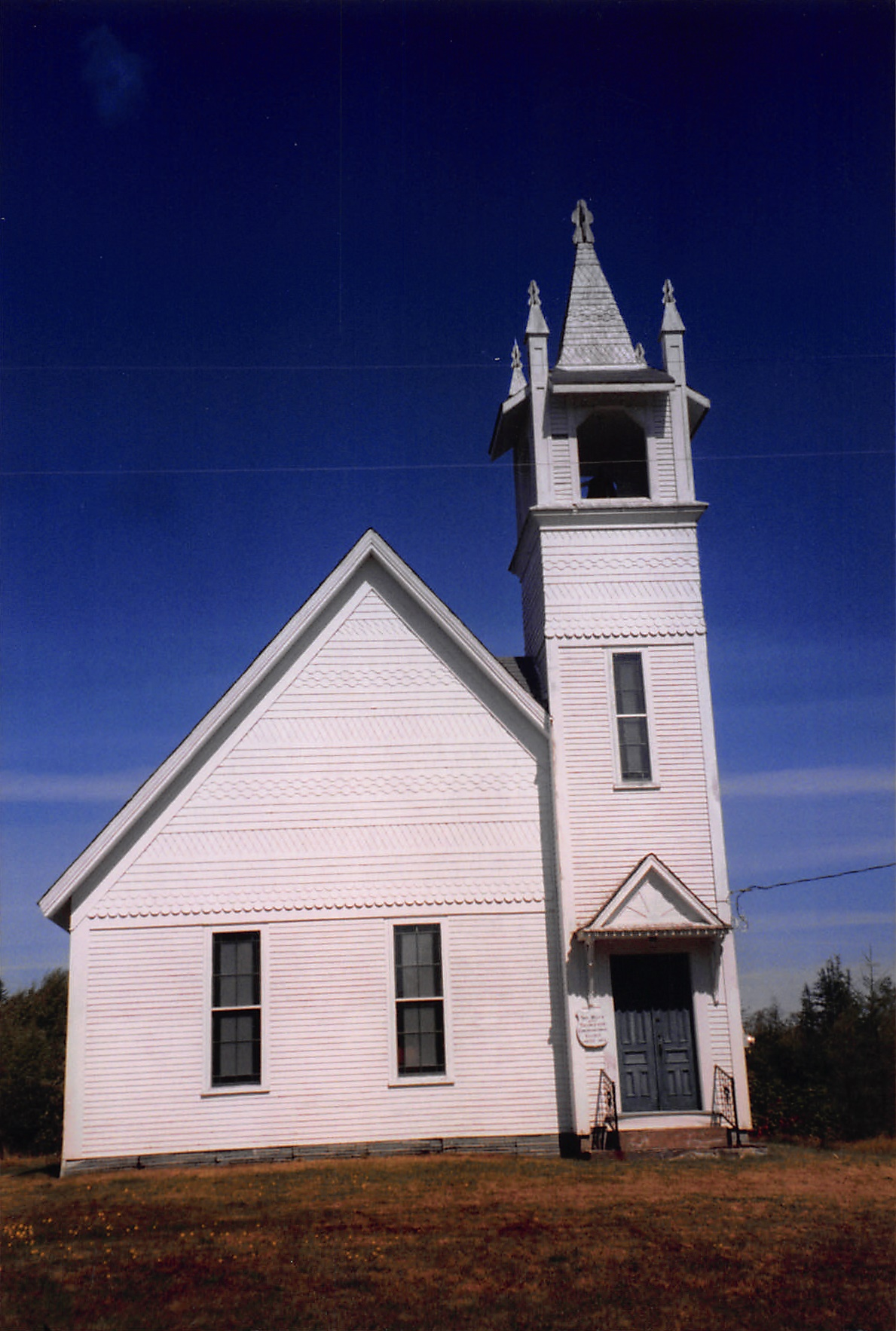
- Waite Congregational Church, established 1903

- Location within Maine Location within the United States
- Coordinates: 45°22′32″N 67°37′33″W
- Country: United States
- State: Maine
- County: Washington

Area
  - Total: 44.04 sq mi (114.06 km^{2})
  - Land: 43.98 sq mi (113.91 km^{2})
  - Water: 0.062 sq mi (0.16 km^{2})
- Elevation: 220 ft (67 m)

Population (2020)
  - Total: 66
  - Density: 1.6/sq mi (0.6/km^{2})
- Time zone: UTC-5 (Eastern (EST))
  - Summer (DST): UTC-4 (EDT)
- ZIP code: 04492
- Area code: 207
- FIPS code: 23-79375
- GNIS feature ID: 582784

Waite is a town in Washington County, Maine, United States. The town was named after Benjamin Waite, a lumberman and businessman from Calais, Maine. The population was 66 at the 2020 census.

Waite is a small community served by one general store. The town is also home to two logging contractors. Waite shares its zip code, 04492, with the neighboring town of Talmadge.

== Geography ==
According to the United States Census Bureau, the town has a total area of 44.04 square miles (114.06 km^{2}), of which 43.98 square miles (113.91 km^{2}) is land and 0.06 square miles (0.16 km^{2}) is water.

== Demographics ==
Historical population
Census	Pop.	Note	%±
1860	95		—
1870	122		28.4%
1880	204		67.2%
1890	159		−22.1%
1900	135		−15.1%
1910	162		20.0%
1920	186		14.8%
1930	165		−11.3%
1940	152		−7.9%
1950	117		−23.0%
1960	73		−37.6%
1970	70		−4.1%
1980	130		85.7%
1990	119		−8.5%
2000	105		−11.8%
2010	101		−3.8%
2020	66		−34.7%
U.S. Decennial Census

=== 2010 census ===
As of the census of 2010, there were 101 people, 43 households, and 31 families living in the town. The population density was 2.3 inhabitants per square mile (0.9/km^{2}). There were 72 housing units at an average density of 1.6 per square mile (0.6/km^{2}). The racial makeup of the town was 93.1% White and 6.9% Native American. Hispanic or Latino of any race were 4.0% of the population.

There were 43 households, of which 32.6% had children under the age of 18 living with them, 51.2% were married couples living together, 14.0% had a female householder with no husband present, 7.0% had a male householder with no wife present, and 27.9% were non-families. 18.6% of all households were made up of individuals, and 9.3% had someone living alone who was 65 years of age or older. The average household size was 2.35 and the average family size was 2.55.

The median age in the town was 48.1 years. 19.8% of residents were under the age of 18; 4% were between the ages of 18 and 24; 17.9% were from 25 to 44; 44.6% were from 45 to 64; and 13.9% were 65 years of age or older. The gender makeup of the town was 46.5% male and 53.5% female.

=== 2000 census ===
As of the census of 2000, there were 105 people, 49 households, and 32 families living in the town. The population density was 2.4 people per square mile (0.9/km^{2}). There were 84 housing units at an average density of 1.9 per square mile (0.8/km^{2}). The racial makeup of the town was 100.00% White.

There were 49 households, out of which 22.4% had children under the age of 18 living with them, 59.2% were married couples living together, 4.1% had a female householder with no husband present, and 32.7% were non-families. 28.6% of all households were made up of individuals, and 8.2% had someone living alone who was 65 years of age or older. The average household size was 2.14 and the average family size was 2.61.

In the town, the population was spread out, with 20.0% under the age of 18, 3.8% from 18 to 24, 31.4% from 25 to 44, 28.6% from 45 to 64, and 16.2% who were 65 years of age or older. The median age was 42 years. For every 100 females, there were 94.4 males. For every 100 females age 18 and over, there were 95.3 males.

The median income for a household in the town was $35,417, and the median income for a family was $31,667. Males had a median income of $48,438 versus $37,917 for females. The per capita income for the town was $17,618. There were 15.8% of families and 11.7% of the population living below the poverty line, including 10.7% of under eighteens and 19.2% of those over 64.
