= Northfield, Maine =

Town in Maine, United States

- Town
- Location within Maine Location within the United States
- Coordinates: 44°50′04″N 67°37′30″W
- Country: United States
- State: Maine
- County: Washington

Area
  - Total: 45.84 sq mi (118.73 km^{2})
  - Land: 43.58 sq mi (112.87 km^{2})
  - Water: 2.26 sq mi (5.85 km^{2})
- Elevation: 194 ft (59 m)

Population (2020)
  - Total: 178
  - Density: 4.1/sq mi (1.6/km^{2})
- Time zone: UTC-5 (Eastern (EST))
  - Summer (DST): UTC-4 (EDT)
- ZIP Code: 04654
- Area code: 207
- FIPS code: 23-51375
- GNIS feature ID: 582631
- Website: www.northfieldme.com

Northfield is a town in Washington County, Maine, United States. The population was 178 at the 2020 census.

== Geography ==
According to the United States Census Bureau, the town has a total area of 45.84 square miles (118.73 km^{2}), of which 43.58 square miles (112.87 km^{2}) is land and 2.26 square miles (5.85 km^{2}) is water.

== Demographics ==
Historical population
Census	Pop.	Note	%±
1840	232		—
1850	246		6.0%
1860	262		6.5%
1870	190		−27.5%
1880	193		1.6%
1890	143		−25.9%
1900	126		−11.9%
1910	81		−35.7%
1920	83		2.5%
1930	73		−12.0%
1940	57		−21.9%
1950	75		31.6%
1960	79		5.3%
1970	57		−27.8%
1980	88		54.4%
1990	99		12.5%
2000	131		32.3%
2010	148		13.0%
2020	178		20.3%
U.S. Decennial Census

=== 2010 census ===
As of the census of 2010, there were 148 people, 74 households, and 47 families living in the town. The population density was 3.4 inhabitants per square mile (1.3/km^{2}). There were 258 housing units at an average density of 5.9 per square mile (2.3/km^{2}). The racial makeup of the town was 98.6% White and 1.4% African American.

There were 74 households, of which 24.3% had children under the age of 18 living with them, 48.6% were married couples living together, 6.8% had a female householder with no husband present, 8.1% had a male householder with no wife present, and 36.5% were non-families. 32.4% of all households were made up of individuals, and 9.5% had someone living alone who was 65 years of age or older. The average household size was 2.00 and the average family size was 2.34.

The median age in the town was 55.2 years. 16.2% of residents were under the age of 18; 1.4% were between the ages of 18 and 24; 21% were from 25 to 44; 41.8% were from 45 to 64; and 19.6% were 65 years of age or older. The gender makeup of the town was 50.7% male and 49.3% female.

=== 2000 census ===
As of the census of 2000, there were 131 people, 61 households, and 32 families living in the town. The population density was 3.0 people per square mile (1.2/km^{2}). There were 224 housing units at an average density of 5.1 per square mile (2.0/km^{2}). The racial makeup of the town was 99.24% White, and 0.76% from two or more races. Hispanic or Latino of any race were 0.76% of the population.

There were 61 households, out of which 23.0% had children under the age of 18 living with them, 42.6% were married couples living together, 8.2% had a female householder with no husband present, and 47.5% were non-families. 36.1% of all households were made up of individuals, and 13.1% had someone living alone who was 65 years of age or older. The average household size was 2.15 and the average family size was 2.88.

In the town, the population was spread out, with 21.4% under the age of 18, 9.9% from 18 to 24, 26.7% from 25 to 44, 29.0% from 45 to 64, and 13.0% who were 65 years of age or older. The median age was 42 years. For every 100 females, there were 98.5 males. For every 100 females age 18 and over, there were 98.1 males.

The median income for a household in the town was $36,250, and the median income for a family was $51,875. Males had a median income of $28,750 versus $33,625 for females. The per capita income for the town was $23,048. There were no families and 7.1% of the population living below the poverty line, including no under eighteens and 9.5% of those over 64.
