= Talmadge, Maine =

Town in Maine, United States

- Town
- Location within Maine Location within the United States
- Coordinates: 45°21′29″N 67°44′35″W
- Country: United States
- State: Maine
- County: Washington

Area
  - Total: 39.06 sq mi (101.16 km^{2})
  - Land: 37.80 sq mi (97.90 km^{2})
  - Water: 1.26 sq mi (3.26 km^{2})
- Elevation: 479 ft (146 m)

Population (2020)
  - Total: 70
  - Density: 1.8/sq mi (0.7/km^{2})
- Time zone: UTC-5 (Eastern (EST))
  - Summer (DST): UTC-4 (EDT)
- ZIP Codes: 04492 (Talmadge); 04490 (Topsfield)
- Area code: 207
- FIPS code: 23-75770
- GNIS feature ID: 582760
- Website: talmadge.me

Talmadge is a town in Washington County, Maine, United States. The town was named after landowner Benjamin Tallmadge. The population was 70 at the 2020 census.

== Geography ==
According to the United States Census Bureau, the town has a total area of 39.06 square miles (101.16 km^{2}), of which 37.80 square miles (97.90 km^{2}) is land and 1.26 square miles (3.26 km^{2}) is water.

== Demographics ==
Historical population
| Census | Pop. | Note | %± |
|---|---|---|---|
| 1860 | 96 | | — |
| 1870 | 80 | | −16.7% |
| 1880 | 112 | | 40.0% |
| 1890 | 112 | | 0.0% |
| 1900 | 93 | | −17.0% |
| 1910 | 100 | | 7.5% |
| 1920 | 80 | | −20.0% |
| 1930 | 46 | | −42.5% |
| 1940 | 50 | | 8.7% |
| 1950 | 66 | | 32.0% |
| 1960 | 58 | | −12.1% |
| 1970 | 25 | | −56.9% |
| 1980 | 40 | | 60.0% |
| 1990 | 62 | | 55.0% |
| 2000 | 70 | | 12.9% |
| 2010 | 64 | | −8.6% |
| 2020 | 70 | | 9.4% |
U.S. Decennial Census

=== 2010 census ===
As of the census of 2010, there were 64 people, 30 households, and 21 families living in the town. The population density was 1.7 inhabitants per square mile (0.7/km^{2}). There were 61 housing units at an average density of 1.6 per square mile (0.6/km^{2}). The racial makeup of the town was 100.0% White.

There were 30 households, of which 26.7% had children under the age of 18 living with them, 50.0% were married couples living together, 13.3% had a female householder with no husband present, 6.7% had a male householder with no wife present, and 30.0% were non-families. 30.0% of all households were made up of individuals, and 10% had someone living alone who was 65 years of age or older. The average household size was 2.13 and the average family size was 2.52.

The median age in the town was 54.3 years. 17.2% of residents were under the age of 18; 4.7% were between the ages of 18 and 24; 6.4% were from 25 to 44; 48.4% were from 45 to 64; and 23.4% were 65 years of age or older. The gender makeup of the town was 45.3% male and 54.7% female.

=== 2000 census ===
As of the census of 2000, there were 70 people, 31 households, and 22 families living in the town. The population density was 1.9 people per square mile (0.7/km^{2}). There were 60 housing units at an average density of 1.6 per square mile (0.6/km^{2}). The racial makeup of the town was 97.14% White, and 2.86% from two or more races.

There were 31 households, out of which 16.1% had children under the age of 18 living with them, 61.3% were married couples living together, 9.7% had a female householder with no husband present, and 29.0% were non-families. 25.8% of all households were made up of individuals, and 3.2% had someone living alone who was 65 years of age or older. The average household size was 2.26 and the average family size was 2.55.

In the town, the population was spread out, with 18.6% under the age of 18, 2.9% from 18 to 24, 20.0% from 25 to 44, 35.7% from 45 to 64, and 22.9% who were 65 years of age or older. The median age was 52 years. For every 100 females, there were 94.4 males. For every 100 females age 18 and over, there were 119.2 males.

The median income for a household in the town was $29,583, and the median income for a family was $29,583. Males had a median income of $0 versus $21,667 for females. The per capita income for the town was $16,816. There were 23.8% of families and 22.0% of the population living below the poverty line, including no under eighteens and 30.8% of those over 64.
