= Moir Farm =

Coordinates: 46.8981°N 68.0785°W

The Moir Farm is an historic farmstead in Woodland, Aroostook County, Maine, United States. It was established in 1837 as one of the first white settler establishments in the Allagash region.
