= Bear Brook Watershed in Maine =

Forest in the United States

Coordinates: 44.861781°N 68.106917°W

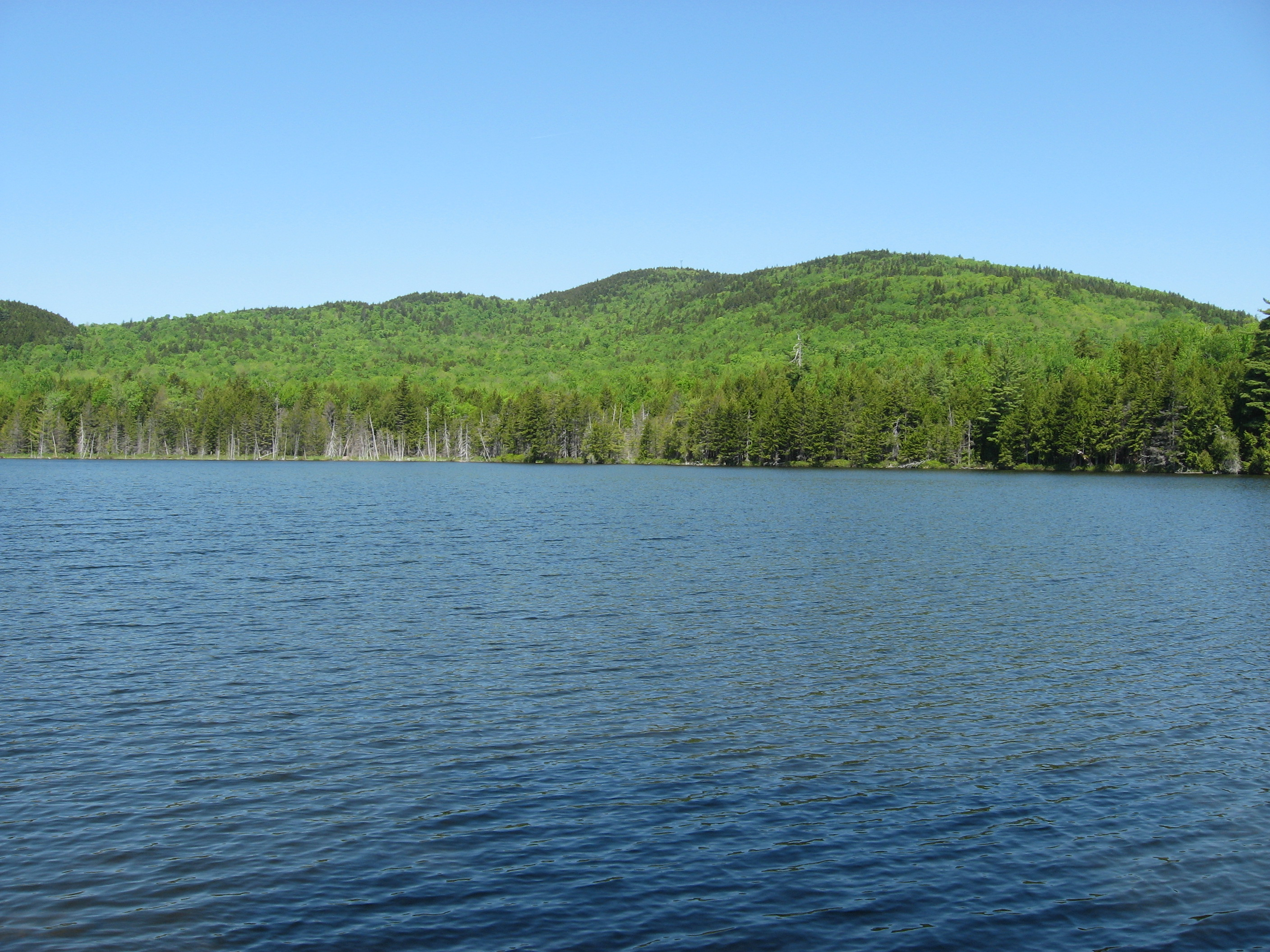
Bear Pond and Lead Mountain

The Bear Brook Watershed in Maine (BBWM) is an experimental forest operated by the University of Maine in Hancock County, Maine, United States. The BBWM focuses around the two small first order branches of Bear Brook on the southeastern slopes of Lead Mountain above Bear Pond. Two years of monitoring studies began in 1987, after which the two watersheds of East and West Bear Brook were determined to be nearly identical. The West Bear Brook watershed was experimentally acidified with ammonium sulfate every other month from November 1989 until August 2016 to study the effects of sulfur and nitrogen acid deposition. East Bear Brook has been used as an untreated reference. Related research topics at BBWM include climate change, carbon sequestration, base cation depletion, and watershed biogeochemistry. There are two USGS stream gauges on the East and West Branches of Bear Brook.
