= Lead Mountain (Maine) =

Mountain in Maine, United States

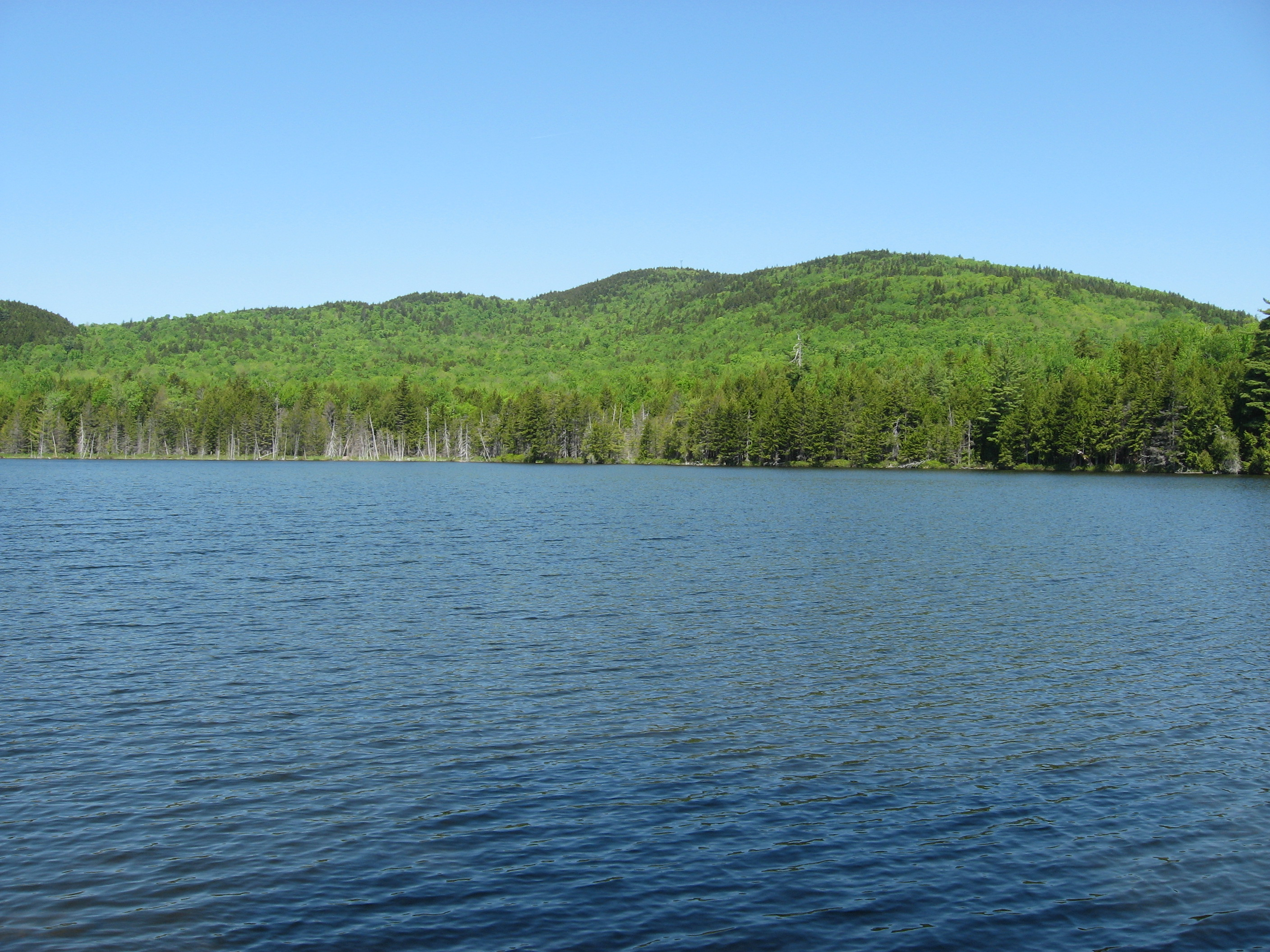
- Lead Mountain and Bear Pond from the south

Highest point
- Elevation: 1479+ ft (451+ m) NAVD 88
- Prominence: 1,120 ft (340 m)
- Coordinates: 44°51′52″N 68°06′37″W

Geography
- Location within Maine
- Location: Hancock County, Maine, U.S.
- Topo map: USGS Lead Mountain

Climbing
- Easiest route: Hiking, class 1

Lead Mountain, at 1,479-foot (451 m) high is a peak in eastern Maine. Lead Mountain is located north of the town of Beddington on the border of Hancock and Washington counties in Downeast Maine. The isolation of Lead Mountain is 35.73 miles, and it is easily visible from miles away along Maine state routes 9 and 193

The southern slopes of Lead Mountain are the location of the Bear Brook Watershed in Maine, a long-term research site dedicated to studying the effects of acid deposition on a landscape. Likewise, the southeast slopes of the mountain are drained by Bear Brook. The bedrock of the area contains small blebs of pyrrhotite, which may be mistaken for lead.

Lead Mountain is located on private land, but can be hiked by the public. The primary route to Lead Mountain begins just north of the gated end of a dirt road southeast of the peak. The route follows the dirt road beyond the gate before turning up a path that ascends southeast of the summit before continuing up the east side of the mountain to reach the summit.

On a clear day views from the summit stretch to the south to Acadia National Park and the Gulf of Maine. There are two communication towers on the summit. South of the mountain is the small Bear Pond, while the much larger Upper Lead Mountain Pond is west of the mountain.

== Gallery ==
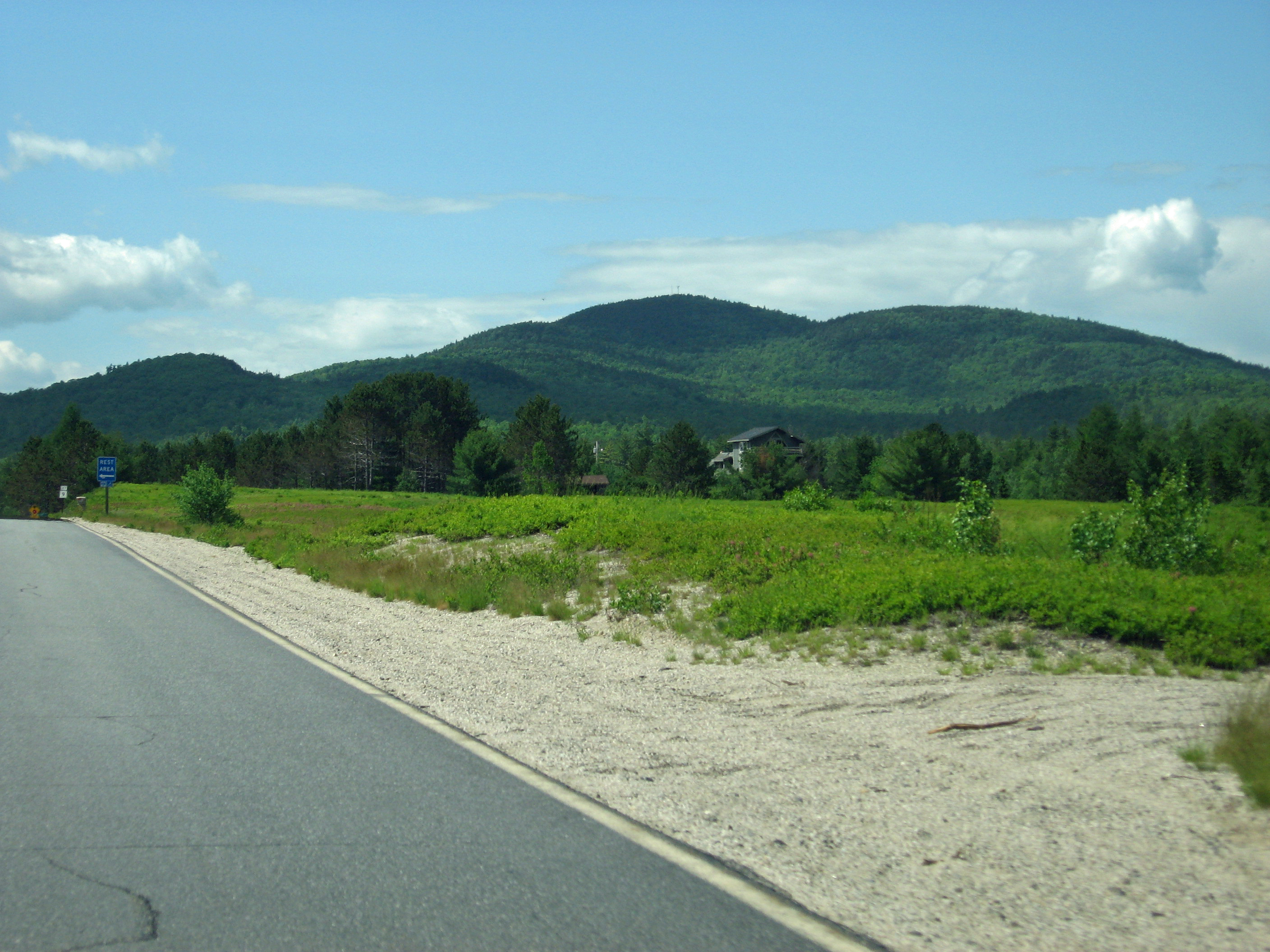
Lead Mountain from Maine 193

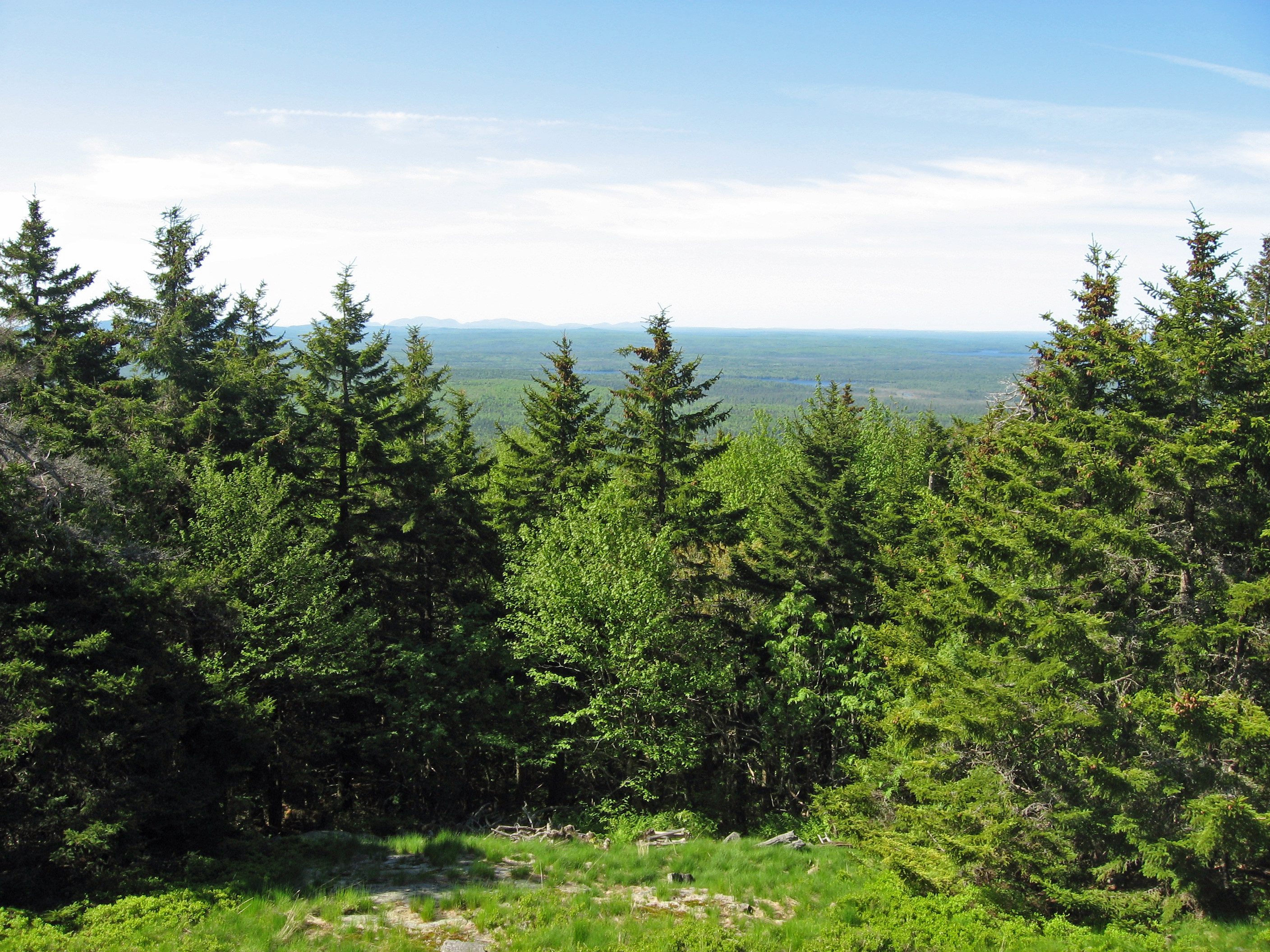
Looking south from Lead Mountain

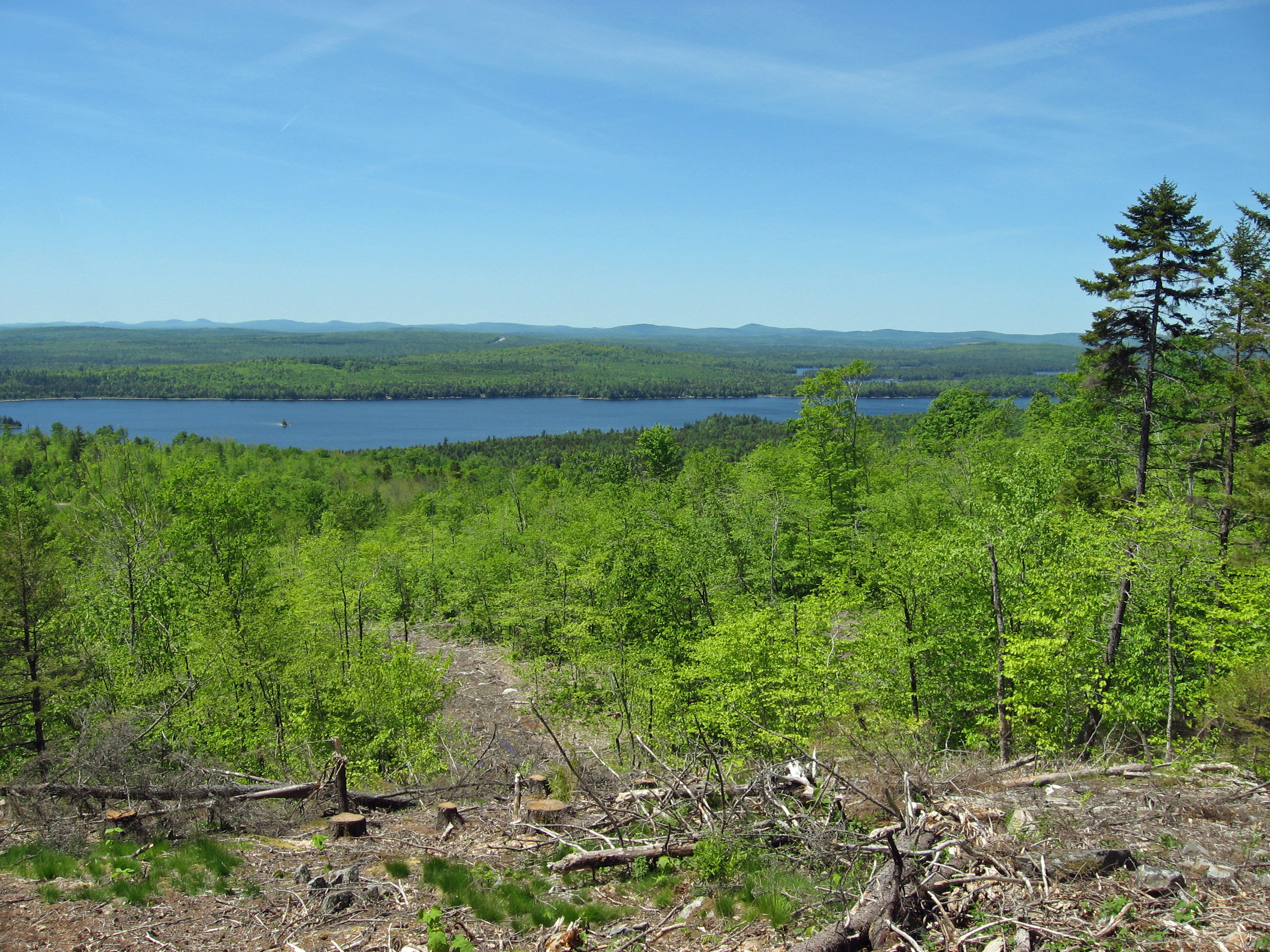
Upper Lead Mountain Pond from S ridge of Lead Mt.

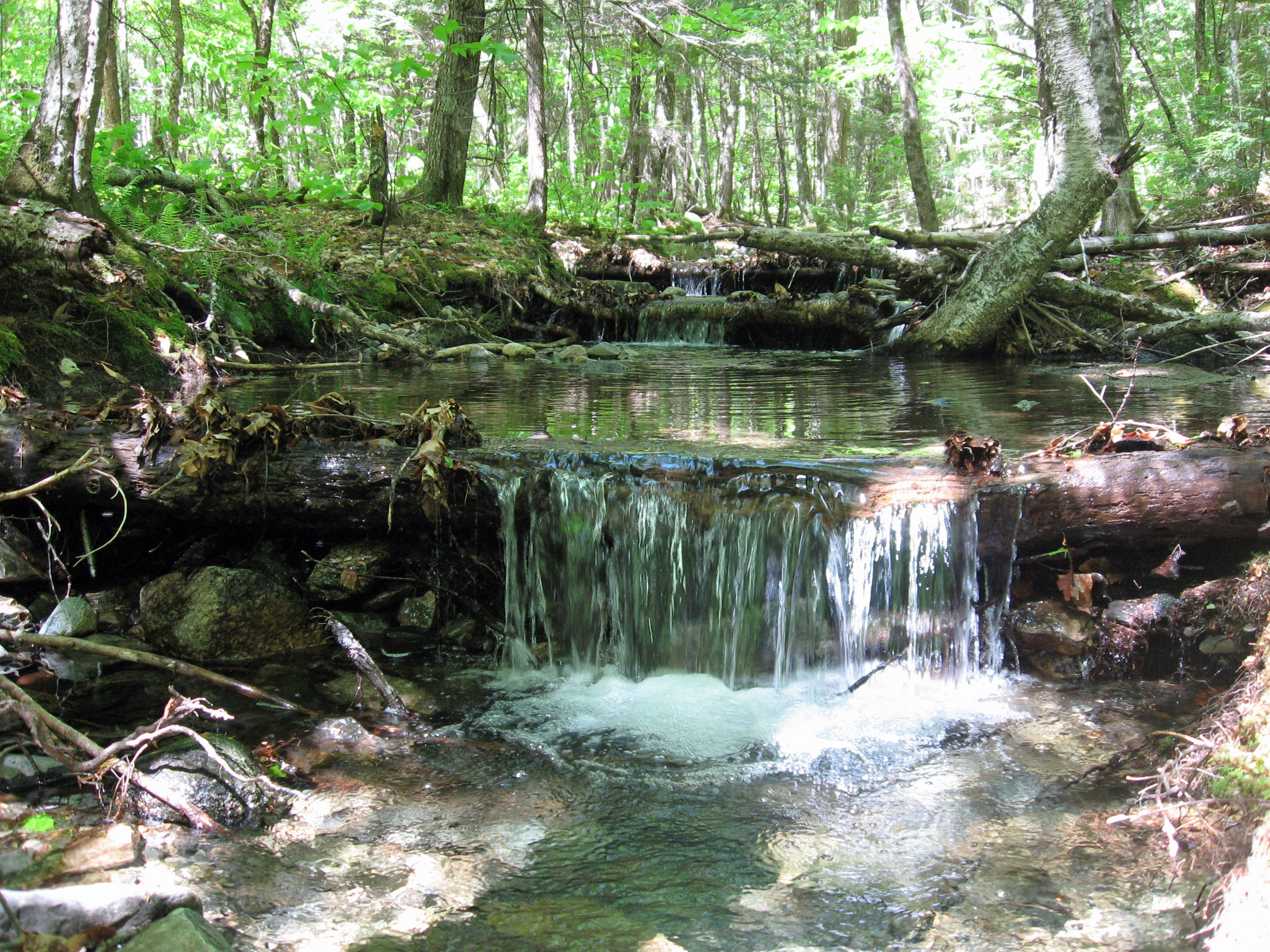
Bear Brook on the lower slopes of Lead Mt.

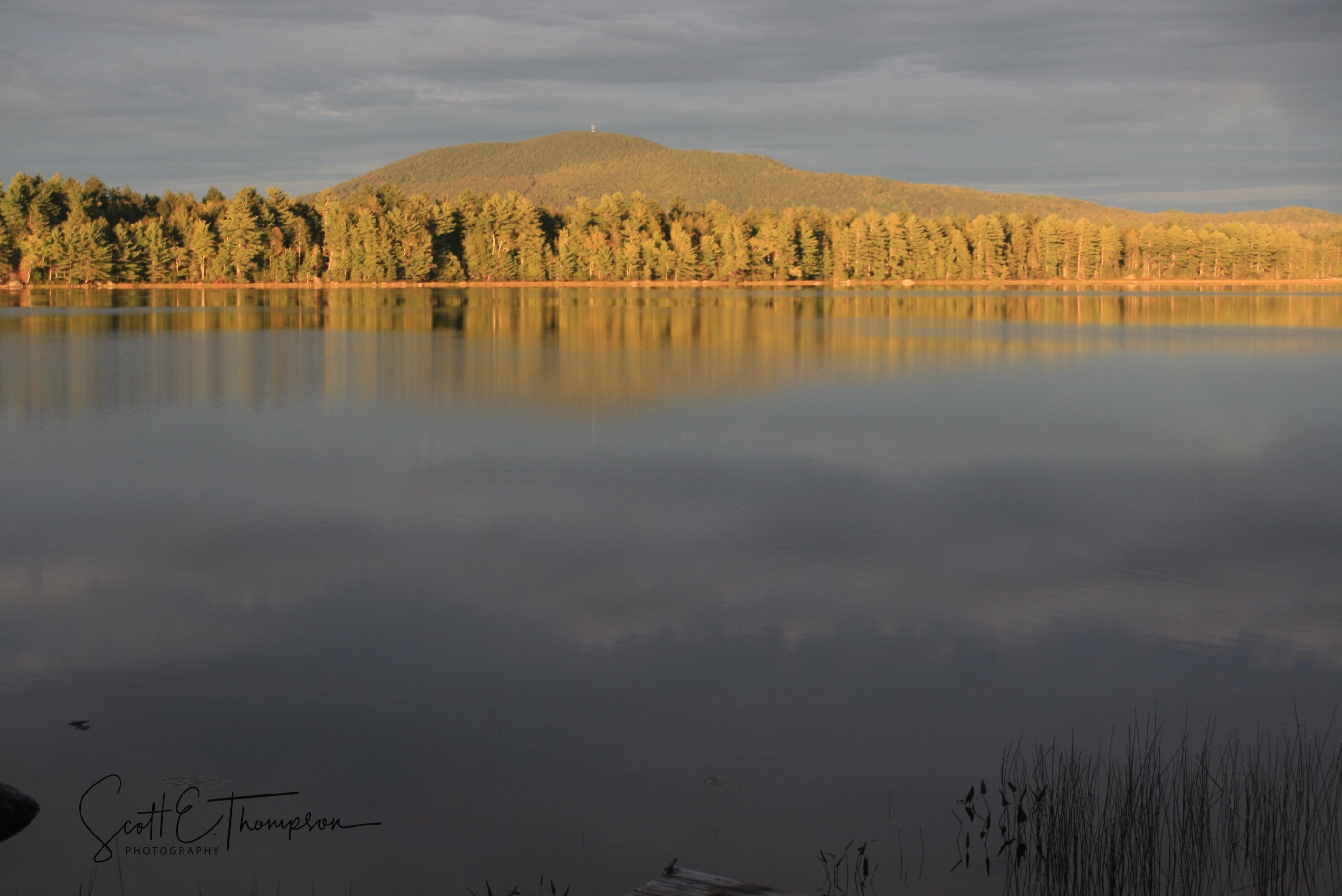
Lead Mountain as seen from Lower Lead Mountain Pond, September 2012.
