= Wesley, Maine =

Town in Maine, United States

- Town
- Location within Maine Location within the United States
- Coordinates: 44°53′28″N 67°38′27″W
- Country: United States
- State: Maine
- County: Washington

Area
  - Total: 50.64 sq mi (131.16 km^{2})
  - Land: 49.88 sq mi (129.19 km^{2})
  - Water: 0.76 sq mi (1.97 km^{2})
- Elevation: 289 ft (88 m)

Population (2020)
  - Total: 122
  - Density: 2.3/sq mi (0.9/km^{2})
- Time zone: UTC-5 (Eastern (EST))
  - Summer (DST): UTC-4 (EDT)
- ZIP code: 04686
- Area code: 207
- FIPS code: 23-81685
- GNIS feature ID: 582800

Wesley is a town in Washington County, Maine, United States. The town was named after John Wesley, founder of the English Methodist movement. The population was 122 at the 2020 census.

== Geography ==
According to the United States Census Bureau, the town has a total area of 50.64 square miles (131.16 km^{2}), of which 49.88 square miles (129.19 km^{2}) is land and 0.76 square miles (1.97 km^{2}) is water.

=== Climate ===
This climatic region is typified by large seasonal temperature differences, with warm to hot (and often humid) summers and cold (sometimes severely cold) winters. According to the Köppen Climate Classification system, Wesley has a humid continental climate, abbreviated "Dfb" on climate maps.

=== Roads ===
Wesley is at the intersection of state routes 9 and 192.

== Demographics ==
Historical population
Census	Pop.	Note	%±
1840	255		—
1850	329		29.0%
1860	343		4.3%
1870	336		−2.0%
1880	245		−27.1%
1890	227		−7.3%
1900	198		−12.8%
1910	172		−13.1%
1920	146		−15.1%
1930	170		16.4%
1940	157		−7.6%
1950	149		−5.1%
1960	145		−2.7%
1970	110		−24.1%
1980	140		27.3%
1990	146		4.3%
2000	114		−21.9%
2010	98		−14.0%
2020	122		24.5%
U.S. Decennial Census

=== 2010 census ===
As of the census of 2010, there were 98 people, 50 households, and 31 families living in the town. The population density was 2.0 inhabitants per square mile (0.8/km^{2}). There were 202 housing units at an average density of 4.0 per square mile (1.5/km^{2}). The racial makeup of the town was 96.9% White, 1.0% Asian, and 2.0% from two or more races.

There were 50 households, of which 14.0% had children under the age of 18 living with them, 52.0% were married couples living together, 10.0% had a female householder with no husband present, and 38.0% were non-families. 26.0% of all households were made up of individuals, and 18% had someone living alone who was 65 years of age or older. The average household size was 1.96 and the average family size was 2.29.

The median age in the town was 54.5 years. 10.2% of residents were under the age of 18; 2% were between the ages of 18 and 24; 17.2% were from 25 to 44; 38.8% were from 45 to 64; and 31.6% were 65 years of age or older. The gender makeup of the town was 53.1% male and 46.9% female.

=== 2000 census ===
As of the census of 2000, there were 114 people, 51 households, and 34 families living in the town. The population density was 2.3 people per square mile (0.9/km^{2}). There were 150 housing units at an average density of 3.0 per square mile (1.2/km^{2}). The racial makeup of the town was 97.37% White, 1.75% Native American, and 0.88% from two or more races.

There were 51 households, out of which 27.5% had children under the age of 18 living with them, 52.9% were married couples living together, 9.8% had a female householder with no husband present, and 33.3% were non-families. 27.5% of all households were made up of individuals, and 9.8% had someone living alone who was 65 years of age or older. The average household size was 2.24 and the average family size was 2.74.

In the town, the population was spread out, with 25.4% under the age of 18, 2.6% from 18 to 24, 23.7% from 25 to 44, 28.1% from 45 to 64, and 20.2% who were 65 years of age or older. The median age was 44 years. For every 100 females, there were 93.2 males. For every 100 females age 18 and over, there were 97.7 males.

The median income for a household in the town was $21,667, and the median income for a family was $20,833. Males had a median income of $21,750 versus $23,750 for females. The per capita income for the town was $11,314. There were 34.4% of families and 38.5% of the population living below the poverty line, including 46.7% of under eighteens and 23.5% of those over 64.

== Education ==
It is in the Wesley School District.

Wesley Elementary's peak enrollment was 25. Enrollment declined, and from about 2008 to 2023 there were three times that entities tried to shutter the school. In the 2021-2022 school year, it had eight students. That year, the school board voted to close the school, but residents in a referendum voted to keep the school open on a 39-24 basis. The following year, it had four students. As of 2023 the Wesley district pays high schools to take in its students as Wesley does not have its own high school.
