= Woodland, Washington County, Maine =

Woodland, Maine
- Census-designated place
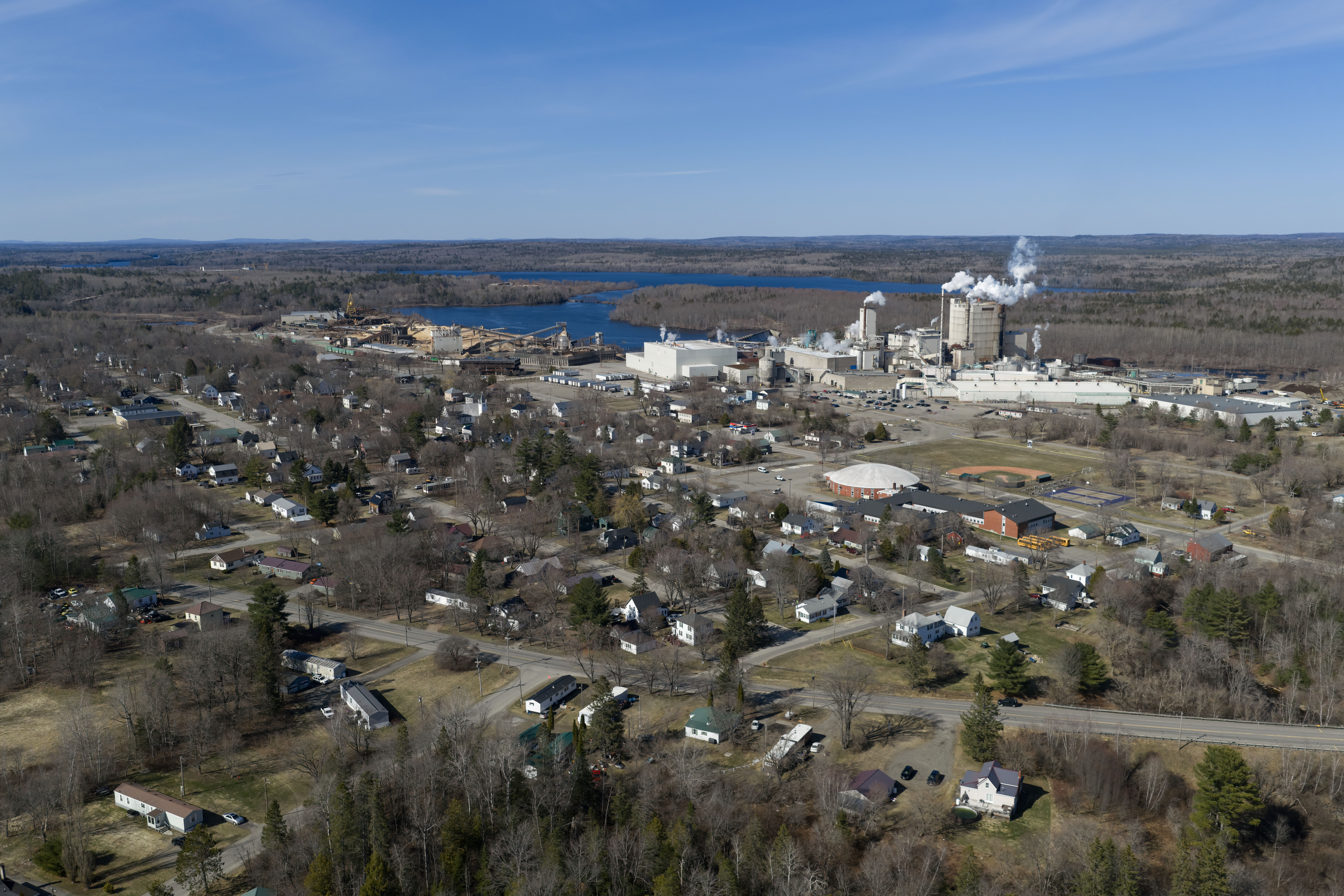
- Aerial view

- Location within Maine Location within the United States
- Coordinates: 45°09′30″N 67°24′37″W
- Country: United States
- State: Maine
- County: Washington

Area
  - Total: 1.5 sq mi (3.9 km^{2})
  - Land: 1.1 sq mi (2.8 km^{2})
  - Water: 0.3 sq mi (0.78 km^{2})
- Elevation: 171 ft (52 m)

Population (2010)
  - Total: 952
  - Density: 870/sq mi (330/km^{2})
- Time zone: UTC-5 (Eastern (EST))
  - Summer (DST): UTC-4 (EDT)
- ZIP Code: 04694 (Baileyville)
- GNIS feature ID: 2377972

Woodland is a census-designated place (CDP) in the town of Baileyville, Washington County, Maine, United States. The population was 952 at the 2010 census.

The name of "Woodland" was changed from "Sprague's Falls" to "Woodland" by the Postmaster General in 1906. "Woodland", originally known as "Sprague's Falls" was a village within the town of Baileyville and the post office address of the entire town of Baileyville and, therefore, Baileyville was routinely referred to as "Woodland". Baileyville was incorporated in 1828. However, because the state of Maine has a law stating that no two towns within it may share the same name, Woodland of Aroostook County and Woodland of Washington County found themselves before the Maine Supreme Judicial Court in the late 1990s. Because it was founded as a township first, the Woodland of Aroostook County was allowed to keep its name, and Woodland of Washington County was ordered by the court to its official, incorporated name of Baileyville.

== Geography ==
Baileyville is located at 45°9′18″N 67°24′25″W (45.155103, -67.406968).

According to the United States Census Bureau, the CDP has a total area of 1.5 square miles (3.8 km^{2}), of which 1.1 square miles (3.0 km^{2}) is land and 0.3 square miles (0.8 km^{2}), or 20.69%, is water.

== History ==
Water powered sawmills and paper mills at Woodland used wooden logs and pulpwood floated down the Saint Croix River. These mills were connected to the national rail network via the Maine Central Railroad and under Georgia-Pacific operation originated or terminated over 6,000 railway carloads in 1973.

In 1950, the village voted to stay on Daylight saving time, so as to allow hunters an extra hour of daylight after work, as they would otherwise be hunting at night. It was known locally as "Deerlight Saving Time" and overlapped with the start of deer season, through November 1.

== Demographics ==
As of the census of 2000, there were 1,044 people, 455 households, and 293 families residing in the CDP. The population density was 906.7 inhabitants per square mile (350.1/km^{2}). There were 553 housing units at an average density of 480.3 per square mile (185.4/km^{2}). The racial makeup of the CDP was 98.66% White, 0.10% African American, 0.10% Native American, 0.19% Asian, 0.10% from other races, and 0.86% from two or more races. Hispanic or Latino of any race were 0.10% of the population.

There were 455 households, out of which 28.1% had children under the age of 18 living with them, 50.5% were married couples living together, 10.1% had a female householder with no husband present, and 35.4% were non-families. 30.3% of all households were made up of individuals, and 14.7% had someone living alone who was 65 years of age or older. The average household size was 2.29 and the average family size was 2.83.

In the CDP, the population was spread out, with 23.9% under the age of 18, 6.2% from 18 to 24, 26.4% from 25 to 44, 25.4% from 45 to 64, and 18.0% who were 65 years of age or older. The median age was 41 years. For every 100 females, there were 93.0 males. For every 100 females age 18 and over, there were 89.5 males.

The median income for a household in the CDP was $32,179, and the median income for a family was $38,571. Males had a median income of $38,750 versus $21,354 for females. The per capita income for the CDP was $17,220. About 8.0% of families and 9.5% of the population were below the poverty line, including 13.5% of those under age 18 and 8.2% of those age 65 or over.
