= Baileyville, Maine =

Town in Maine, United States

Baileyville, Maine Woodland
- Town
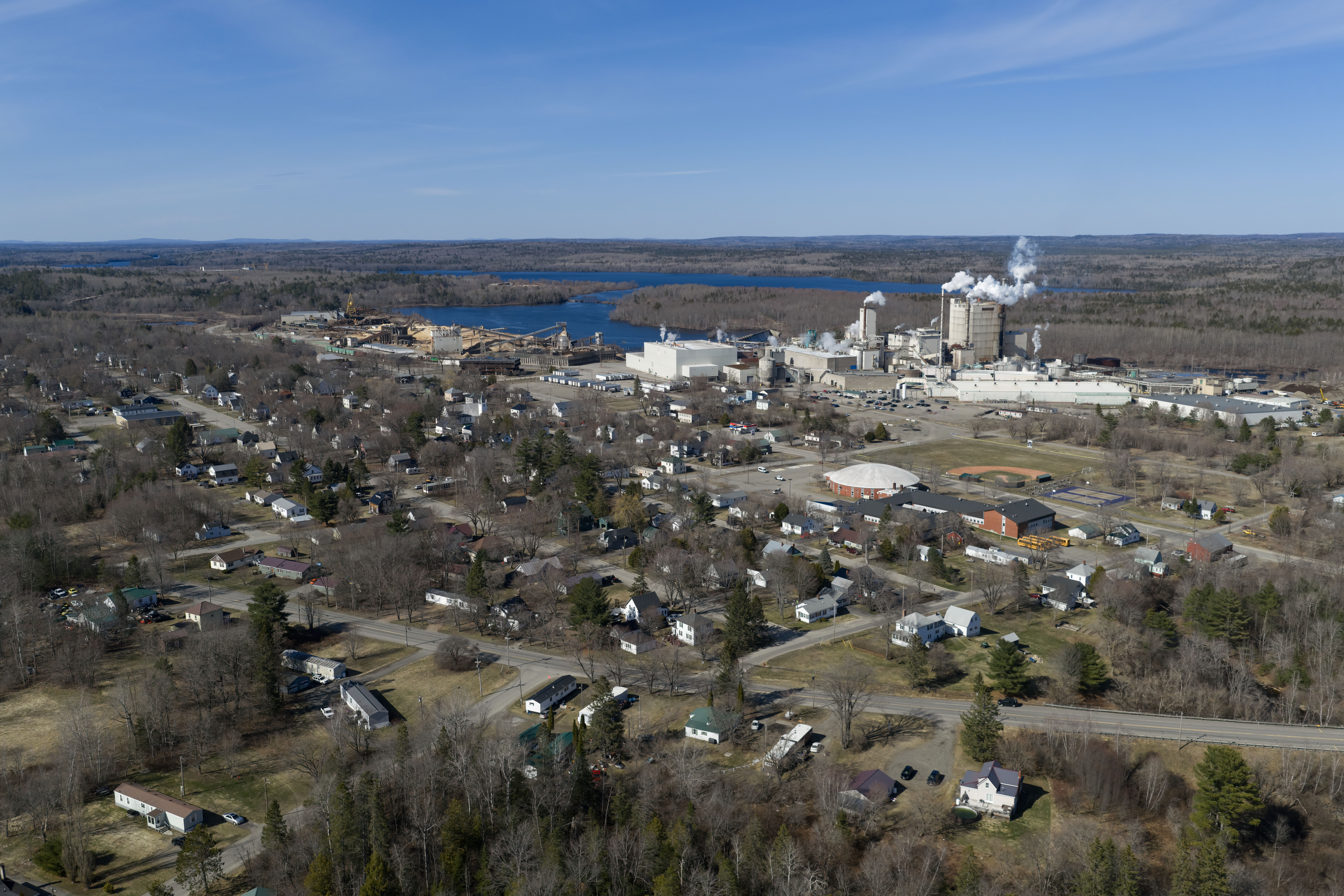
- Downtown Woodland

- Logo
- Motto: "...The Road to Home"
- Location within Maine Location within the United States
- Coordinates: 45°10′40″N 67°26′28″W
- Country: United States
- State: Maine
- County: Washington

Area
  - Total: 41.91 sq mi (108.55 km^{2})
  - Land: 37.15 sq mi (96.22 km^{2})
  - Water: 4.76 sq mi (12.33 km^{2})
- Elevation: 285 ft (87 m)

Population (2020)
  - Total: 1,318
  - Density: 35/sq mi (13.7/km^{2})
- Time zone: UTC-5 (Eastern (EST))
  - Summer (DST): UTC-4 (EDT)
- ZIP Code: 04694
- Area code: 207
- FIPS code: 23-02480
- GNIS feature ID: 582337
- Website: baileyvillemaine.com

Baileyville is a town in Washington County, Maine, United States. The population was 1,318 at the 2020 census. Within the town is the census-designated place of Woodland. The town was originally settled by Quakers in 1780. In 1830, Ezekiel Bailey began the commercial manufacture of oilcloth. The business flourished and expanded until it comprised several factories, which burned down in 1921.

== Geography ==
According to the United States Census Bureau, the town has a total area of 41.91 square miles (108.55 km^{2}), of which 37.15 square miles (96.22 km^{2}) is land and 4.76 square miles (12.33 km^{2}) is water.

== History ==
Water powered sawmills and paper mills at Woodland used wooden logs and pulpwood floated down the Saint Croix River. These mills were connected to the national rail network via the Maine Central Railroad and under Georgia-Pacific operation originated or terminated over 6,000 railway carloads in 1973. The Maine Central business has since been discontinued, and the only rail service left as of 2012 was a spur line that connected Woodland to St. Stephen, New Brunswick for the shipment of pulp and paper to Saint John.

== Demographics ==
Historical population
Census	Pop.	Note	%±
1830	189		—
1840	329		74.1%
1850	431		31.0%
1860	363		−15.8%
1870	377		3.9%
1880	376		−0.3%
1890	226		−39.9%
1900	215		−4.9%
1910	1,137		428.8%
1920	2,243		97.3%
1930	2,017		−10.1%
1940	2,018		0.0%
1950	1,821		−9.8%
1960	1,863		2.3%
1970	2,167		16.3%
1980	2,188		1.0%
1990	2,031		−7.2%
2000	1,686		−17.0%
2010	1,521		−9.8%
2020	1,318		−13.3%
U.S. Decennial Census

=== 2010 census ===
As of the census of 2010, there were 1,521 people, 662 households, and 444 families residing in the town. The population density was 40.9 inhabitants per square mile (15.8/km^{2}). There were 875 housing units at an average density of 23.6 per square mile (9.1/km^{2}). The racial makeup of the town was 95.7% White, 0.7% African American, 0.8% Native American, 0.7% Asian, 0.1% Pacific Islander, 0.2% from other races, and 1.9% from two or more races. Hispanic or Latino of any race were 0.7% of the population.

There were 662 households, of which 28.1% had children under the age of 18 living with them, 49.2% were married couples living together, 12.7% had a female householder with no husband present, 5.1% had a male householder with no wife present, and 32.9% were non-families. 27.6% of all households were made up of individuals, and 13.4% had someone living alone who was 65 years of age or older. The average household size was 2.30 and the average family size was 2.73.

The median age in the town was 46.8 years. 21.2% of residents were under the age of 18; 5.1% were between the ages of 18 and 24; 21.5% were from 25 to 44; 32.4% were from 45 to 64; and 20% were 65 years of age or older. The gender makeup of the town was 48.1% male and 51.9% female.

=== 2000 census ===
As of the census of 2000, there were 1,686 people, 726 households, and 484 families residing in the town. The population density was 46.2 inhabitants per square mile (17.8/km^{2}). There were 927 housing units at an average density of 25.4 per square mile (9.8/km^{2}). The racial makeup of the town was 98.22% White, 0.06% African American, 0.12% Native American, 0.12% Asian, 0.59% from other races, and 0.89% from two or more races. Hispanic or Latino of any race were 0.59% of the population.

There were 726 households, out of which 26.4% had children under the age of 18 living with them, 54.0% were married couples living together, 8.8% had a female householder with no husband present, and 33.2% were non-families. 28.4% of all households were made up of individuals, and 12.5% had someone living alone who was 65 years of age or older. The average household size was 2.32 and the average family size was 2.82.

In the town, the population was spread out, with 22.8% under the age of 18, 6.3% from 18 to 24, 26.9% from 25 to 44, 27.5% from 45 to 64, and 16.4% who were 65 years of age or older. The median age was 42 years. For every 100 females, there were 95.6 males. For every 100 females age 18 and over, there were 92.6 males.

The median income for a household in the town was $31,658, and the median income for a family was $37,292. Males had a median income of $38,269 versus $19,531 for females. The per capita income for the town was $17,087. About 9.1% of families and 10.1% of the population were below the poverty line, including 12.5% of those under age 18 and 8.9% of those age 65 or over.

== Education ==
It is in the Baileyville School District, a component of Eastern Maine Area School System Alternative Organizational System 90. The elementary school is Baileyville Elementary School.

The high school, Woodland Jr./Sr. High School, has about 250 students in grades 7–12. The school's principal is Patricia Metta. Woodland Jr/Sr High School's mascot is the Dragons, and the school's colors are purple and gold.

The Maine Department of Education is responsible for school assignments in unorganized territories. It lists Woodland High School as an option for residents Codyville in Penobscot County and Atkinson in Piscatiquis County.

== Notable residents ==
- Althea Currier, actress
