= East Hancock, Maine =

- Unorganized territory
- Location within Maine Location within the United States
- Coordinates: 44°48′20″N 68°08′42″W
- Country: United States
- State: Maine
- County: Hancock

Area
  - Total: 481.2 sq mi (1,246.4 km^{2})
  - Land: 444.2 sq mi (1,150.6 km^{2})
  - Water: 37.0 sq mi (95.8 km^{2})
- Elevation: 469 ft (143 m)

Population (2020)
  - Total: 85
- Time zone: UTC-5 (Eastern (EST))
  - Summer (DST): UTC-4 (EDT)
- ZIP Codes: 04408 (Aurora); 04607 (Gouldsboro); 04622 (Cherryfield); 04634 (Franklin); 04664 (Sullivan)
- Area code: 207
- FIPS code: 23-20405
- GNIS feature ID: 582456

East Hancock is an unorganized territory in Hancock County, Maine, United States. The population was 85 at the 2020 census.

== Geography ==
According to the United States Census Bureau, the unorganized territory has a total area of 481.2 square miles (1,246.4 km^{2}), of which 444.3 square miles (1,150.6 km^{2}) is land and 37.0 square miles (95.8 km^{2}) (7.68%) is water.

The territory consists of thirteen townships located along the northern and eastern border of the county.

== Demographics ==
Historical population
Census	Pop.	Note	%±
1970	20		—
1980	44		120.0%
1990	40		−9.1%
2000	73		82.5%
2010	94		28.8%
2020	85		−9.6%
U.S. Decennial Census

As of the census of 2000, there were 73 people, 32 households, and 18 families residing in the unorganized territory. The population density was 0.2 inhabitants per square mile (0.077/km^{2}). There were 580 housing units at an average density of 1.3 per square mile (0.50/km^{2}). The racial makeup of the unorganized territory was 97.26% White, 1.37% Native American, and 1.37% from two or more races.

There were 32 households, out of which 18.8% had children under the age of 18 living with them, 53.1% were married couples living together, 3.1% had a female householder with no husband present, and 43.8% were non-families. 34.4% of all households were made up of individuals, and 15.6% had someone living alone who was 65 years of age or older. The average household size was 2.28 and the average family size was 2.83.

In the unorganized territory the population was spread out, with 17.8% under the age of 18, 6.8% from 18 to 24, 20.5% from 25 to 44, 38.4% from 45 to 64, and 16.4% who were 65 years of age or older. The median age was 48 years. For every 100 females, there were 92.1 males. For every 100 females age 18 and over, there were 93.5 males.

The median income for a household in the unorganized territory was $31,875, and the median income for a family was $42,500. Males had a median income of $32,083 versus $12,083 for females. The per capita income for the unorganized territory was $18,156. There were no families and 2.8% of the population living below the poverty line, including no under eighteens and 13.3% of those over 64.
