= East Range II Community School District =

School district in Maine, United States

East Range II Community School District is a school district headquartered in Topsfield, Maine. The district's sole school is East Range II CSD School, a K-8 school. It is a part of the Eastern Maine Area School System (Alternative Organizational System 90 or AOS 90).

== History ==
In 1973 voters in Topsfield approved creating the school district.

The district was created including Topsfield, a town; and Codyville, then a plantation. The district committee was first created in November 1973.

The East Range II School campus opened in 1976. The cost was $200,000.

In 2019 Codyville de-organized, and as a result, left the school district. As of 2025 the Maine Department of Education, which coordinates education in unorganized areas, assigns Codyville to East Range II school.

== School ==
In 2023, the school had 25 students. Teachers had certifications to teach all relevant grade levels, and their classrooms had students of different grades. Joyce Kryszak of The Maine Monitor described East Range II CSD as "a hub, taking students from several surrounding far-flung towns and unorganized territories".
