= Topsfield, Maine =

Town in Maine, United States

- Town
- Location within Maine Location within the United States
- Coordinates: 45°26′24″N 67°46′36″W
- Country: United States
- State: Maine
- County: Washington

Area
  - Total: 55.32 sq mi (143.28 km^{2})
  - Land: 50.09 sq mi (129.73 km^{2})
  - Water: 5.23 sq mi (13.55 km^{2})
- Elevation: 692 ft (211 m)

Population (2020)
  - Total: 179
  - Density: 3.6/sq mi (1.4/km^{2})
- Time zone: UTC-5 (Eastern (EST))
  - Summer (DST): UTC-4 (EDT)
- ZIP code: 04490
- Area code: 207
- FIPS code: 23-76895
- GNIS feature ID: 582765

Topsfield is a town in Washington County, Maine, United States. The population was 179 at the 2020 census.

== Geography ==
According to the United States Census Bureau, the town has a total area of 55.32 square miles (143.28 km^{2}), of which 50.09 square miles (129.73 km^{2}) is land and 5.23 square miles (13.55 km^{2}) is water.

=== Climate ===
This climatic region is typified by large seasonal temperature differences, with warm to hot (and often humid) summers and cold (sometimes severely cold) winters. According to the Köppen Climate Classification system, Topsfield has a humid continental climate, abbreviated "Dfb" on climate maps.

Climate data for Topsfield, Maine (1991–2020 normals, extremes 2000–present)
Month	Jan	Feb	Mar	Apr	May	Jun	Jul	Aug	Sep	Oct	Nov	Dec	Year
Record high °F (°C)	56 (13)	61 (16)	82 (28)	89 (32)	91 (33)	94 (34)	93 (34)	93 (34)	94 (34)	80 (27)	73 (23)	57 (14)	94 (34)
Mean maximum °F (°C)	47.5 (8.6)	46.3 (7.9)	54.7 (12.6)	73.3 (22.9)	84.3 (29.1)	86.4 (30.2)	88.7 (31.5)	87.7 (30.9)	83.7 (28.7)	72.6 (22.6)	60.9 (16.1)	51.5 (10.8)	90.4 (32.4)
Mean daily maximum °F (°C)	24.6 (−4.1)	29.1 (−1.6)	37.2 (2.9)	51.2 (10.7)	64.7 (18.2)	72.9 (22.7)	78.1 (25.6)	77.3 (25.2)	68.5 (20.3)	55.8 (13.2)	42.7 (5.9)	31.1 (−0.5)	52.8 (11.6)
Daily mean °F (°C)	15.6 (−9.1)	18.8 (−7.3)	27.4 (−2.6)	40.6 (4.8)	52.9 (11.6)	61.6 (16.4)	67.6 (19.8)	66.7 (19.3)	58.3 (14.6)	46.4 (8.0)	35.0 (1.7)	23.2 (−4.9)	42.8 (6.0)
Mean daily minimum °F (°C)	6.5 (−14.2)	8.6 (−13.0)	17.6 (−8.0)	30.0 (−1.1)	41.2 (5.1)	50.2 (10.1)	57.1 (13.9)	56.0 (13.3)	48.1 (8.9)	37.0 (2.8)	27.4 (−2.6)	15.4 (−9.2)	32.9 (0.5)
Mean minimum °F (°C)	−10.7 (−23.7)	−7.9 (−22.2)	−0.8 (−18.2)	18.7 (−7.4)	30.7 (−0.7)	40.9 (4.9)	49.5 (9.7)	47.5 (8.6)	36.1 (2.3)	26.4 (−3.1)	12.5 (−10.8)	−2.6 (−19.2)	−12.5 (−24.7)
Record low °F (°C)	−21 (−29)	−24 (−31)	−11 (−24)	7 (−14)	26 (−3)	34 (1)	45 (7)	42 (6)	28 (−2)	20 (−7)	0 (−18)	−13 (−25)	−24 (−31)
Average precipitation inches (mm)	4.13 (105)	3.62 (92)	4.54 (115)	4.21 (107)	4.23 (107)	4.23 (107)	3.84 (98)	3.44 (87)	4.01 (102)	5.39 (137)	5.29 (134)	5.20 (132)	52.13 (1,324)
Average snowfall inches (cm)	23.6 (60)	27.4 (70)	19.6 (50)	9.6 (24)	0.8 (2.0)	0.0 (0.0)	0.0 (0.0)	0.0 (0.0)	0.0 (0.0)	1.0 (2.5)	8.4 (21)	24.3 (62)	114.7 (291)
Average extreme snow depth inches (cm)	20.5 (52)	26.1 (66)	27.1 (69)	14.5 (37)	0.5 (1.3)	0.0 (0.0)	0.0 (0.0)	0.0 (0.0)	0.0 (0.0)	1.5 (3.8)	7.5 (19)	13.0 (33)	30.0 (76)
Average precipitation days (≥ 0.01 in)	11.7	11.7	11.6	13.2	14.5	14.2	12.7	11.1	10.2	12.6	11.9	14.1	149.5
Average snowy days (≥ 0.1 in)	9.6	10.2	8.4	3.5	0.1	0.0	0.0	0.0	0.0	0.8	3.6	9.5	45.7
Source: NOAA (mean maxima/minima, snow depth 2006–2020)

== Demographics ==
Historical population
Census	Pop.	Note	%±
1840	188		—
1850	268		42.6%
1860	444		65.7%
1870	463		4.3%
1880	440		−5.0%
1890	375		−14.8%
1900	282		−24.8%
1910	259		−8.2%
1920	272		5.0%
1930	224		−17.6%
1940	221		−1.3%
1950	231		4.5%
1970	177		—
1980	240		35.6%
1990	235		−2.1%
2000	225		−4.3%
2010	237		5.3%
2020	179		−24.5%
U.S. Decennial Census

=== 2010 census ===
As of the census of 2010, there were 237 people, 95 households, and 74 families living in the town. The population density was 4.7 inhabitants per square mile (1.8/km^{2}). There were 195 housing units at an average density of 3.9 per square mile (1.5/km^{2}). The racial makeup of the town was 99.2% White, 0.4% Native American, and 0.4% from other races.

There were 95 households, of which 28.4% had children under the age of 18 living with them, 65.3% were married couples living together, 6.3% had a female householder with no husband present, 6.3% had a male householder with no wife present, and 22.1% were non-families. 20.0% of all households were made up of individuals, and 6.3% had someone living alone who was 65 years of age or older. The average household size was 2.49 and the average family size was 2.81.

The median age in the town was 49.3 years. 21.1% of residents were under the age of 18; 4.3% were between the ages of 18 and 24; 19.9% were from 25 to 44; 36.6% were from 45 to 64; and 18.1% were 65 years of age or older. The gender makeup of the town was 53.6% male and 46.4% female.

=== 2000 census ===
As of the census of 2000, there were 225 people, 92 households, and 65 families living in the town. The population density was 4.4 people per square mile (1.7/km^{2}). There were 175 housing units at an average density of 3.5 per square mile (1.3/km^{2}). The racial makeup of the town was 98.22% White and 1.78% Native American.

There were 92 households, out of which 32.6% had children under the age of 18 living with them, 64.1% were married couples living together, 4.3% had a female householder with no husband present, and 28.3% were non-families. 25.0% of all households were made up of individuals, and 17.4% had someone living alone who was 65 years of age or older. The average household size was 2.45 and the average family size was 2.89.

In the town, the population was spread out, with 25.3% under the age of 18, 5.8% from 18 to 24, 25.8% from 25 to 44, 28.4% from 45 to 64, and 14.7% who were 65 years of age or older. The median age was 41 years. For every 100 females, there were 94.0 males. For every 100 females age 18 and over, there were 90.9 males.

The median income for a household in the town was $26,250, and the median income for a family was $31,875. Males had a median income of $30,833 versus $13,929 for females. The per capita income for the town was $14,456. About 10.4% of families and 13.5% of the population were below the poverty line, including 16.0% of those under the age of eighteen and 20.5% of those 65 or over.

== Education ==
According to the U.S. Census Bureau, Topsfield itself is not in a school district, and is counted as the school system of the "Washington Unorganized Territory" along with unorganized areas. The Maine Department of Education takes responsibility for coordinating school assignments in the unorganized territory.

East Range II CSD School, a K-8 school, of the East Range Community School District, is in Topsfield. That district is a part of the Eastern Maine Area School System (Alternative Organizational System 90). In 2023, it had 25 students. Teachers had certifications to teach all relevant grade levels, and their classrooms had students of different grades. Joyce Kryszak of The Maine Monitor described East Range II CSD as "a hub, taking students from several surrounding far-flung towns and unorganized territories".

In 1973 Topsfield had a grade 1-8 school of its own, Topsfield Elementary School, with high school students going to East Grand School and Lee Academy. In 1974 it was due to join the East Range school district. The former Topsfield school closed in 1976. Residents protested against a proposed demolition, and instead it became a town hall and community center.
