= Whiting, Maine =

- Town
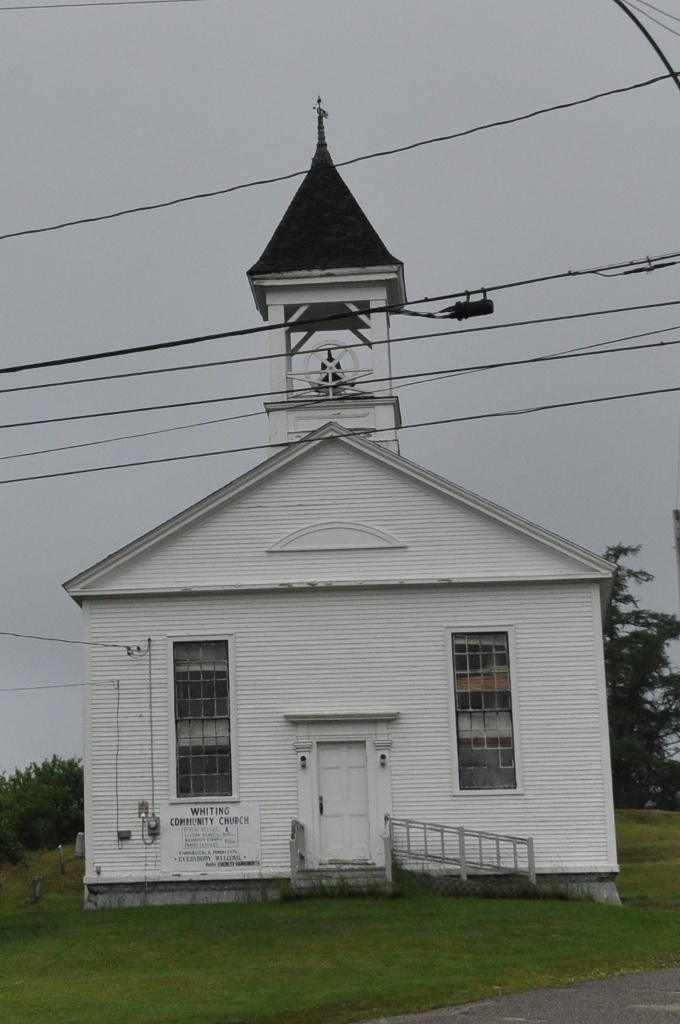
- The Union Meeting Hall

- Location within Maine Location within the United States
- Coordinates: 44°45′19″N 67°15′38″W
- Country: United States
- State: Maine
- County: Washington

Area
  - Total: 52.07 sq mi (134.86 km^{2})
  - Land: 46.74 sq mi (121.06 km^{2})
  - Water: 5.33 sq mi (13.80 km^{2})
- Elevation: 131 ft (40 m)

Population (2020)
  - Total: 482
  - Density: 10/sq mi (4/km^{2})
- Time zone: UTC-5 (Eastern (EST))
  - Summer (DST): UTC-4 (EDT)
- ZIP code: 04691
- Area code: 207
- FIPS code: 23-85185
- GNIS feature ID: 582812
- Website: www.whitingmaine.com

Whiting is a town in Washington County, Maine, United States. The town was named after Tate Whiting, an early settler. The population was 482 at the 2020 census. The town was originally known as Orangetown.

== Geography ==
According to the United States Census Bureau, the town has a total area of 52.07 square miles (134.86 km^{2}), of which 46.74 square miles (121.06 km^{2}) is land and 5.33 square miles (13.80 km^{2}) is water.

== Demographics ==
Historical population
Census	Pop.	Note	%±
1830	309		—
1840	462		49.5%
1850	470		1.7%
1860	479		1.9%
1870	414		−13.6%
1880	425		2.7%
1890	393		−7.5%
1900	399		1.5%
1910	368		−7.8%
1920	374		1.6%
1930	327		−12.6%
1940	358		9.5%
1950	354		−1.1%
1960	339		−4.2%
1970	269		−20.6%
1980	335		24.5%
1990	407		21.5%
2000	430		5.7%
2010	487		13.3%
2020	482		−1.0%
U.S. Decennial Census

=== 2010 census ===
As of the census of 2010, there were 487 people, 206 households, and 145 families living in the town. The population density was 10.4 inhabitants per square mile (4.0/km^{2}). There were 378 housing units at an average density of 8.1 per square mile (3.1/km^{2}). The racial makeup of the town was 93.6% White, 0.2% African American, 1.2% Native American, 2.3% Asian, 0.8% from other races, and 1.8% from two or more races. Hispanic or Latino of any race were 1.2% of the population.

There were 206 households, of which 27.2% had children under the age of 18 living with them, 59.2% were married couples living together, 6.8% had a female householder with no husband present, 4.4% had a male householder with no wife present, and 29.6% were non-families. 24.3% of all households were made up of individuals, and 8.7% had someone living alone who was 65 years of age or older. The average household size was 2.36 and the average family size was 2.78.

The median age in the town was 48 years. 21.1% of residents were under the age of 18; 6.3% were between the ages of 18 and 24; 17.1% were from 25 to 44; 40.8% were from 45 to 64; and 15% were 65 years of age or older. The gender makeup of the town was 49.5% male and 50.5% female.

=== 2000 census ===
As of the census of 2000, there were 430 people, 181 households, and 116 families living in the town. The population density was 9.2 people per square mile (3.5/km^{2}). There were 342 housing units at an average density of 7.3 per square mile (2.8/km^{2}). The racial makeup of the town was 98.14% White, 0.70% Native American, 0.23% Asian, and 0.93% from two or more races. Hispanic or Latino of any race were 0.23% of the population.

There were 181 households, out of which 24.3% had children under the age of 18 living with them, 59.1% were married couples living together, 3.9% had a female householder with no husband present, and 35.4% were non-families. 28.7% of all households were made up of individuals, and 12.2% had someone living alone who was 65 years of age or older. The average household size was 2.34 and the average family size was 2.87.

In the town, the population was spread out, with 20.9% under the age of 18, 6.7% from 18 to 24, 25.6% from 25 to 44, 29.5% from 45 to 64, and 17.2% who were 65 years of age or older. The median age was 43 years. For every 100 females, there were 110.8 males. For every 100 females age 18 and over, there were 106.1 males.

The median income for a household in the town was $28,304, and the median income for a family was $35,673. Males had a median income of $25,625 versus $18,750 for females. The per capita income for the town was $13,771. About 15.3% of families and 22.2% of the population were below the poverty line, including 36.6% of those under age 18 and 11.4% of those age 65 or over.

== Economy ==
Whiting has several small businesses, including a village store and doctor's office, along with several small contractors, such as a plumber and a forester.

== Education ==
It is in the Whiting School District. Whiting Village Elementary School is a part of the Alternative Organizational System 96.

== Notable inhabitants ==
- Lorne Michaels (b. 1944), Canadian-born American TV and film producer, comedian, screenwriter, and director, best known as the creator and producer of Saturday Night Live
