= Beddington, Maine =

Town in Maine, United States

- Town
- Location within Maine Location within the United States
- Coordinates: 44°48′52″N 67°59′28″W
- Country: United States
- State: Maine
- County: Washington

Area
  - Total: 37.86 sq mi (98.06 km^{2})
  - Land: 34.59 sq mi (89.59 km^{2})
  - Water: 3.27 sq mi (8.47 km^{2})
- Elevation: 318 ft (97 m)

Population (2020)
  - Total: 60
  - Density: 1.8/sq mi (0.7/km^{2})
- Time zone: UTC-5 (Eastern (EST))
  - Summer (DST): UTC-4 (EDT)
- ZIP code: 04622
- Area code: 207
- FIPS code: 23-03810
- GNIS feature ID: 582346
- Website: beddingtonmaine.org

Beddington is a town in Washington County, Maine, United States. The population was 60 at the 2020 census. It is the third-smallest organized town in Maine after Frye Island and Frenchboro.

Salmon migrate upstream to spawn in the town's rivers and lakes, which are part of their migration route. The majority of the town consists of blueberry fields.

== Geography ==
According to the United States Census Bureau, the town has a total area of 37.86 square miles (98.06 km^{2}), of which 34.59 square miles (89.59 km^{2}) is land and 3.27 square miles (8.47 km^{2}) is water. Lead Mountain is located north of the town.

== Demographics ==
Historical population
Census	Pop.	Note	%±
1840	164		—
1850	147		−10.4%
1860	144		−2.0%
1870	134		−6.9%
1880	129		−3.7%
1890	184		42.6%
1900	86		−53.3%
1910	58		−32.6%
1920	40		−31.0%
1930	35		−12.5%
1940	31		−11.4%
1950	26		−16.1%
1960	14		−46.2%
1970	32		128.6%
1980	36		12.5%
1990	43		19.4%
2000	29		−32.6%
2010	50		72.4%
2020	60		20.0%
U.S. Decennial Census

=== 2010 census ===
As of the census of 2010, there were 50 people, 28 households, and 15 families living in the town. The population density was 1.4 inhabitants per square mile (0.5/km^{2}). There were 321 housing units at an average density of 9.3 per square mile (3.6/km^{2}). The racial makeup of the town was 94.0% White, 2.0% Asian, and 4.0% from other races.

There were 28 households, of which 10.7% had children under the age of 18 living with them, 50.0% were married couples living together, 3.6% had a female householder with no husband present, and 46.4% were non-families. 32.1% of all households were made up of individuals, and 10.7% had someone living alone who was 65 years of age or older. The average household size was 1.79 and the average family size was 2.13.

The median age in the town was 57.7 years. 6% of residents were under the age of 18; 0.0% were between the ages of 18 and 24; 10% were from 25 to 44; 64% were from 45 to 64; and 20% were 65 years of age or older. The gender makeup of the town was 56.0% male and 44.0% female.

=== 2000 census ===
As of the census of 2000, there were 29 people, 16 households, and 7 families living in the town. The population density was 0.8 inhabitants per square mile (0.31/km^{2}). There were 253 housing units at an average density of 7.3 per square mile (2.8/km^{2}). The racial makeup of the town was 96.55% White, and 3.45% from two or more races.

There were 16 households, out of which 6.3% had children under the age of 18 living with them, 43.8% were married couples living together, and 56.3% were non-families. 37.5% of all households were made up of individuals, and 12.5% had someone living alone who was 65 years of age or older. The average household size was 1.81 and the average family size was 2.43.

In the town, the population was spread out, with 6.9% under the age of 18, 6.9% from 25 to 44, 75.9% from 45 to 64, and 10.3% who were 65 years of age or older. The median age was 51 years. For every 100 females, there were 141.7 males. For every 100 females age 18 and over, there were 170.0 males.

The median income for a household in the town was $24,375, and the median income for a family was $33,750. Males had a median income of $51,250 versus $21,250 for females. The per capita income for the town was $20,180. None of the population and none of the families were below the poverty line.
