= Washington County, Maine =

County in Maine, United States

- County
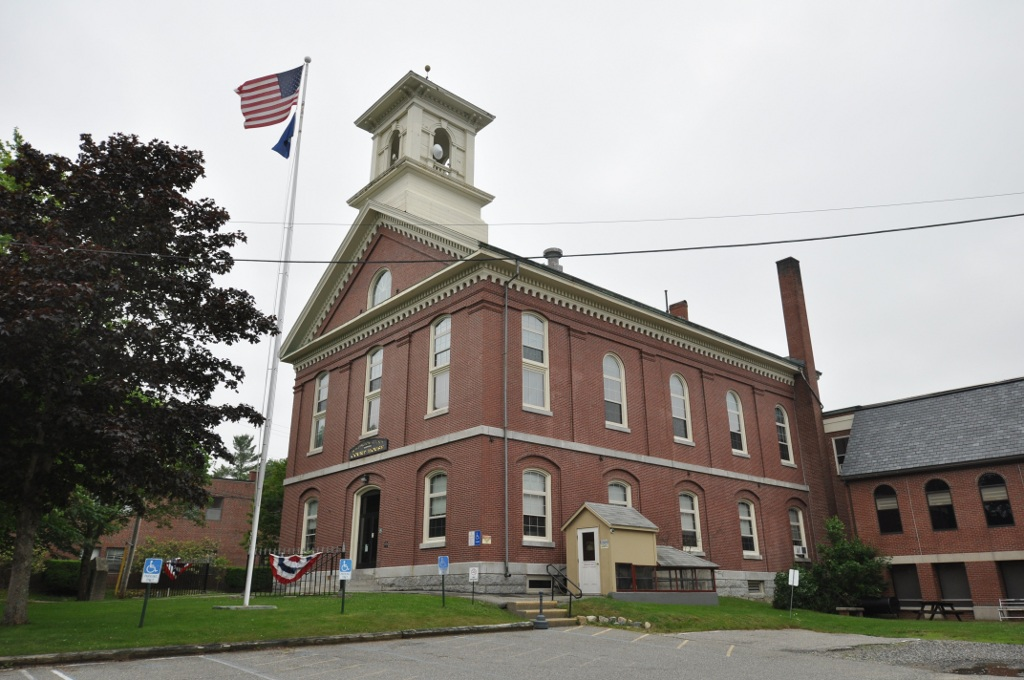
- Washington County Courthouse

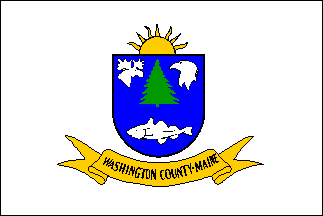
- Flag

- Location within the U.S. state of Maine
- Coordinates: 44°56′24″N 67°33′01″W
- Country: United States
- State: Maine
- Founded: June 25, 1789
- Named for: George Washington
- Seat: Machias
- Largest city: Calais

Area
  - Total: 3,258 sq mi (8,440 km^{2})
  - Land: 2,563 sq mi (6,640 km^{2})
  - Water: 695 sq mi (1,800 km^{2}) 21%

Population (2020)
  - Total: 31,095
  - Estimate (2025): 31,934 ▲
  - Density: 12.13/sq mi (4.684/km^{2})
- Time zone: UTC−5 (Eastern)
  - Summer (DST): UTC−4 (EDT)
- Congressional district: 2nd
- Website: washingtoncountymaine.com

Washington County is a county located in the U.S. state of Maine. As of the 2020 census, its population was 31,095, making it the third-least populous county in Maine. Its county seat is Machias. The county was established on June 25, 1789. It borders the Canadian province of New Brunswick. It is sometimes referred to as "Sunrise County" because it includes the easternmost point in the 48 contiguous United States. Claims have been made that Washington County is where the sun first rises on the 48 contiguous states. Many small seaside communities have small-scale fishing-based economies. Tourism is also important along the county's shoreline, but it is not as important as elsewhere in the state. The blueberry crop plays a major role in the county's economy.

== Geography ==
According to the U.S. Census Bureau, the county has a total area of 3,258 square miles (8,440 km^{2}), of which 2,563 square miles (6,640 km^{2}) is land and 695 square miles (1,800 km^{2}) (21%) is water.

=== Adjacent counties ===
- Hancock County – southwest
- Penobscot County – northwest
- Aroostook County – northwest
- York County, New Brunswick, Canada – northeast
- Charlotte County, New Brunswick, Canada – east

=== National protected areas ===
- Cross Island National Wildlife Refuge
- Moosehorn National Wildlife Refuge
- Petit Manan National Wildlife Refuge
- Saint Croix Island International Historic Site

=== Major highways ===
- US 1
- US 1A
- SR 6
- SR 9
- SR 187
- SR 191
- SR 192
- SR 193

== Demographics ==
Historical population
Census	Pop.	Note	%±
1790	2,760		—
1800	4,461		61.6%
1810	7,870		76.4%
1820	12,744		61.9%
1830	21,294		67.1%
1840	28,327		33.0%
1850	38,811		37.0%
1860	42,534		9.6%
1870	43,343		1.9%
1880	44,484		2.6%
1890	44,482		0.0%
1900	45,232		1.7%
1910	42,905		−5.1%
1920	41,709		−2.8%
1930	37,826		−9.3%
1940	37,767		−0.2%
1950	35,187		−6.8%
1960	32,908		−6.5%
1970	29,859		−9.3%
1980	34,963		17.1%
1990	35,308		1.0%
2000	33,941		−3.9%
2010	32,856		−3.2%
2020	31,095		−5.4%
2025 (est.)	31,334	▲	0.8%
U.S. Decennial Census; 1790–1960 1900–1990; 1990–2000 2010–2016

=== 2020 census ===
As of the 2020 census, the county had a population of 31,095. Of the residents, 18.3% were under the age of 18 and 26.1% were 65 years of age or older; the median age was 49.4 years. For every 100 females there were 97.6 males, and for every 100 females age 18 and over there were 95.4 males. 0.0% of residents lived in urban areas and 100.0% lived in rural areas.

The racial makeup of the county was 89.4% White, 0.5% Black or African American, 4.5% American Indian and Alaska Native, 0.4% Asian, 0.0% Native Hawaiian and Pacific Islander, 0.9% from some other race, and 4.2% from two or more races. Hispanic or Latino residents of any race comprised 2.1% of the population.

There were 13,757 households in the county, of which 23.4% had children under the age of 18 living with them and 26.5% had a female householder with no spouse or partner present. About 32.1% of all households were made up of individuals and 16.7% had someone living alone who was 65 years of age or older.

There were 21,594 housing units, of which 36.3% were vacant. Among occupied housing units, 76.8% were owner-occupied and 23.2% were renter-occupied. The homeowner vacancy rate was 3.1% and the rental vacancy rate was 9.3%.

Washington County, Maine – Racial and ethnic composition Note: the US Census treats Hispanic/Latino as an ethnic category. This table excludes Latinos from the racial categories and assigns them to a separate category. Hispanics/Latinos may be of any race.
Race / Ethnicity (NH = Non-Hispanic)	Pop 2000	Pop 2010	Pop 2020	% 2000	% 2010	% 2020
White alone (NH)	31,640	29,998	27,587	93.22%	91.30%	88.71%
Black or African American alone (NH)	79	132	156	0.23%	0.40%	0.50%
Native American or Alaska Native alone (NH)	1,489	1,586	1,381	4.38%	4.82%	4.44%
Asian alone (NH)	101	148	121	0.29%	0.45%	0.38%
Pacific Islander alone (NH)	3	5	7	0.00%	0.01%	0.02%
Other race alone (NH)	8	22	86	0.02%	0.06%	0.27%
Mixed race or Multiracial (NH)	347	513	1,090	1.02%	1.56%	3.50%
Hispanic or Latino (any race)	274	452	667	0.80%	1.37%	2.14%
Total	33,941	32,856	31,095	100.00%	100.00%	100.00%

=== 2022 population density ===
According to U.S. Census Bureau 2022 statistics, Washington County's population density equates to twelve people per square mile.

=== 2010 census ===
As of the 2010 United States census, there were 32,856 people, 14,302 households, and 8,847 families living in the county. The population density was 12.8 inhabitants per square mile (4.9/km^{2}). There were 23,001 housing units at an average density of 9.0 units per square mile (3.5 units/km^{2}). The racial makeup of the county was 92.1% white, 4.9% American Indian, 0.5% Asian, 0.4% black or African American, 0.4% from other races, and 1.7% from two or more races. Those of Hispanic or Latino origin made up 1.4% of the population. In terms of ancestry, 30.4% were English, 17.0% were Irish, 7.0% were German, 6.1% were Scottish, and 5.6% were American.

Of the 14,302 households, 25.9% had children under the age of 18 living with them, 47.1% were married couples living together, 9.6% had a female householder with no husband present, 38.1% were non-families, and 31.6% of all households were made up of individuals. The average household size was 2.24 and the average family size was 2.76. The median age was 46.1 years.

The median income for a household in the county was $34,859 and the median income for a family was $43,612. Males had a median income of $35,981 versus $27,336 for females. The per capita income for the county was $19,401. About 14.1% of families and 19.8% of the population were below the poverty line, including 29.3% of those under age 18 and 12.4% of those age 65 or over.

=== 2000 census ===
As of the census of 2000, there were 33,941 people, 14,118 households, and 9,303 families living in the county. The population density was 13 people per square mile (5.0 people/km^{2}). There were 21,919 housing units at an average density of 8 per square mile (3.1/km^{2}). The racial makeup of the county was 93.48% White, 0.26% Black or African American, 4.43% Native American, 0.30% Asian, 0.01% Pacific Islander, 0.44% from other races, and 1.07% from two or more races. 0.81% of the population were Hispanic or Latino of any race. 95.0% spoke English, 1.9% Passamaquoddy, 1.0% Spanish and 1.0% French as their first language.

There were 14,118 households, out of which 28.00% had children under the age of 18 living with them, 52.10% were married couples living together, 9.50% had a female householder with no husband present, and 34.10% were non-families. 28.30% of all households were made up of individuals, and 13.10% had someone living alone who was 65 years of age or older. The average household size was 2.34 and the average family size was 2.84.

In the county, the population was spread out, with 22.90% under the age of 18, 8.00% from 18 to 24, 26.30% from 25 to 44, 25.60% from 45 to 64, and 17.30% who were 65 years of age or older. The median age was 40 years. For every 100 females there were 95.50 males. For every 100 females age 18 and over, there were 93.90 males.

The median income for a household in the county was $25,869, and the median income for a family was $31,657. Males had a median income of $28,347 versus $20,074 for females. The per capita income for the county was $14,119. About 14.20% of families and 19.00% of the population were below the poverty line, including 22.40% of those under age 18 and 19.20% of those age 65 or over.

== Government ==
Washington County is considered to be a more conservative county in Maine. No Democrat has carried a majority of the county since Hubert Humphrey in 1968. In 2004, it was one of only two counties (the other being Piscataquis County) in Maine to vote for Republican George W. Bush over Democrat John Kerry. The county voted for the winning presidential candidate in every election from 1980 until 2020, when the county was carried by Donald Trump, who lost nationally to Joe Biden. In 2024, the county shifted to the right again, with Trump breaking 60% of the vote for the Republican Party for the first time since 1984.

In the 2012 Maine Republican presidential caucuses, the majority of Washington County voters cast their votes for Republican Ron Paul, but votes from Washington County were not counted because of snow. Mitt Romney ultimately won the state by a narrow margin.

=== Voter registration ===
Voter registration and party enrollment as of March 2024
Republican	8,027	38.53%
Unenrolled	6,072	29.15%
Democratic	5,591	26.84%
Green Independent	752	3.61%
No Labels	314	1.51%
Libertarian	76	0.36%
Total	20,832	100%

United States presidential election results for Washington County, Maine
Year	Republican		Democratic		Third party(ies)	
Year	No.	%	No.	%	No.	%
1908	3,507	59.49%	2,256	38.27%	132	2.24%
1912	1,862	26.40%	3,178	45.07%	2,012	28.53%
1916	3,891	52.24%	3,459	46.44%	99	1.33%
1920	6,768	68.57%	2,997	30.36%	105	1.06%
1924	6,010	69.71%	2,106	24.43%	505	5.86%
1928	8,531	73.30%	3,073	26.40%	35	0.30%
1932	7,507	51.95%	6,829	47.26%	115	0.80%
1936	6,387	44.06%	7,925	54.67%	183	1.26%
1940	6,253	43.65%	8,048	56.18%	25	0.17%
1944	5,380	48.44%	5,709	51.40%	18	0.16%
1948	5,130	58.64%	3,538	40.44%	80	0.91%
1952	7,396	65.89%	3,806	33.91%	23	0.20%
1956	8,181	76.20%	2,555	23.80%	0	0.00%
1960	9,118	65.91%	4,716	34.09%	0	0.00%
1964	3,816	29.05%	9,312	70.88%	9	0.07%
1968	5,523	46.10%	6,249	52.16%	208	1.74%
1972	7,820	67.57%	3,742	32.33%	12	0.10%
1976	7,039	49.45%	6,644	46.67%	552	3.88%
1980	7,180	48.55%	6,050	40.91%	1,558	10.54%
1984	9,713	64.41%	5,308	35.20%	60	0.40%
1988	7,872	56.93%	5,831	42.17%	125	0.90%
1992	5,493	30.92%	6,284	35.37%	5,988	33.71%
1996	4,793	31.56%	7,198	47.39%	3,198	21.05%
2000	7,958	50.66%	6,701	42.66%	1,049	6.68%
2004	8,619	49.79%	8,391	48.47%	300	1.73%
2008	8,077	48.50%	8,246	49.51%	331	1.99%
2012	7,550	47.68%	7,803	49.27%	483	3.05%
2016	9,093	55.56%	6,075	37.12%	1,197	7.31%
2020	10,194	58.73%	6,761	38.95%	402	2.32%
2024	11,001	60.96%	6,763	37.48%	282	1.56%

== Communities ==
=== Cities ===
- Calais
- Eastport

=== Towns ===
- Addison
- Alexander
- Baileyville
- Beals
- Beddington
- Charlotte
- Cherryfield
- Columbia
- Columbia Falls
- Cooper
- Crawford
- Cutler
- Danforth
- Deblois
- Dennysville
- East Machias
- Harrington
- Jonesboro
- Jonesport
- Lubec
- Machias (county seat)
- Machiasport
- Marshfield
- Meddybemps
- Milbridge
- Northfield
- Pembroke
- Perry
- Princeton
- Robbinston
- Roque Bluffs
- Steuben
- Talmadge
- Topsfield
- Vanceboro
- Waite
- Wesley
- Whiting
- Whitneyville

=== Plantations ===
- Baring Plantation
- Grand Lake Stream Plantation

=== Unorganized territories ===
- East Central Washington
- North Washington

=== Indian reservations ===
- Passamaquoddy Pleasant Point Reservation
- Passamaquoddy Indian Township Reservation

=== Census-designated places ===
- Danforth
- Jonesport
- Lubec
- Machias
- Milbridge
- Vanceboro
- Woodland

== Public transportation ==
Washington County does not have a comprehensive public transportation system, despite having a year-round population of around 32,000. West Bus Services, based in Milbridge, serves several communities in northern Maine. The daily Coastal Connection route serves: Calais, Perry, Pembroke, Dennysville, Whiting, Lubec, East Machias, Machias, Jonesboro, Jonesport, Beals, Addison, Cherryfield, Columbia, Columbia Falls, Deblois (seasonal), Township 18 (seasonal), Township 19 (seasonal), Centerville, Gouldsboro, Winter Harbor, Sullivan, Steuben, Hancock, Ellsworth, Lucern, Holden and Bangor. The route takes around 3.5 hours. On the first Wednesday of each month, a return service runs between Lubec and Machias.

== Education ==
School districts include:

K-12 districts:

- Alexander School District
- Baileyville School District
- Baring Plantation School District
- Beddington School District
- Calais School District
- Charlotte School District
- Cherryfield School District
- Cooper School District
- Crawford School District
- Cutler School District
- Deblois School District
- Dennysville School District
- East Machias School District
- East Range II Community School District
- Eastport School District
- Great Lake Stream Plantation School District
- Indian Township School District
- Jonesboro School District
- Machias School District
- Machiasport School District
- Marshfield School District
- Meddybemps School District
- Northfield School District
- Pembroke School District
- Perry School District
- Pleasant Point School District
- Princeton School District
- Regional School Unit 24
- Robbinston School District
- Roque Bluffs School District
- School Administrative District 14
- School Administrative District 19
- School Administrative District 37
- Talmadge School District
- Vanceboro School District
- Waite School District
- Wesley School District
- Whiting School District
- Whitneyville School District

Secondary school districts:

- Moosabec Community School District

Elementary school districts:

- Beals School District
- Jonesport School District

A portion of the area is in the "Washington Unorganized Territory]". Unorganized territories are not in any municipality. The Maine Department of Education takes responsibility for coordinating school assignments in the unorganized territory. The department operates one school, Edmunds Consolidated School, in Edmunds Township.

Private schools:

- Washington Academy

== Notable people ==
- Jeremiah O'Brien, (1744-1818) Commander of the sloop Unity during the first naval battle of the Revolutionary War; Machias.
- Henry Plummer (1832–1864), Sheriff and outlaw leader of The Innocents, in Bannock, Montana, Idaho Territory, born and raised in Addison.
- Hiram Burnham (1814-1864), Civil War general; Cherryfield.
- Reuben L. Snowe (1866-1942), Maine state legislator; born in Danforth.
- Theodore Enslin (1925–2011), American poet; resident of Milbridge.
- Carl Willey (1931 - 2009), American professional baseball player; Cherryfield.
- Lyn Mikel Brown (b. 1956), American academic, author, feminist, and community activist; born in Vanceboro.
- Katie Aselton (b. 1978), American actress, film director and producer; born in Milbridge.
- Andrea Gibson (1975-2025), American poet and activist, appointed as Poet Laureate of Colorado in 2023, born and raised in Calais.

== See also ==
- Gardner Lake (Maine) – Lake in Washington County, Maine
- National Register of Historic Places listings in Washington County, Maine
