= List of school districts in Maine =

This is a list of school districts in Maine.

Public school systems in Maine are in several types of school administrative units: cities which have their own school departments, also known as cities with individual supervision; school administrative districts (SADs) typically made up of two or more cities who cooperatively provide education to all of their students; regional school units; community school districts (CSDs) in which two or more cities cooperate to provide education to some or sometimes all grade levels, unions of towns, in which two or more school administrative units share a common superintendent but are otherwise separate, and, in unorganized townships, also known as unorganized territory, schools which are run directly by the state.

The U.S. Census Bureau considers the city and town-controlled schools and the state-controlled schools in unorganized territory to not be individual governments, while the incorporated school districts, interstate school districts, school administrative districts, community school districts, Indian schools, and applied technology regions are individual governments.

The three Indian reservation school systems function as a union of towns.

== History ==
Circa 2007, Maine had 290 school districts. In June 2007, the Maine Legislature passed a law that stated that they should consolidate into about 80 school districts.

== School departments ==
School departments serve a single town or city. Some school systems may style themselves as a "school district," others as a "school department."

=== A–C ===
- Acton School Department
- Alexander School Department
- Andover School Department
- Appleton School Department
- Athens School Department
- Auburn School Department
- Augusta School Department
- Baileyville School Department
- Bangor School Department
- Bar Harbor School Department
- Baring Plantation School Department
- Beals School Department
- Beaver Cove School Department
- Beddington School Department
- Biddeford School Department
- Blue Hill School Department
- Bowerbank School Department
- Bremen School Department
- Brewer School Department
- Bridgewater School Department
- Brighton Plantation School Department
- Bristol School Department
- Brooklin School Department
- Brooksville School Department
- Brunswick School Department
- Burlington School Department
- Byron School Department
- Calais School Department
- Cape Elizabeth School Department
- Caratunk School Department
- Carrabassett Valley School Department
- Carroll Plantation School Department
- Castine School Department
- Caswell School Department
- Charlotte School Department
- Chebeague Island School Department
- Cherryfield School Department
- Cooper School Department
- Coplin Plantation School Department
- Cranberry Isles School Department
- Crawford School Department
- Cutler School Department

=== D–H ===
- Damariscotta School Department
- Dayton School Department
- Deblois School Department
- Dedham School Department
- Dennistown Plantation School Department
- Dennysville School Department
- Drew Plantation School Department
- Eagle Lake School Department
- East Machias School Department
- East Millinocket School Department
- Easton School Department
- Eastport School Department
- Edgecomb School Department
- Ellsworth School Department
- Eustis School Department
- Falmouth School Department
- Fayette School Department
- Frenchboro School Department
- Georgetown School Department
- Gilead School Department
- Glenburn School Department
- Glenwood Plantation School Department
- Gorham School Department
- Grand Isle School Department
- Grand Lake Stream Plantation School Department
- Greenbush School Department
- Greenville School Department
- Hancock School Department
- Harmony School Department
- Hermon School Department
- Highland Plantation School Department
- Hope School Department

=== I–O ===
- Isle au Haut School Department
- Islesboro School Department
- Jefferson School Department
- Jonesboro School Department
- Jonesport School Department
- Kingsburg Plantation School Department
- Kittery School Department
- Lake View Plantation School Department
- Lakeville School Department
- Lamoine School Department
- Lewiston School Department
- Limestone School Department
- Lincoln Plantation School Department
- Lincolnville School Department
- Lisbon School Department
- Long Island School Department
- Lowell School Department
- Machias School Department
- Machiasport School Department
- Macwahoc Plantation School Department
- Madawaska School Department
- Marshfield School Department
- Meddybemps School Department
- Medford School Department
- Medway School Department
- Milford School Department
- Millinocket School Department
- Minot School Department
- Monhegan Plantation School Department
- Moro Plantation School Department
- Mount Desert School Department
- Nashville Plantation School Department
- New Sweden School Department
- Newcastle School Department
- Nobleboro School Department
- Northfield School Department
- Northport School Department
- Orient School Department
- Orrington School Department
- Otis School Department

=== P–Z ===
- Pembroke School Department
- Penobscot School Department
- Perry School Department
- Pleasant Ridge Plantation School Department
- Portage Lake School Department
- Portland School Department
- Princeton School Department
- Reed Plantation School Department
- Robbinston School Department
- Rogue Bluff School Department
- Saco School Department
- Sanford School Department
- Scarborough School Department
- Sebago School Department
- Seboeis Plantation School Department
- Sedgwick School Department
- Shirley School Department
- South Bristol School Department
- South Portland School Department
- Southport School Department
- Southwest Harbor School Department
- St. George School Department
- Surry School Department
- Talmadge School Department
- The Forks Plantation School Department
- Tremont School Department
- Trenton School Department
- Upton School Department
- Vanceboro School Department
- Vassalboro School Department
- Veazie School Department
- Waite School Department
- Waterville School Department
- Wesley School Department
- West Bath School Department
- West Forks Plantation School Department
- Westbrook School Department
- Westmanland School Department
- Whiting School Department
- Whitneyville School Department
- Willimantic School Department
- Winslow School Department
- Winterville Plantation School Department
- Winthrop School Department
- Wiscasset School Department
- Woodland School Department
- Woodville School Department
- Yarmouth School Department
- York School Department

== School administrative districts ==
School administrative districts (SADs) are typically made up of two or more municipalities which cooperatively provide education to all of their students, with the resources of both or all merged together. As of 2021, 184 cities and towns were served by 52 SADs, numbered 1 to 76, with numbers 2, 5, 9, 18, 21, 22, 25, 26, 34, 36, 38, 39, 43, 47, 48, 50, 56, 62, 66, 67, 69, 71, and 73 skipped.

== Regional school units ==
Starting in 2008, smaller school districts around the state were required to combine into regional school units (RSUs) or pay a hefty penalty.

== Community school districts ==
Community school districts (CSDs) are systems in which two or more cities cooperate to provide education to some or sometimes all grade levels. They include:

- Airline Community School District – Amherst, Aurora, Great Pond, Osborn
- Boothbay-Boothbay Harbor Community School District – Boothbay, Boothbay Harbor
- Deer Isle-Stonington Community School District – Deer Isle, Stonington
- East Range Community School District – Topsfield
- Five Town Community School District – Appleton, Camden, Hope, Lincolnville, Rockport
- Great Salt Bay Community School District – Bremen, Damariscotta, Newcastle
- Moosabec Community School District – Beals, Jonesport
- Mount Desert Community School District – Bar Harbor, Mount Desert, Southwest Harbor, Tremont
- Wells-Ogunquit Community School District – Ogunquit, Wells

== Unions of towns ==
In unions of towns, two or more school administrative units share a common superintendent, but are otherwise separate. They include:

- School Union 60 – Beaver Cove, Greenville
- School Union 69 – Appleton, Hope, Lincolnville
- School Union 76 – Brooklin, Deer Isle, Sedgwick, Stonington
- School Union 93 – Blue Hill, Brooksville, Castine, Penobscot, Surry
- School Union 103 – Beals, Jonesport
- School Union 122 – New Sweden, Westmanland, Woodland

=== Indian schools ===
The three Indian reservation school systems function as a union of towns. A 1988 Maine Legislature document stated that the MIE is "organized exactly as a union of towns".

- Maine Indian Education (MIE) – Indian Island, Indian Township, and Pleasant Point reservations
  - Schools operated: Indian Island School, Indian Township School, Sipayik Elementary School (ex-Beatrice Rafferty School)

== Unorganized territory ==
Unorganized townships, also known as unorganized territory, are areas are not in any municipality. The state government is responsible for organizing education and having students assigned to schools. This includes the state directly operating schools in these areas. In 1988, seven schools were in unorganized areas.

As of 2025, the state-operated schools in unorganized territory are:

- Connor Consolidated School - Connor Township, Aroostook County
- Edmunds Consolidated School - Edmunds Township, Washington County
- Kingman Elementary School - Kingman, Penobscot County

The Maine Department of Education previously operated:

- Benedicta Elementary School in Benedicta Township, Aroostook County
- Brookton Elementary School in Brookton, Washington County - closed in 1995
- Patrick Therriault School in Sinclair Township, Aroostook County
- Rockwood Elementary School in Rockwood Township, Somerset County

As of 1998, these schools did not have their own school boards. In 2003, there were about 1,250 K-12 students in the unorganized territory, with about 1,000 being sent to area schools with tuition money, and about 250 attending schools directly operated by the Maine Department of Education.
