= Rena Newell =

American politician

Member of the Maine House of Representatives from the Passamaquoddy Tribe
- In office December 5, 2018 – October 1, 2022
- Preceded by: Matthew Dana
- Succeeded by: Aaron Dana

Personal details
- Party: Independent
- Spouse: Leslie West
- Children: 2
- Education: University of Maine (B.S.)

Rena D. Newell is a Passamaquoddy politician who is serving as the incumbent chief of the Passamaquoddy Tribe at Sipayik. Previously, she was the Passamaquoddy tribal representative to the Maine House of Representatives during the 129th and 130th legislatures. During her two terms, she was the only tribal representative in the Maine House.

== Maine House of Representatives ==
Newell identifies as a political independent. While in office, she served on the Judiciary Committee. Since the Penobscot and Maliseet tribes have opted not to send representatives to the legislature as of 2017 and 2019, respectively, Newell was the only tribal representative as of the 129th and 130th Maine Legislatures. Tribal representatives do not have a vote but can introduce and co-sponsor legislation relating to their tribes.

Newell advocated in favor of ending the use of Native Americans as mascots in Maine, and in May 2019 Governor Janet Mills signed a bill banning the use of Native American mascots in Maine public schools into law. Newell described the new law as a step toward "promoting cultural diversity and awareness” that would help Maine residents remember to treat each other as equals. In January 2020, Newell stood beside Mills as Mills announced a posthumous pardon for long-time tribal attorney Don Gellers.

In a December 2020 Maine Beacon piece highlighting positive events throughout the calendar year, Newell praised the formation of the Wabenaki Alliance, a group "dedicated to building political power and educating Mainers about the need for full recognition of tribal sovereignty." She explained that the policymaking, especially in the continued efforts of Maine's indigenous tribes to pursue tribal sovereignty, was a positive step for tribal relations with the state.

Newell has supported tribal sovereignty legislation as a step toward securing clean water for Passamaquoddy Pleasant Point Reservation; or Sipayik in the Malecite-Passamaquoddy language, whose drinking water has frequently contained unsafe levels of trihalomethanes since 1974. In February 2021, Newell introduced a proposal that would establish a permanent Wabanaki representative on the advisory council of the Maine Department of Inland Fisheries and Wildlife. She also testified in support of LD 2, "An Act To Require the Inclusion of Racial Impact Statements in the Legislative Process" in Maine, stating “From flooding our land to build dams, to killing our fisheries to build roads or cutting our lumber to put in state coffers, the historical record shows Maine government has a long history of enacting laws without regard to the cost of such policy in the communities I stand to represent.”

Newell was succeeded in the Maine House of Representatives by Aaron Dana.

== Passamaquoddy Government ==
In the September 8th, 2022 general election, Newell defeated incumbent chief Maggie Dana with 229 votes to Dana's 120 votes. Newell assumed office as chief of the Passamaquoddy Tribe at Sipayik on October 1, 2022.

== Personal life ==
Newell has a Bachelor of Science in business from the University of Maine at Machias and was the Passamaquoddy tribal education director. She has 2 children and 3 grandchildren.

== See also ==
- Passamaquoddy
- Passamaquoddy Pleasant Point Reservation
- Passamaquoddy Indian Township Reservation
- Wabanaki Confederacy
- Maine House of Representatives
