= USS Stephen W. Groves =

Oliver Hazard Perry–class frigate

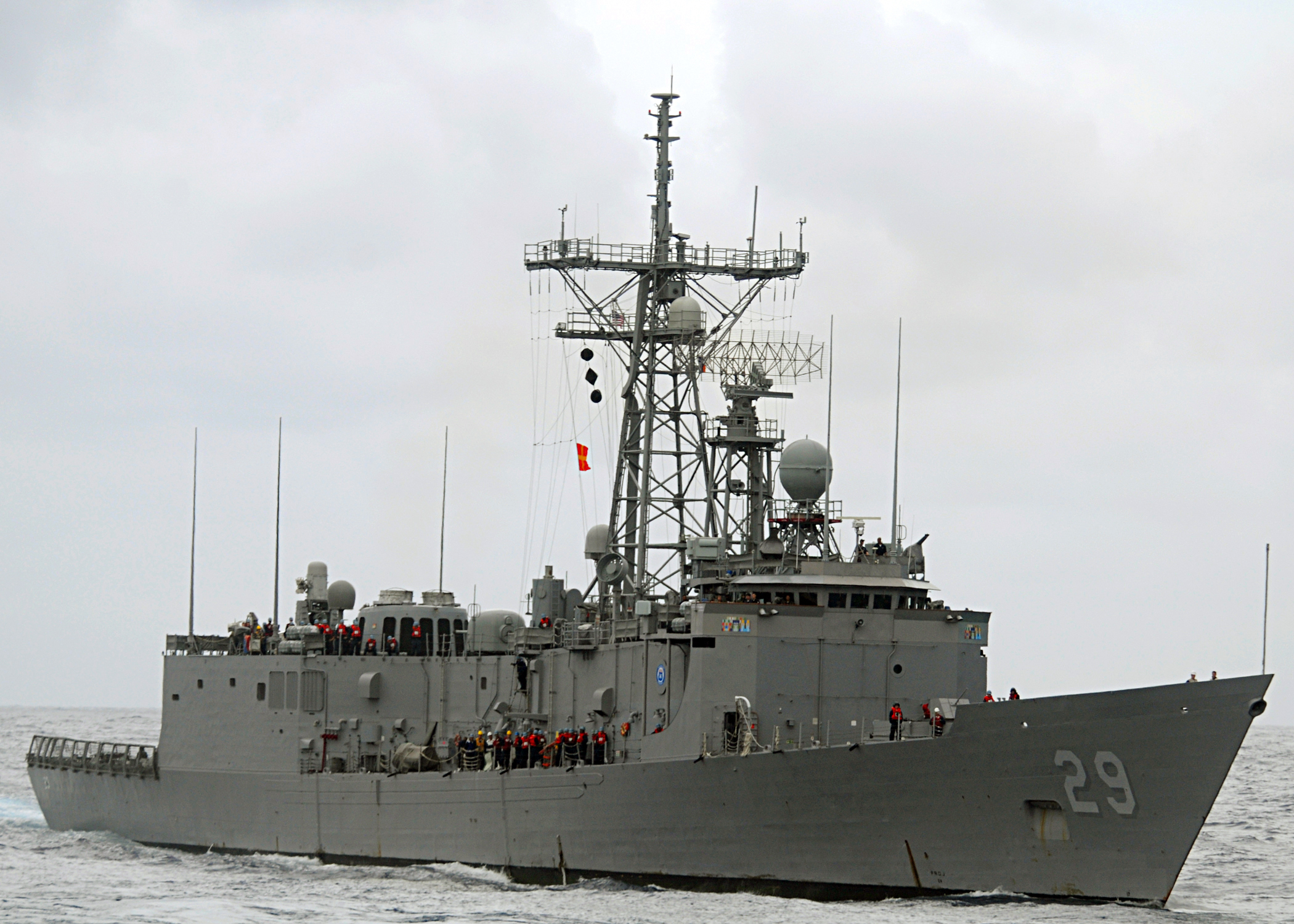
- USS Stephen W. Groves in the Atlantic Ocean in 2008

History

United States
- Name: Stephen W. Groves
- Namesake: Ensign Stephen W. Groves
- Awarded: 23 January 1978
- Builder: Bath Iron Works, Bath, Maine
- Laid down: 16 September 1980
- Launched: 4 April 1981
- Commissioned: 17 April 1982
- Decommissioned: 24 February 2012
- Home port: Mayport Naval Station
- Identification: Hull symbol:FFG-29; Code letters:NSWG
- Motto: Dirigo; (I Direct)
- Nickname(s): Stevie G
- Fate: Sold for scrap

General characteristics
- Class & type: Oliver Hazard Perry-class frigate
- Displacement: 4,100 long tons (4,200 t), full load
- Length: 453 feet (138 m), overall
- Beam: 45 feet (14 m)
- Draft: 22 feet (6.7 m)
- Propulsion: 2 × General Electric LM2500-30 gas turbines generating 41,000 shp (31 MW) through a single shaft and variable pitch propeller; 2 × Auxiliary Propulsion Units, 350 hp (260 kW) retractable electric azimuth thrusters for maneuvering and docking.
- Speed: over 29 knots (54 km/h)
- Range: 5,000 nautical miles at 18 knots (9,300 km at 33 km/h)
- Complement: 15 officers and 190 enlisted, plus SH-60 LAMPS detachment of roughly six officer pilots and 15 enlisted maintainers
- Sensors & processing systems: AN/SPS-49 air-search radar; AN/SPS-55 surface-search radar; CAS and STIR fire-control radar; AN/SQS-56 sonar.
- Electronic warfare & decoys: AN/SLQ-32
- Armament: As built: 1 × OTO Melara Mk 75 76 mm/62 caliber naval gun; 2 × Mk 32 triple-tube (324 mm) launchers for Mark 46 torpedoes; 1 × Vulcan Phalanx CIWS; 4 × .50-cal (12.7 mm) machine guns.; 1 × Mk 13 Mod 4 single-arm launcher for Harpoon anti-ship missiles and SM-1MR Standard anti-ship/air missiles (40 round magazine); Note: As of 2004, Mk 13 systems removed from all active US vessels of this class.
- Aircraft carried: 2 × SH-60 LAMPS III helicopters

USS Stephen W. Groves (FFG-29), twenty-first ship of the Oliver Hazard Perry-class of guided missile frigates, was named for Ensign Stephen W. Groves (1917–1942), a naval aviator who was posthumously awarded the Navy Cross for his heroism at the Battle of Midway during World War II.

== Namesake ==
Stephen William Groves was born on 29 January 1917 in Millinocket, Maine. He graduated from Schenck High School in East Millinocket, Maine, and received a mechanical engineering degree from the University of Maine in 1939.

He joined the U.S. Navy in December 1940 and was commissioned in August 1941. He joined the aircraft carrier USS Hornet in December 1941. During the Battle of Midway, took off nine times from USS Hornet, his was one of six American fighters that fought off a vastly superior Japanese force that was trying to finish off the damaged carrier USS Yorktown on 4 June 1942. The U.S. fighters were credited with shooting down 14 Japanese planes and causing six others to retreat.

Groves was declared missing and presumed dead on 5 June 1942. He was posthumously awarded the Navy Cross. The destroyer escort USS Groves (DE-543) was named for him, but its construction was cancelled in 1944. The American Legion Post in East Millinocket is named the Feeney-Groves Post, partially in his memory.

== Construction and career ==
Ordered from Bath Iron Works, Bath, Maine, on 23 January 1978 as part of the FY78 program, Stephen W. Groves was laid down on 16 September 1980, launched on 4 April 1981, and commissioned on 17 April 1982.

Stephen W. Groves (FFG-29) is the first ship of that name in the U.S. Navy. A previous ship named for Ensign Groves, destroyer escort, Groves (DE-543), was canceled in 1944 prior to completion. Assigned to Destroyer Squadron 14 and home-ported at Naval Station Mayport, Florida.

During her maiden voyage, Groves was assigned to units in support of US Marines stationed at the airport in Beirut, Lebanon. Arriving shortly after the barracks bombing in 1983, she was assigned to host the helicopter detachment from USS New Jersey, enabling New Jersey to utilize all three of her turrets for attacking targets in the Beqaa Valley. Additionally, Groves protected New Jersey and other surface units from air threats. She tracked unidentified submarines, monitored Yasser Arafat's transit from Beirut to Cyprus, and entered Beirut harbor with other units to conduct direct fire support against units hostile to USMC positions. Groves was awarded a Meritorious Unit Citation for these actions.

She was also on station when the frigate Stark was struck by two missiles from an Iraqi fighter jet, and assisted Stark in her return to Mayport, Florida.

In September 2003, while patrolling in the Eastern Pacific Stephen W. Groves captured a go-fast drug smuggling boat along with its six crewmembers. 1.5 tons of cocaine was recovered from the ocean after it had been dumped into the sea by the go-fast's crew.

On 28 August 2005, she sailed from her then-home port of Pascagoula, Mississippi, along with sister ship John L. Hall, under threat from Hurricane Katrina.

Deployed to the Indian Ocean, on 10 May 2011 she intercepted the Taiwanese longliner Jih Chun Tsai 68, which had been hijacked by Somalian pirates. Receiving fire from the fishing vessel, Stephen W. Groves engaged her in a single ship action that saw the pirate vessel sunk with three pirates killed, two wounded, and one Taiwanese hostage killed. Nineteen Somali pirates and two Chinese hostages were taken on board. The rescued Chinese crew were repatriated to China and their families. She was decommissioned on 24 February 2012 and was moved to Brownsville, Texas for deconstruction and recycling to be completed in 2021.

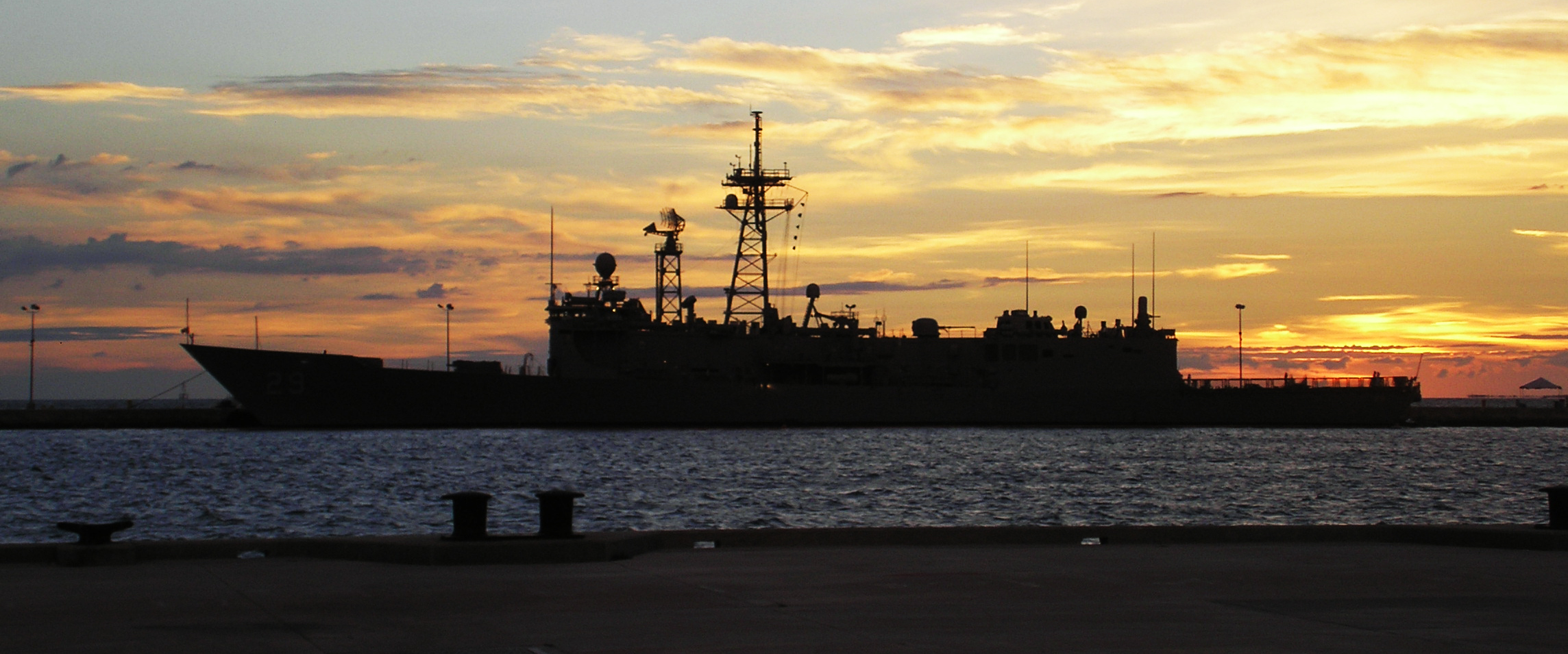
Stephen W. Groves as seen at sunset in Key West on 22 July 2007.
