= Passamaquoddy Reservation =

Passamaquoddy Reservation may refer to:

- Passamaquoddy Indian Township Reservation
- Passamaquoddy Pleasant Point Reservation
