= George W. Stearns High School =

Coordinates: 45.661342°N 68.70639°W

Stearns High School

Location
- 199 State Street; Millinocket, Maine 04462; United States

Information
- Other names: Stearns Junior/Senior High School
- School type: Public high school
- Established: 1923
- School district: Millinocket School Department
- NCES School ID: 230828000227
- Principal: Beth Peavey
- Teaching staff: 21.20 (FTE)
- Grades: 6–12
- Enrollment: 233 (2023–2024)
- Student to teacher ratio: 10.99
- Campus type: Rural Fringe
- Mascot: Minuteman
- Website: George W. Stearns High School

George W. Stearns High School (commonly Stearns High School, Stearns, or SHS) is a coeducational public secondary school in Millinocket, Maine, United States, and is part of the Millinocket School Department. It serves students in grades 6–12. The school is accredited by the New England Association of Schools and Colleges.

== History ==
In the 1970s the school had about 700 students.

As of the 2007-08 school year, the school had an enrollment of 326 students and had 27.9 classroom teachers (on an FTE basis), for a student-teacher ratio of 11.7.

=== International student program and Global Times controversy ===
By 2010 the enrollment had declined to about 200, and the school began experiencing budget shortfalls, prompting the school district administration to attempt to recruit international students. The school planned to have 25, and later, 60 international students. Kenneth Smith, the superintendent, planned the international student recruitment. The school district planned to charge $24,000 per student per year. It planned to use all of the Katahdin Inn as a dormitory for the students.

In June 2011 Patrick Mattimore, an adjunct instructor at Tsinghua/Temple Law School, wrote a negative editorial in the Chinese Communist Party tabloid Global Times about the school. Mattimore stated that a New York Times article provided the background information and that the editors of the Global Times had removed his credits to the NYT; Mattimore stated in a guest column for the Bangor Daily News "I wish the background had been credited." In response to his critics, Mattimore wrote in the column that the article tone was "a little more “Mattimore versus Millinocket” than I would have liked" because some of his material about unethical recruiters for U.S. universities and high schools had been removed, and Mattimore stated that he planned to visit Millinocket to clarify the situation.

Adam Minter, a U.S. journalist, asked Kenneth Smith and Eugene Conlogue, the town manager of Millinocket, to provide defenses against the Global Times article, and Minter posted a criticism and rebuttal of the Mattimore article. Kenneth Smith accused Mattimore of having "suspect" credentials. Max Fisher of The Atlantic accused the article of being a propaganda piece to discourage Chinese from sending their children to U.S. high schools.

After the Global Times incident, a recruiter who stated plans to provide 60 students for Stearns ultimately did not provide students. The school only had six international students for the 2011-2012 school year. The district stated that it would continue the international student program.

== Academics ==
In 2007, the percentage of 11th grade students meeting the reading proficiency standard was 32%, and meeting the math standard was 21%. Based on these results, it has received a GreatSchools rating of 3 out of 10.

The University of Maine offers support from The Bartley Family Scholarship Fund to a graduate of the high school majoring in English or forestry.

== Extracurricular activities ==
=== Athletics ===
Their teams are known as The Minutemen, and The Lady Minutemen. The school colors are royal blue and white. The complete list of sports offered are:

- Football (Fall)
- Field hockey (Fall)
- Boys' and girls' basketball (Winter)
- Baseball (Spring)
- Softball (Spring)

Some students from Schenck High School in the neighboring town of East Millinocket play in the Stearns football. Some Stearns students also play sports at Schenck as well, soccer (men's and women's) in the Fall, and tennis in the Spring.

==== Basketball ====
Stearns High School has a rich basketball history with notable achievements in both state and regional competitions, as well as several players who have been recognized for their outstanding performances.

The boys' basketball team has had significant success in state championships, particularly during the 1960s. Their games with the Morse High School team during the Class A State Championship are remembered to this day as Morse won the state championship while Stearns defeated Morse High School in a New England Championship game held at the Boston Garden, securing the title in a dramatic fashion.

For the Stearns High School boys' basketball state championship teams of 1964, 1965, 1968, and 1970, notable players include Terry Carr, who was instrumental during the 1963 season and contributed significantly to the culture of success that carried into the subsequent championship years. Carr's performance and leadership undoubtedly influenced these teams during his tenure and beyond, setting a standard and a strong foundation for Stearns' basketball program.

Terry Carr is one of Stearns' most famous players, contributing significantly to the team's success during his time. Carr was a standout player who was recognized with All-Maine honors and later had a successful college basketball career at the University of Maine. His performances in high school included leading his team to multiple undefeated seasons and a memorable run in the New England tournament.

Another notable player, Jon MacDonald, was recognized for his skills on the court with All-State and All-New England honors. MacDonald played a key role in Stearns' success in the early 1960s and later played for the University of Maryland.

For detailed listings of state championship games and outcomes across different classes, you can refer to the Maine Basketball Hall of Fame, which provides comprehensive records of these events.

These highlights from Stearns High School's basketball history illustrate the school's contributions to Maine's high school basketball.

Stearns High School girls’ basketball team has had its share of success, with state championships captured in the years 1988, and 1996. These victories highlight significant achievements and notable periods in the program’s history.

=== Unified Performing Arts ===
Activities in the Unified Performing Arts Department are:

- Concert band
- Jazz band
- Pep band
- Chorus
- Show choir
- Fall musical
- One act play

The Show Choir at Stearns is combined with the Show Choir at Schenck High School in East Millinocket, Maine as Unified Harmony. Together they won a state championship and the best choreography award in 2007, 2010, and 2011. They are also combined in Jazz Band, Pep Band, One Act, and Fall Musical. In One Act, they won 2nd place in the state behind Lisbon High School in 2019.
