= Woodville, Maine =

Town in Maine, United States

- Town
- Location within Maine Location within the United States
- Coordinates: 45°31′30″N 68°27′34″W
- Country: United States
- State: Maine
- County: Penobscot

Area
  - Total: 42.73 sq mi (110.67 km^{2})
  - Land: 42.73 sq mi (110.67 km^{2})
  - Water: 0 sq mi (0 km^{2})
- Elevation: 381 ft (116 m)

Population (2020)
  - Total: 201
  - Density: 4.7/sq mi (1.8/km^{2})
- Time zone: UTC-5 (Eastern (EST))
  - Summer (DST): UTC-4 (EDT)
- ZIP Code: 04457
- Area code: 207
- FIPS code: 23-87390
- GNIS feature ID: 582828

Woodville is a town in Penobscot County, Maine, United States. The population was 201 at the 2020 census.

== Geography ==
According to the United States Census Bureau, the town has a total area of 42.73 square miles (110.67 km^{2}), all land.

== Demographics ==
Historical population
Census	Pop.	Note	%±
1860	230		—
1870	170		−26.1%
1880	223		31.2%
1890	242		8.5%
1900	160		−33.9%
1910	125		−21.9%
1920	100		−20.0%
1930	115		15.0%
1940	133		15.7%
1950	91		−31.6%
1960	49		−46.2%
1970	62		26.5%
1980	226		264.5%
1990	215		−4.9%
2000	286		33.0%
2010	248		−13.3%
2020	201		−19.0%
U.S. Decennial Census

=== 2010 census ===
As of the census of 2010, there were 248 people, 100 households, and 78 families living in the town. The population density was 5.8 inhabitants per square mile (2.2/km^{2}). There were 137 housing units at an average density of 3.2 per square mile (1.2/km^{2}). The racial makeup of the town was 98.4% White and 1.6% from two or more races.

There were 100 households, of which 32.0% had children under the age of 18 living with them, 66.0% were married couples living together, 7.0% had a female householder with no husband present, 5.0% had a male householder with no wife present, and 22.0% were non-families. 18.0% of all households were made up of individuals, and 5% had someone living alone who was 65 years of age or older. The average household size was 2.48 and the average family size was 2.74.

The median age in the town was 44.8 years. 23% of residents were under the age of 18; 4.4% were between the ages of 18 and 24; 22.9% were from 25 to 44; 39.2% were from 45 to 64; and 10.5% were 65 years of age or older. The gender makeup of the town was 52.4% male and 47.6% female.

=== 2000 census ===
As of the census of 2000, there were 286 people, 103 households, and 80 families living in the town. The population density was 6.7 people per square mile (2.6/km^{2}). There were 125 housing units at an average density of 2.9 per square mile (1.1/km^{2}). The racial makeup of the town was 99.30% White, and 0.70% from two or more races.

There were 103 households, out of which 32.0% had children under the age of 18 living with them, 71.8% were married couples living together, 5.8% had a female householder with no husband present, and 21.4% were non-families. 16.5% of all households were made up of individuals, and 6.8% had someone living alone who was 65 years of age or older. The average household size was 2.78 and the average family size was 3.10.

In the town, the population was spread out, with 28.3% under the age of 18, 5.6% from 18 to 24, 26.6% from 25 to 44, 32.9% from 45 to 64, and 6.6% who were 65 years of age or older. The median age was 38 years. For every 100 females, there were 104.3 males. For every 100 females age 18 and over, there were 99.0 males.

The median income for a household in the town was $35,625, and the median income for a family was $38,125. Males had a median income of $41,250 versus $19,375 for females. The per capita income for the town was $15,491. About 8.7% of families and 7.3% of the population were below the poverty line, including 6.6% of those under the age of eighteen and none of those 65 or over.

== Education ==
East Millinocket Schools operates public schools serving the community: Opal Myrick Elementary School, Medway Middle School, and Schenck High School. Myrick and Schenck occupy one campus in East Millinocket while Medway Middle is in Medway.
