= WSYY =

WSYY may refer to:

- WSYY (AM), a radio station (1240 AM) licensed to Millinocket, Maine, United States
- WSYY-FM, a radio station (94.9 FM) licensed to Millinocket, Maine, United States
