= Orono High School =

Orono High School may refer to:

- Orono High School (Maine)
- Orono High School (Minnesota)
