= Mary Gabriel =

Mary Gabriel may refer to:

- Mary Gabriel Martyn (1604–1672), Abbess of the Poor Clares of Galway
- Virginia Gabriel (Mary Ann Virginia Gabriel, 1825–1877), English composer
- Muriel Barron (1904–1988), known as Sister Mary Gabriel, New Zealand nun and pharmacist
- Mary Gabriel (author) (born 1955), American author
- Mary Mitchell Gabriel (1908–2004), Passamaquoddy basket maker
