= Chad Hayes =

Chad Hayes may refer to:

- Chad Hayes (American football) (born 1979), American football player
- Chad Hayes (writer) (born 1961), American writer
