= Douglas Thomas (Maine politician) =

American politician and businessperson

Member of the Maine Senate from the 27th district
- In office 2010–2018
- Preceded by: Douglas Smith

Personal details
- Party: Republican
- Spouse(s): Darlene; 6 children
- Profession: Businessperson
- Website: Official Website

Douglas A. Thomas is an American politician and businessperson. Thomas is former a Republican State Senator from Maine's 27th District, representing parts of Piscataquis, Somerset, and Penobscot counties, including the population centers of Dover-Foxcroft and Millinocket.

He represented the towns of Athens, Harmony, Ripley, Dexter, Garland and Charleston in the Maine House of Representatives.

== Electoral history ==
Thomas was first elected to the Maine State Senate in 2010, when he replaced fellow Republican Douglas Smith, who chose not to run for re-election. In November 2012, Thomas defeated Democratic Representative Herbert E. Clark of Millinocket and won re-election to a second term. In June 2014, Thomas lost a contested primary to former State Senator Paul Davis. The primary for the Republican nomination received statewide attention because of negative campaigning by both campaigns. Thomas received 42.29% of the vote.
