= USS Groves =

History

United States
- Name: USS Groves
- Namesake: Ensign Stephen W. Groves (1917-1942), U.S. Navy officer and Navy Cross recipient
- Builder: Boston Navy Yard, Boston, Massachusetts
- Laid down: date unknown
- Launched: Never
- Commissioned: Never
- Fate: Construction contract cancelled 5 September 1944; Scrapped incomplete

General characteristics
- Class & type: John C. Butler-class destroyer escort
- Displacement: 1,350 tons
- Length: 306 ft (93 m)
- Beam: 36 ft 8 in (11 m)
- Draft: 9 ft 5 in (3 m)
- Propulsion: 2 boilers, 2 geared turbine engines, 12,000 shp; 2 propellers
- Speed: 24 knots (44 km/h)
- Range: 6,000 nmi. (12,000 km) @ 12 kt
- Complement: 14 officers, 201 enlisted
- Armament: 2 × single 5 in (127 mm) guns; 2 × twin 40 mm (1.6 in) AA guns; 10 × single 20 mm (0.79 in) AA guns; 1 × triple 21 in (533 mm) torpedo tubes; 8 × depth charge throwers; 1 × Hedgehog ASW mortar; 2 × depth charge racks

USS Groves (DE-543) was a proposed World War II United States Navy John C. Butler-class destroyer escort that was never completed.

Groves was laid down at the Boston Navy Yard in Boston, Massachusetts. Her construction was cancelled on 5 September 1944 before she could be launched. The incomplete ship was scrapped.
