= Melvin Francis =

Passamaquoddy Pleasant Point Reservation governor

Melvin Joseph Francis (August 6, 1945 – January 12, 2006) was the governor of the Passamaquoddy Pleasant Point Reservation, one of two reservations in Maine of the Passamaquoddy Indian tribe, from 1980 until 1990 and again from 2002 until his death.

Born and raised in Pleasant Point, he attended local schools. After graduating from Shead High School he earned a journeyman's certificate and specialized in carpentry. He spoke the Passamaquoddy language and was engaged in the preservation of his communities' traditions. But alike in the betterment of living conditions for his people as a devoted advocate, peacemaker and lending his professional skills were needed. As governor he strongly supported a proposed LNG terminal on tribal land and legislation allowing an Indian-run racetrack casino in Washington County. Both proposals were not without controversy.

Francis died when his car crashed head first into a tanker truck. He had been on his way home from the signing of an agreement with the Venezuelan-owned Citgo Petroleum Corporation at Indian Island providing affordable oil to the Passamaquoddy, Penobscot, Mi'kmaq and Maliseet tribes in Maine.

Governor John Baldacci postponed the State of the State address for one day to attend the service on January 17, 2006. Also the United States flag and the State of Maine flag were flown at half staff on this day. The Chief Melvin Francis Memorial Fund was set up in his remembrance to improve the education, health, welfare, safety and lives of tribal members.
