= Douglas Smith (Maine politician) =

American politician from Maine (born 1946)

Member of the Maine Senate from the 27th district
- In office December 6, 2006 – December 1, 2010
- Preceded by: Paul T. Davis
- Succeeded by: Douglas Thomas

Member of the Maine House of Representatives
- In office January 6, 1971 – January 5, 1977
- Preceded by: multi-member district
- Succeeded by: Stephanie Locke
- Constituency: Piscataquis County (1971-1975); 84th district (1975-1977)

Personal details
- Born: Douglas Myles Smith; December 11, 1946 (age 79) Dover-Foxcroft, Maine, U.S.
- Party: Republican
- Spouse: Cartha Palmer
- Children: 2
- Education: University of Maine (BA, JD)

Douglas Myles Smith (born December 11, 1946) is an American politician from Maine. Smith, a Republican, served in Maine House of Representatives from 1971 to 1977 and the Maine Senate from 2006 to 2010 from District 27, which included his residence of Dover-Foxcroft in Piscataquis County. He chose not to seek re-election in 2010 and was replaced by Republican Douglas Thomas. In 2010, Smith was rumored to have sought the position of Maine Attorney General which eventually went to William Schneider.

Smith earned his B.A. at the University of Maine and his J.D. from the University of Maine School of Law. He has practiced law in Dover-Foxcroft for over 31 years. He has also served as a trustee at Foxcroft Academy and as a Piscataquis County Judge of Probate from 1979 to 2006.

Douglas is a 1965 graduate of Foxcroft Academy and lives part-time in The Villages, Florida with his wife Cartha Palmer and two children.
