= WSYY-FM =

Adult hits radio station in Millinocket, Maine

- Millinocket, Maine; United States
- Broadcast area: Central Penobscot County, Eastern Piscataquis County and Southern Aroostook County of Maine
- Branding: The Mountain 94.9

Programming
- Format: Full-service adult hits
- Affiliations: CBS News Radio; When Radio Was

Ownership
- Owner: James Talbott; (Katahdin Communications, Inc.)
- Sister stations: WSYY; WKTJ-FM

History
- First air date: 1978 (as WKTR at 97.7)
- Former call signs: WKTR (1978–1984)
- Former frequencies: 97.7 MHz (1978–1984)

Technical information
- Licensing authority: FCC
- Facility ID: 33470
- Class: C2
- ERP: 25,000 watts
- HAAT: 211 meters (692 ft)
- Transmitter coordinates: 45°42′58.1″N 68°47′52.1″W

Links
- Public license information: Public file; LMS

WSYY-FM (94.9 FM) is a radio station broadcasting a full-service adult hits format. Licensed to Millinocket, Maine, United States, the station's broadcast signal serves Central Penobscot County, Eastern Piscataquis County, and Southern Aroostook County, from its tower site in Millinocket. The station is owned by Katahdin Communications, Inc.

WSYY-FM plays a mix of oldies/classic hits, adult contemporary, rock music, and some country crossovers. The station also features programming from CBS News Radio (and has been an affiliate of that network for many decades). WSYY-FM also airs When Radio Was.

== History ==
In 1978, WSYY-FM was founded on 97.7 FM as WKTR, upgrading to its current facilities in 1984 on 94.9. Prior to their The Mountain 94.9 branding, WSYY-FM used to be referred to as North Country 95, airing country music full-time.

The current format, branding, and slogan was probably adopted around March 1, 2004, when Katahdin Communications, Inc. assumed control of WSYY-FM and WSYY from Katahdin Timberlands, LLC as a result of the radio station facing increasing land disputes, initially as a short term lease agreement, but the transfer of ownership became permanent. Those land disputes would lead to a loss of WSYY-FM's 23,500-watt transmitter location (featuring an antenna HAAT of 211 meters). WSYY-FM may have been operating under special temporary authority (a 12,000-watt facility with an antenna HAAT of 68 meters via Hammond Ridge on Lake Road), ever since as long ago as late 2007, pending a planned permanent move to a 22,000-watt facility with an antenna HAAT of 198.4 meters (from just off Nicatou Road in Medway, well east of WSYY-FM's old or current transmitter tower location). On November 23, 2016, the construction permit for this proposed move was modified to a 45,000-watt facility with an antenna HAAT of 146.7 meters, the first time this proposed move has ever received official approval from the FCC.

=== Former sports offerings ===
The Mountain 94.9 carried local high school sports in season until fall 2017. The Mountain 94.9 also carried the schedule of Red Sox Baseball from 1997 through 2015, when Millinocket's affiliation with the Boston Red Sox Radio Network transferred to co-owned WSYY, concluding the interruptions to the music during Major League Baseball. The transfer was completed on April 2, 2021, when 1240 WSYY returned to the air with translator 102.5 W273DJ debuting with the opening game of the Boston Red Sox.

== Syndicated programming ==
WSYY-FM is one of two Maine affiliates (the other being WLOB in Portland) of When Radio Was, is one of the two Maine affiliates (the other being WWMJ) of The Acoustic Storm, is Maine's only affiliate of the Crook & Chase syndicated country music countdown programming, and is an affiliate of the Blues Deluxe radio show.
