= Herbert E. Clark =

American politician

Herbert E. Clark is an American politician from Maine. A Democrat from Millinocket, Clark served 12 terms in the Maine House of Representatives. He was first elected in 1980 and was subsequently re-elected every two years until 1996. Clark ran again for the House in 2004 and was re-elected until 2012, when he was unable to seek re-election due to term limits. In 2012, he ran against incumbent Republican State Senator Doug Thomas for District 27. Clark lost to Thomas, receiving 8,061 votes to Thomas's 9,481. In 2014, Clark again ran for the State Senate, but lost in the primary to Representative Jim Dill.

Clark attended Eastern Maine Technical College, Kennebec Technical College and the University of Maine.
