= Molly Neptune Parker =

American basketweaver (1939–2020)

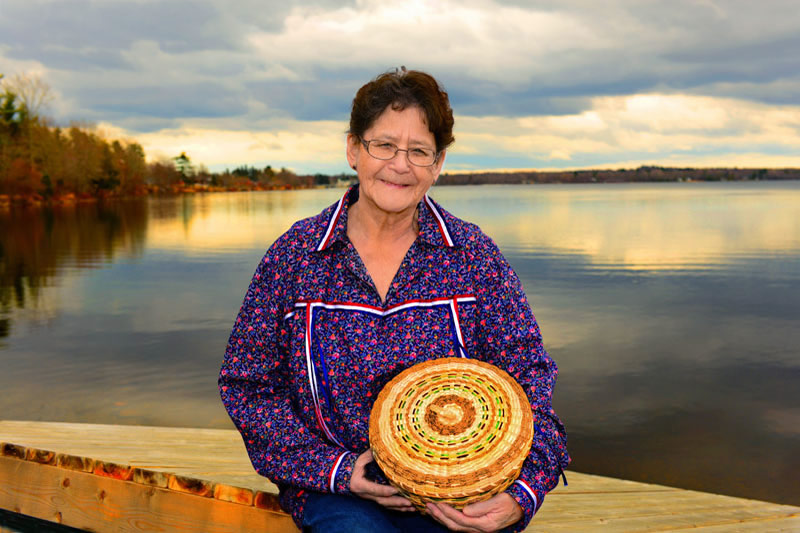
- Parker's National Endowment for the Arts Heritage Fellowship portrait, in 2013
- Born: Molly Newell; February 6, 1939; Indian Township, Maine, US
- Died: June 12, 2020 (aged 81); Calais, Maine, US
- Known for: Passamaquoddy basket weaving
- Spouses: Moses Neptune; Terrance C. Parker
- Awards: 2012 National Endowment for the Arts Heritage Fellowship

Molly Neptune Parker (February 6, 1939 – June 12, 2020) was an American basket weaver. She became well known for her artistry, with her works selling for thousands of dollars. As a co-founder and president of the Maine Indian Basketmakers Alliance, she tutored young people in the traditional craft and also educated four generations of her own family. She was also the first woman lieutenant governor of Indian Township, one of the two governing bodies of the Passamaquoddy tribe.

== Biography ==
Molly Newell was born on February 6, 1939, in Indian Township, Maine. She was the daughter of Irene Newell and Lewey Dana, who had six other children. Her first language was Passamaquoddy and at the school on the reservation that was run by nuns, she was punished for not using English. The nuns baptized her "Jeanette Katherine".

Parker was from a family of basket makers and started weaving as a child, using scraps from the ash wood that her mother discarded in the course of her weaving. While the men were responsible for pounding the wood, the women stripped the bark and split the wood into both thin and thick strips for use in different types of baskets. Some of Parker's later flower designs were the same ones used by her mother and grandmother. Her craft allowed her financial stability and helped her buy a house and educate her children.

Parker's first husband, Moses Neptune, was a truck and school-bus driver as well as a basket maker. Their children were taught to speak English to save them from the trauma in school of having English as a second language. When her children were young she would trade her baskets in return for their dental care. For a few years she would spend the day making baskets, then work on the night shift at a wool factory, and come home to serve her children their breakfast. At one point, she and her husband were making up to one hundred scale baskets a week, used in the fishing industry to collect fish scales for the production of nail polish. When Parker was older and her creations more well-known, she used basket weaving to support her family, buy a home, and contribute to paying for her grandchildren's education.

== Artistry ==
Parker employed techniques enshrined in her tribe's basket-weaving tradition and also developed intricate techniques of her own. Her specialty was a fancy basket with embellishments such as flowers on top. Her "signature creation" was a basket shaped like an acorn; she also made baskets in other shapes, such as strawberries. It would take her a total of five days to make a special basket from start to finish. As her artistry became more well known, her works began selling for thousands of dollars. People would call her by name when they saw her at airports. Her work is included in the Abbe Museum.

As a co-founder and president of the Maine Indian Basketmakers Alliance, Parker had the opportunity to tutor apprentices. She revitalized Passamaquoddy basketry by educating young people and teaching four generations of her family. One of her apprentices and grandchildren, Geo Soctomah Neptune, continues the tradition of basket weaving "with her in mind".

== Other activities ==
Parker was the first woman to serve as lieutenant governor of Indian Township, one of the two governing bodies of the Passamaquoddy tribe. She served on the Passamaquoddy council at the time that the U.S. government returned the tribe's land to their control in 1980.

In the 1990s she operated a restaurant called Molly's Luncheonette, which offered "classic American diner food along with Passamaquoddy specialties like hulled corn soup, stewed muskrat and fry bread".

== Personal life ==
Parker gave birth to six children, adopted three more, and was a foster mother to many others. After her divorce from her first husband, Moshe Neptune, she married Terrance C. Parker, a police officer.

Parker died on June 12, 2020, age 81.

== Awards and honors ==
- 2012 National Endowment for the Arts Heritage Fellowship
- Honorary Doctorate of Fine Arts from Bowdoin College in 2015
- Maine Arts Commission's Fellowship Award for Traditional Arts
- New England Foundation for the Arts - Native Arts Award
- First People's Funds Community Spirit Award
- Demonstrated Basketmaking at 2006 Smithsonian Folklife Festival
- Distinguished Achievement Award from University of Maine at Machias in 2013
