= East Millinocket (CDP), Maine =

East Millinocket, Maine
- Census-designated place
- Location within Maine Location within the United States
- Coordinates: 45°37′28″N 68°34′23″W
- Country: United States
- State: Maine
- County: Penobscot

Area
  - Total: 1.13 sq mi (2.92 km^{2})
  - Land: 1.13 sq mi (2.92 km^{2})
  - Water: 0 sq mi (0.00 km^{2})
- Elevation: 374 ft (114 m)

Population (2020)
  - Total: 1,560
  - Density: 1,383.8/sq mi (534.27/km^{2})
- Time zone: UTC-5 (Eastern (EST))
  - Summer (DST): UTC-4 (EDT)
- ZIP Code: 04430
- Area code: 207
- FIPS code: 23-21065
- GNIS feature ID: 2377905

East Millinocket is a census-designated place (CDP) consisting of the main settlement in the town of East Millinocket in Penobscot County, Maine, United States. The population was 1,567 at the 2010 census.

== Geography ==
According to the United States Census Bureau, the CDP has a total area of 0.97 square miles (2.5 km^{2}), all land.

== Demographics ==
Historical population
Census	Pop.	Note	%±
2020	1,560		—
U.S. Decennial Census

As of the census of 2000, there were 1,701 people, 734 households, and 515 families residing in the CDP. The population density was 1,769.2 inhabitants per square mile (683.1/km^{2}). There were 829 housing units at an average density of 862.2 per square mile (332.9/km^{2}). The racial makeup of the CDP was 98.47% White, 0.29% Native American, 0.24% Asian, 0.06% from other races, and 0.94% from two or more races. Hispanic or Latino of any race were 0.29% of the population.

There were 734 households, out of which 28.5% had children under the age of 18 living with them, 57.1% were married couples living together, 9.9% had a female householder with no husband present, and 29.8% were non-families. 27.7% of all households were made up of individuals, and 14.6% had someone living alone who was 65 years of age or older. The average household size was 2.32 and the average family size was 2.77.

In the CDP, the population was spread out, with 23.1% under the age of 18, 4.6% from 18 to 24, 25.1% from 25 to 44, 24.9% from 45 to 64, and 22.3% who were 65 years of age or older. The median age was 44 years. For every 100 females, there were 91.3 males. For every 100 females age 18 and over, there were 88.7 males.

The median income for a household in the CDP was $31,767, and the median income for a family was $39,286. Males had a median income of $46,184 versus $23,333 for females. The per capita income for the CDP was $18,975. About 11.8% of families and 13.9% of the population were below the poverty line, including 24.0% of those under age 18 and 6.1% of those age 65 or over.
