= Geo Soctomah Neptune =

Native American basket maker

Geo Neptune
- Niskapisuwin
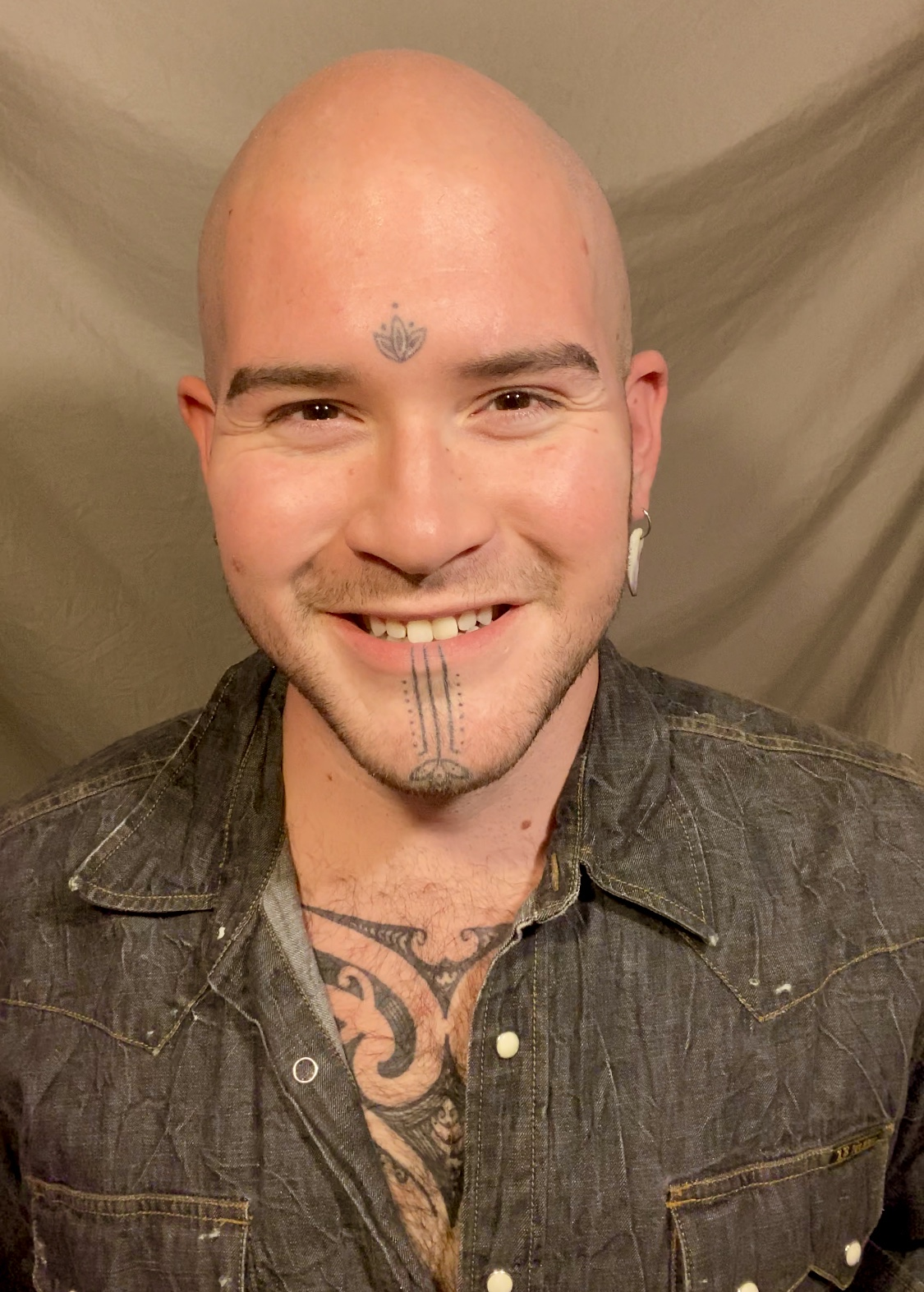
- Born: 1988 (age 37–38)
- Education: Indian Township School, Gould Academy, Dartmouth College
- Known for: black-ash basketry, Indigenous rights activism, Drag performance
- Elected: Indian Township School Board

Geo Soctomah Neptune is a Passamaquoddy two-spirit, master basket maker, activist, storyteller, model, and educator from Indian Township, Maine. Neptune uses they/them pronouns.

== Basketry ==
After graduating from Gould Academy and earning a theater degree from Dartmouth College, Neptune changed their plans of becoming an actor in New York City and instead returned home to volunteer at reservation schools, embracing customary basket making techniques that were taught to them by their grandmother, Molly Neptune Parker, a Passamaquoddy elder and master basket weaver. Neptune began making baskets with their grandmother Neptune Parker when they were four years old.

At four years old, Neptune was already asking their grandmother Molly Neptune Parker to teach them how to weave baskets. She told them to wait until they were older. So Neptune found another elder that would teach them, then they showed their grandmother their first completed basket. Later that year, after they turned five years old, Neptune wove their first basket with their grandmother. That began a lifelong apprenticeship. They are now a master basket maker, mentored by their grandmother, who died in June 2020.

Apikcilu Binds the Sun (2018) at the Renwick Gallery in 2023

Neptune experimented with their family's signature woven flowers mixed with natural elements of twigs and branches, they began forming what would eventually be known as their signature sculptural style of whimsical, elegant, traditionally-informed basketmaking. Passamaquoddy baskets have been made from a variety of materials including birch, basswood, maple, spruce, and cedar. It is brown ash, also known as black ash, that figures most prominently in basketry today. Prior to European contact, the Passamaquoddy people in Maine were hunters and gatherers, who moved seasonally and utilized bark, wood, and tree roots from the forests along with aromatic sweetgrass and cattails from the coastal wetlands to craft utilitarian bags, boxes, and other containers. But European colonization and economic hardship spawned a new tradition, "fancy baskets", which were decorative in nature and marketed to white tourists. Typically, men would make the utility baskets and women would make fancy baskets. For Neptune, weaving baskets with their grandmother and the women of their tribe was a sacred thing, a crucial first step in understanding their identity as two-spirit.

In February 2021, Neptune was awarded a $50,000 fellowship award from United States Artists for their accomplishments and ongoing creative excellence in black ash basketry. Neptune intends to continue to work in traditional arts, honoring their grandmother. They also plan to continue to work in various media, as they have done, in drag performance, hand-poke tattooing, and jewelry.

== Exhibitions ==
- "You Can't Get There From Here: 2015 Portland Museum of Art Biennial", Portland Museum of Art, Maine. October 8, 2015 - January 3, 2016.
- "Sharing Honors and Burdens: Renwick Invitational 2023", Renwick Gallery Smithsonian Institution. May 26, 2023 - March 31, 2024.

== Two-spirit identity ==
When an international movement for native rights emerged in Canada and spread worldwide called Idle-No-More, Neptune found their calling as an advocate against government abuse of Native people and lands.

The movement of indigenous people towards the use of the specific term two-spirit originates in the 1990s. However, in the use of the term and claiming of its identity there exists both deep ancestral connections as well as present day indigenous people's ability to actively reject and oppose normative colonial language that fails to fully encompass the range of gender and sexual identities that exists within indigenous communities. In contribution to the continued education of individuals Neptune published a video in 2018 about the meaning of two-spirit.

== Drag career ==
In 2006, Neptune began performing in shows as their drag persona "Lyzz Bien".

== School board ==
In September 2020, Neptune became the first openly transgender elected official in Maine after being elected for the school board in Indian Township, and the first two-spirit person to run for any office for the state. In their role on the school board, Neptune hopes to "increase student and teacher access to Passamaquoddy culture and ceremonial teachings, and work towards revitalising the native language".
