= Schenck High School =

Coordinates: 45.6324°N 68.5717°W

- 45 North Street, Suite 1 East Millinocket, Maine 04430; United States

Information
- NCES School ID: 230528000134
- Principal: Justin Page
- Grades: 9–12
- Gender: Mixed
- Enrollment: 102 (2023–2024)
- Website: www.eastmillinocketschools.org/o/ems/page/our-schools

Schenck High School is a public high school in East Millinocket, Maine, United States. It is a part of the East Millinocket Schools. It serves East Millinocket, Medway, and Woodville.

== Name and history ==
It is named after Garrett (Bush) Schenck, who made a large donation to build the first Schenck High School building in 1927. Schenck, who was vice president of the International Paper mill at Rumford Falls, helped establish the first Katahdin-region paper mills in East Millinocket and Millinocket.

In 1957 the current campus was built, and it opened the following year. The previous campus was renamed Opal Myrick Elementary School. In 1966 an addition in the current Schenck building opened. In 2011 Opal Myrick Elementary School moved into the Schenck campus; the enrollment in the elementary school declined, so the district decided to close the standalone Myrick building.

In early 2014, it was suggested that the school be renamed after Gloria MacKenzie, an area woman who donated $1.8 million to fix a leaking roof at the school after winning the powerball lottery. Renaming the school would also avoid using the word 'Schenck', which is commonly pronounced as the derogatory term "skank". The Mackenize family later indicated that they did not want the school renamed.

== Sports ==
In Maine, high school sports are categorized by the number of enrolled students. In the mid-1980s, Schenck switched from Class B to Class C, a changed that ignited controversy. In 2005, Schenck High School was reassigned to Class D sports by the Maine Principals Association, which oversees school sports. In that year, Schenck's enrollment dropped below 230 students to 216.

== Notable alumni ==
- Stephen W. Groves, World War II aviator
- Mike Michaud, U.S. Congressman
