= East Millinocket Schools =

Other information
- Website: www.eastmillinocketschools.org

School Union 113, or East Millinocket Schools, is a school district headquartered in East Millinocket, Maine. It serves East Millinocket, Medway, and Woodville. There are three schools: Opal Myrick Elementary School, Medway Middle School, and Schenck High School. Since 2011 Schenck and Myrick have shared the same campus in East Millinocket, with Myrick moving from a previous standalone campus. The middle school is in Medway.

The first female superintendent was Sandra MacArthur. In March 2003 she resigned effective June 30 so she could become the superintendent of Maine School Administrative District 59.
