= Old Town High School =

Location
- 203 Stillwater Avenue; Old Town, Maine 04468; United States
- Coordinates: 43.9165°N 69.8372°W

Information
- School type: Public secondary
- School district: RSU 34
- Faculty: 43.00 (on an FTE basis)
- Grades: 9–12
- Enrollment: 546 (2023–2024)
- Student to teacher ratio: 12.70
- Colors: Forest Green; White
- Mascot: Coyote
- Website: www.rsu34.org/o/oths

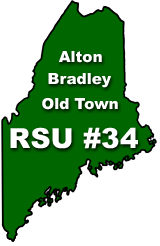
Logo for RSU #34

Old Town High School is a public high school in Old Town, Maine. It also serves the nearby towns of Alton and Bradley. It is part of RSU 34. OTHS sports teams are known as the Coyotes.

As of 2020 it takes high school students who graduated from Indian Island Elementary School. Linda McLeod, at one point principal of Indian Island, then the superintendent of Maine Indian Education (MIE), stated that some graduates of Indian Island School encountered problems at Old Town High, to where she said "when they go to Old Town High School, they are lost."

== Notable alumni ==
- Danny Costain, state legislator
- Chad Hayes, American football tight end
- Andre Miller, American football player
- Gary Thorne, sportscaster
