= WKTJ-FM =

Coordinates: 44.656°N 70.196°W

- Farmington, Maine; United States
- Broadcast area: Franklin County, Maine
- Frequency: 99.3 MHz
- Branding: Big Hits 99.3 KTJ

Programming
- Format: Full-service adult hits
- Affiliations: Boston Red Sox Radio Network

Ownership
- Owner: James Talbott; (Katahdin Communications, Inc.)
- Sister stations: WSYY; WSYY-FM

History
- First air date: 1973

Technical information
- Licensing authority: FCC
- Facility ID: 22323
- Class: A
- ERP: 1,500 watts
- HAAT: 122 meters (400 ft)

Links
- Public license information: Public file; LMS

WKTJ-FM (99.3 FM) is an American radio station licensed to Farmington, Maine. It is known on air as Big Hits 99-3 KTJ, broadcasting a full-service adult hits format.

As the only commercial radio station located in Franklin County, WKTJ is widely listened to in the community, with live DJs throughout the day and local features and sports during the school year. (Two non-commercial radio stations also originate from the county: WRGY in Rangeley and University of Maine at Farmington's WUMF.) The station also carries Boston Red Sox baseball (the WKTJ website says the station is the longest-running Red Sox radio affiliate, dating back to 1962) as well as local high school sports.

== History ==
WKTJ first came on air as an AM station (1380 on the dial) in 1959, with the co-owned FM signing on in 1973. The AM station played mostly a pop format (with a country and adult contemporary influence) in the 1970s and 1980s, but left the air in the early 1990s.

In January 2005, WKTJ-FM relaunched as "Big Hits 99.3 KTJ" with a classic hits/oldies format, while continuing with local shows such as The General Store Variety Hour and The Maine Music Hour. In September 2011, WKTJ shifted to its current adult hits format.
