= Orono High School (Maine) =

Location
- 14 Goodridge Drive; Orono, Maine 04473; United States
- 44°52′54″N 68°40′39″W

Information
- School type: Public, high school
- Oversight: RiverSide RSU#26
- Principal: Sam Runco
- Staff: 32.50 (FTE)
- Grades: 9–12
- Enrollment: 369 (2023–2024)
- Student to teacher ratio: 11.35
- Language: English
- Campus: Suburban
- Colors: Maroon and White
- Mascot: Red Riot
- Rival: Old Town High School
- Yearbook: Crimson Crier
- Feeder schools: Orono Middle School
- Website: ohs.rsu26.org

Orono High School is a high school in Orono, Maine, United States. Founded in 1915, it is the only high school in Regional School Unit 26.

As of 2020 it takes high school students who graduated from Indian Island School.

== History ==
The first class graduated from Orono in 1885, and a new school building was opened in the first years of the 20th century.

== Athletics ==
Orono's athletic teams are nicknamed Red Riots. The football team competes in the North Little Ten Conference.

State Championships
Sport	Years
Baseball	1978, 1994, 2017, 2021
Basketball (boys)	1958, 1961, 1962, 1967, 1969, 1973, 1981, 2023, 2024
Basketball (girls)	1996, 1998
Cheerleading	2016
Cross country (boys)	1971, 1975, 2016, 2017, 2021, 2024
Cross country (girls)	1976, 2013, 2014, 2015, 2017, 2018, 2019, 2021, 2022, 2023
Field hockey	1990, 1993
Football	1952, 1960*, 1966* 1968*, 1977*, 1978*, 1979*, 1990, 1994, 2023
Football (8-man)	2023
Golf (boys)	1961
Ice hockey (boys)	2018**
Nordic skiing	2018
Soccer (girls)	2015, 2016
Track and field (boys, indoor)	1976, 1982*
Tennis (boys)	2025
Track and field (boys, outdoor)	1961, 1962, 1968, 1969, 1970, 1972, 1973, 1974, 1975, 1976, 1977, 1983, 1986, 1989, 1996, 1997, 2015, 2016, 2017, 2023
Track and field (girls, indoor)	2016
Track and field (girls, outdoor)	1976, 1977, 1980, 1982, 1986, 2012, 2013, 2014, 2015, 2016, 2017, 2019, 2023

*denotes championship was a co-championship
**denotes championship was part of a co-op team with Old Town High School

== Performing arts ==
OHS has a competitive show choir. It won the Maine state championship in 2019.

== Notable alumni ==
- Steve Abbott, politician
- Anne Hall, US ambassador to Lithuania
- Ann O'Leary, political advisor
