= Indian Township School =

Indigenous school in Maine, United States

Coordinates: 45.2123°N 67.6317°W

Indian Island School is a K-8 school located in the Passamaquoddy Indian Township Reservation, Maine. Indian Township School's school administrative unit is the Indian Township School District.

== History ==
Beginning circa 1972 the school began sponsorship of a program to teach the Passamaquoddy language, the Wabanaki Bilingual Education Program.

Circa 1993 the school began a mentorship program with the University of Maine at Machias so students could get mentoring. In 1995 the program received a $25,000 grant.

== Admissions ==
As of 1976 any children who are not enrolled in a Native American tribe would be sent to a school in Princeton, Maine.

== Governance ==
It is one of three schools in the Maine Indian Education (MIE) school district system, supported by funding by the Bureau of Indian Education (BIE). There are three school boards, one for each school, and each school has its own principal, while MIE has a collective superintendent. The MIE is akin to a main "union of towns" school system where multiple school administrative units share a superintendent but otherwise operate separately.

== Feeder patterns ==
High schools which take students from this school include Calais High School, Lee Academy, Mattanawcook Academy (the high school of Lincoln-Region 3) St. Croix Tech Center, Washington Academy, Wayfinder School, Woodland High School, and Bangor Regional Program (of the Bangor School Department).
