= American Loggers =

Television series

American Loggers is a television series on the Discovery Channel. It was shot in Maine, debuted in 2009, and went off the air in 2011 after three seasons.

== Storyline ==
The show follows the Pelletier family from Millinocket, Maine. With their companies Gerald Pelletier, Inc and Pelletier Brothers, Inc they have a long tradition of logging in the North Maine Woods region of northern woods of Maine.

Meanwhile, the family has expanded the fields they work in. Trailer manufacturing and a restaurant business (now closed) and possibly insurance have been added to the business.

== Episodes ==
| Season | Episodes | Originally released | |
| Season | Episodes | First released | Last released |
|---|---|---|---|
| 1 | 10 | February 27, 2009 | September 3, 2009 |
| 2 | 10 | February 19, 2010 | April 23, 2010 |
| 3 | 10 | March 4, 2011 | May 8, 2011 |

== Reception ==
Common Sense Media rated the show 3 out of 5 stars.
