= WSYY (AM) =

- Millinocket, Maine; United States
- Broadcast area: Millinocket, Maine
- Frequency: 1240 kHz

Programming
- Format: Talk
- Affiliations: CBS News Radio; Boston Red Sox Radio Network

Ownership
- Owner: James Talbott; (Katahdin Communications, Inc.)
- Sister stations: WSYY-FM; WKTJ-FM

History
- First air date: 1963
- Former call signs: WMKR (1963–1984)

Technical information
- Licensing authority: FCC
- Facility ID: 33469
- Class: C
- Power: 1,000 watts unlimited
- Transmitter coordinates: 45°40′24.2″N 68°43′5.1″W
- Translator: 102.5 W273DJ (Millinocket)

Links
- Public license information: Public file; LMS

WSYY (1240 AM) is a talk-formatted radio station licensed to Millinocket, Maine, United States. The station serves the Northern and Downeast Maine area. The station is currently owned by Katahdin Broadcasting, Inc. The station currently features programming from CBS News Radio and carries its newscasts at the top of every hour (and has been an affiliate of that network for many decades), as well as having covered University of Maine Black Bears sports in the past. The station had also carried local high school sports for many years, but had more recently discontinued those offerings.

WSYY had been silent for much of the late-2010s through early-2021, serving as a part-time simulcast of co-owned WSYY-FM a couple times a year (in order to retain its license), and had also meanwhile hinted (from mid-2017 through early-2021) on simulcasting over a new FM translator (at 102.5 MHz) in the future. On April 2, 2021, 1240 WSYY returned to the air and translator, 102.5 W273DJ debuted with the opening game of the Boston Red Sox. WSYY-FM had previously carried Red Sox games from 1997 through 2015, when Millinocket's affiliation with the Boston Red Sox Radio Network would ultimately be transferred over to WSYY. Complications in the licensing process would cause 102.5 W273DJ delays towards being officially licensed for operations by the FCC until April 1, 2022.

== Translators ==
In addition to the main station, WSYY is relayed by an FM translator.

Broadcast translator for WSYY
Call sign	Frequency	City of license	FID	ERP (W)	HAAT	Class	Transmitter coordinates	FCC info
W273DJ	102.5 FM	Millinocket, Maine	200276	250	0 m (0 ft)	D	45°40′25.83″N 68°43′15.86″W	LMS
