= Millinocket School Department =

School district in Millinocket, Penobscot County, Maine, United States

Address
- P.O. Box 30 Millinocket, Maine, 04462; United States

District information
- Superintendent: Shelley Lane

Other information
- Website: www.millinocketschools.org

Millinocket School Department is a school district headquartered in Millinocket, Maine. Its schools are Granite Street School and Stearns Junior-Senior High School.

In April 2012, due to decreasing enrollment in the high school, the district superintendent, Ken Smith, made efforts to recruit international students from China.

As of 2025 the Maine Department of Education assigns some students in unorganized territories to this school department.
