= Mary Mitchell Gabriel =

American basketmaker

- Mary Mitchell Gabriel, from a 1993 newspaper
- Born: November 12, 1908; Princeton, Maine
- Died: July 10, 2004 (aged 95); Indian Township, Maine
- Occupation: Artist

Margaret Mary Mitchell Gabriel (November 12, 1908 – July 10, 2004) was a Passamaquoddy basket maker from Maine. She was awarded a National Heritage Fellowship in 1994.

== Early life ==
Mary Mitchell was born on the Passamaquoddy reservation near Princeton, Maine, the daughter of Joseph Mitchell and Margaret Mell Mitchell. She and her sisters were raised by their grandparents, and learned Passamaquoddy traditions of making baskets of sweetgrass and ash splints from their mother and grandmother.

== Career ==
Gabriel worked at the Emple Knitting Mill in Brewer, Maine. She moved back to Princeton when she received money from the Maine Indian Land Claims Settlement, and made and sold her baskets there. "Every person who looks at my basket asks, 'How long did it take you to make this?'" she said in 1995. "You could say forever", she answered.

In 1993 she won the Maine Arts Commission's Individual Artist Award, and she was one of the founders of the Maine Indian Basket Makers Alliance. In 1994, she was awarded a National Heritage Fellowship from the National Endowment for the Arts, and a Maryann Hartman Award from the University of Maine. At the Hartman Awards ceremony, she delivered her acceptance speech in Passamaquoddy. The Center for the Study of Lives at the University of Southern Maine made a documentary, "Gabriel Women: Passamaquoddy Basketmakers" (1999), about Mary Gabriel and her daughters Sylvia and Clare.

== Personal life and legacy ==
Mitchell married Simon Anthony Gabriel. She had seven children. She died in 2004, aged 95 years, at her home in Indian Township, Maine. Her baskets are in the collections of the Smithsonian Institution, the Abbe Museum, the Hudson Museum, and the Bangor International Airport. Her daughter Deborah Gabriel Brooks's Sweetgrass Basketry continues producing baskets based on Gabriel's teachings.
