= Chad Hayes (American football) =

American football player (born 1979)

Chad Hayes (born January 26, 1979) is a former American football tight end. He graduated from Old Town High School before playing football for the University of Maine Black Bears. In 2001, he was a second-team I-AA All American with Maine. Hayes went undrafted in the 2002 NFL draft but played in the National Football League in either the preseason or on the practice squad with the Kansas City Chiefs, Cincinnati Bengals, San Diego Chargers and Tennessee Titans. Prior to the 2002 Draft, Hayes was ranked the 17th best tight end prospect, ahead of future NFL players Jeb Putzier, John Owens, Kori Dickerson and John Gilmore.

In 2003, Hayes played for the Berlin Thunder in NFL Europe and caught 12 passes for 122 yards. In 2004, Hayes competed for the Frankfurt Galaxy in NFL Europe and made 11 catches for 144 yards during the regular season. In the World Bowl XII, Hayes caught two passes for 18 yards though the Galaxy lost to the Berlin Thunder 30–24.
