= Sipayik Elementary School =

Native American school in Maine, United States

Coordinates: 44.9654°N 67.0617°W

Sipayik Elementary School is a K-8 school located in the Passamaquoddy Pleasant Point Reservation, Maine. Sipayik Elementary School's school administrative unit is the Pleasant Point School District, which covers the reservation.

The previous facility was known as the Beatrice Rafferty School (BRS). The current Sipayik elementary opened in 2021, replacing the former school. Construction on the Sipayik facility had been initiated in May 2019. The former Rafferty School became the tribal office building.

== Governance ==
It is one of three schools in the Maine Indian Education (MIE) school district system, supported by funding by the Bureau of Indian Education (BIE). There are three school boards, one for each school, and each school has its own principal, while MIE has a collective superintendent. The MIE is akin to a main "union of towns" school system where multiple school administrative units share a superintendent but otherwise operate separately.

== Curriculum ==
As of 2015 the Rafertty School had instruction in some vocabulary of the Passamaquoddy language, along with indigenous culture.

== Feeder patterns ==
High schools which take students from this school include Calais High School, Shead High School, St. Croix Tech Center, and Washington Academy.
