= Maine Indian Education =

Maine Indian Education (MIE) is an indigenous school system in Maine, supported by funding by the Bureau of Indian Education (BIE). There are three schools in the system: there are three school boards, one for each school, and each school has its own principal, while MIE has a collective superintendent. The MIE is akin to a Maine "union of towns" school system where multiple school administrative units share a superintendent but otherwise operate separately. The superintendent office is in Calais.

The three schools in the system are: Indian Island School, Indian Township School, and Sipayik Elementary School (formerly Beatrice Rafferty School).

== History ==
In 1981, the MIE sent some students to Calais for education.

In 2009 the MIE was in the process of trying to purchase the Downeast Heritage Museum, which it rented space from; MIE had a ten-year lease with the museum. The museum had filed for Chapter 7 bankruptcy in 2008. That year, the museum closed. The MIE acquired the museum, renamed it the Wabanaki Cultural Center but did not use money earmarked for education to operate the facility. The MIE planned to use it as an event space and as a museum open to appointments, and sought to reopen it in a capacity.

== See also ==
- List of school districts in Maine
