= Scarborough Public Schools =

School district in Scarborough, Cumberland County, Maine, United States

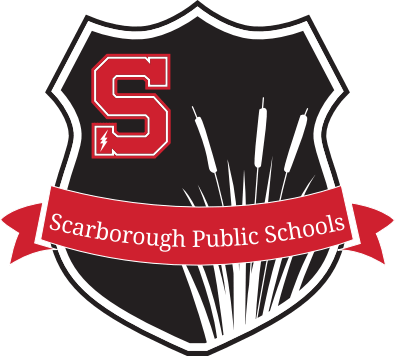

Location
- 259 U.S. Route 1, Scarborough, Cumberland County, Maine 04074

District information
- Type: Public
- Grades: K-12
- Superintendent: Diane Nadeau
- Schools: 6 (2021-2022)
- Budget: $57,669,616 (Fiscal year 2023)
- NCES District ID: 2310530

Students and staff
- Students: 2880 (2021-2022)
- Teachers: 261 (2021-2022)
- Staff: 535 (2021-2022)
- Student–teacher ratio: 11:1

Other information
- Website: www.scarboroughschools.org

Scarborough Public Schools is the public school department in Scarborough, Maine, United States. The district oversees six primary schools and secondary schools. The system operates three elementary schools, and one intermediate, middle, and high school. For the 2021–2022 school year, there were approximately 2880 total students.

== Schools ==
- Eight Corners Primary School (Grades K-2)
- Blue Point Primary School (Grades K-2)
- Pleasant Hill Primary School (Grades K-2)
- Wentworth School (Grades 3–5)
- Scarborough Middle School (Grades 6–8)
- Scarborough High School (Grades 9–12)
- Scarborough Adult Learning Center
