= Indian Island School =

Native American school in Maine, United States

Coordinates: 44.9498°N 68.6469°W

Indian Island School is a K-8 school located in the Penobscot Indian Island Reservation, Maine, United States. Indian Island School's school administrative unit is the Indian Island School District.

== History ==
The Indian Island School was originally founded in 1860.

In 1978, the State of Maine told the school to stop having instruction on religion.

In 1986, a new school facility began operations. At that time the enrollment was about 100. It was designed by Webster-Baldwin-Rohman-Day-Szarniecki, which received the Architectural Portfolio Award for this school design that year. At the time, the school included grades preschool through seven, and it planned to have up to grade 9.

== Governance ==
This is one of three schools in the Maine Indian Education (MIE) school district system, supported by funding by the Bureau of Indian Education (BIE). There are three school boards, one for each school, and each school has its own principal, while MIE has a collective superintendent. The MIE is akin to a main "union of towns" school system, where multiple school administrative units share a superintendent but otherwise operate separately.

Funding for the school comes from the federal government and the state of Maine; no local tax-based funding is given to the school.

== Campus ==
The school has a building for cultural performances, and it has murals depicting indigenous culture. The stone in the school has a motif based on basket weaving.

== Feeder patterns ==
As of 2020, common feeder public high schools in the same county as Indian Island School include Old Town High School and Orono High School. Some students attend John Bapst Memorial High School, which is a private school in Bangor.

Linda McLeod, then the principal of Indian Island School, and later MIE superintendent, stated that some graduates of Indian Island Elementary encountered problems at Old Town High; she said "when they go to Old Town High School, they are lost."

In addition to Old Town, Orono, and Bapst, high schools which take students from this school include Bangor High School, Brewer High School, United Technologies Center ("Bangor Region-Tech School"), and Stillwater Academy.
