= Bangor School Department =

School district in Maine, United States

Bangor School Department is the school district of Bangor, Maine, United States.

== History ==
Betsy Webb served as superintendent until October, 2020. In November 2020 Kathy Harris-Smedberg began her term as a superintendent on an interim basis. On July 1, 2021, James Tager became the permanent superintendent.

In June 2022 the district sought to have the University of Maine go through the district's operations so the university could offer ideas on how to make the school district more inclusive of students from different backgrounds.

== Schools ==
Schools include:

High school (9-12)

- Bangor High School - the sole public high school

Middle schools (6-8)

- James F. Doughty School
- William S. Cohen School

Grade 4-5 schools

- Fairmount School
- Mary Snow School

Grade K-3 schools

- Abraham Lincoln School
- Downeast School
- Fourteenth Street School
- Fruit Street School
- Vine Street School
