= Millinocket, Maine =

Town in Maine, United States

- Town
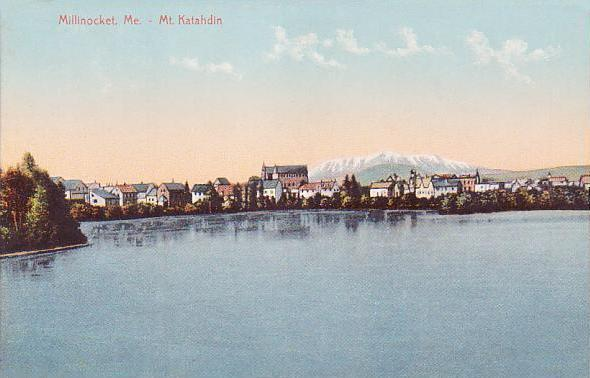
- 1907 postcard

- Flag Seal
- Motto: "Maine's Biggest Small Town"
- Location within Maine Location within the United States
- Coordinates: 45°39′29″N 68°41′52″W
- Country: United States
- State: Maine
- County: Penobscot
- Settled: 1829
- Incorporated: March 16, 1901

Area
  - Total: 18.22 sq mi (47.19 km^{2})
  - Land: 15.95 sq mi (41.31 km^{2})
  - Water: 2.27 sq mi (5.88 km^{2})
- Elevation: 433 ft (132 m)

Population (2020)
  - Total: 4,114
  - Density: 258/sq mi (99.6/km^{2})
- Time zone: UTC−5 (Eastern (EST))
  - Summer (DST): UTC−4 (EDT)
- ZIP code: 04462
- Area code: 207
- FIPS code: 23-45810
- GNIS feature ID: 582596
- Website: www.millinocket.org

Millinocket is a town in Penobscot County, Maine, United States. The population was 4,114 at the 2020 census. It contains the census-designated place of the same name.

Millinocket's economy has historically been centered on forest products and recreation, but the paper company closed in 2008.

== History ==
Millinocket is an Abenaki word that means land of many islands. For more than 10,000 years the area now known as Millinocket was inhabited by the Penobscot (their name for themselves is Pαnawάhpskewi), an Indigenous people from the Northeastern Woodlands region whose name means the people of where the white rocks extend out.

The area was settled in 1829 by Betsy and Thomas Fowler and their family, who cleared land for a farm near Shad Pond. Other families followed in 1837. In 1846, Henry David Thoreau hired members of the Fowler family as guides on a trip to Mount Katahdin, which he wrote about in The Maine Woods. When the Bangor and Aroostook Railroad extended service to Houlton in 1894, the line ran through the area, opening it to development.

Charles W. Mullen, an engineering graduate from the University of Maine, proposed a hydroelectric dam on the Penobscot River. He recognized the falls as an ideal water power source to operate a large pulp and paper mill. Mullen contacted Garret Schenck, vice president of the International Paper mill at Rumford Falls and an expert in the industry, about building a pulp and paper mill near the dam. Schenck agreed, and set about obtaining the necessary financial backing.

After securing land rights, the chosen site was at the junction of the West Branch of the Penobscot River and Millinocket Stream, where it stands today. Things moved quickly, and on May 15, 1899, construction began on the new Great Northern Paper Company paper mill. As the location was not near existing towns, it became necessary to build one. Millinocket, meaning "the land of many islands" after all the islands in the Penobscot River, was incorporated on March 16, 1901.

Schenck contracted bonded labor, especially stonemasons from Italy. The term "bonded" in this case referred to the fact that the Italians owed for the passage to the U.S. and were in debt as soon as they set foot in this country. Italian masons were largely responsible for constructing the Millinocket mill. Immigrants from Poland, Finland, Lithuania, and Hungary, as well as French Canadians, also came to work on the mill.

Throughout the 20th century, the community prospered. It developed a reputation as a small but successful rural town, mostly due to the paper industry, but also to its proximity to Millinocket Lake, the Pemadumcook Chain of Lakes and Katahdin, Maine's tallest mountain.

In early 2003, Great Northern Paper announced it had filed for bankruptcy protection for its Millinocket and East Millinocket mills. Since then, the mill town has struggled to reshape its economy, while receiving significant help from the state government and local economic development efforts. Shortly after closing the mills in 2008, a Canadian corporation purchased the bankrupt paper mills in both Millinocket and East Millinocket. In addition to the traditional forest products industry, Millinocket has been growing a service economy, and has grown into a major four-season tourist attraction. The region is served by the Millinocket Municipal Airport, which sells both 100LL avgas and jet fuel.

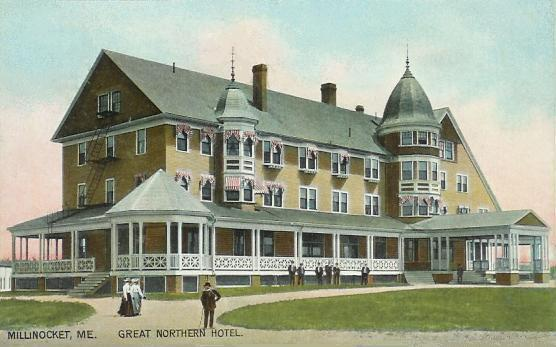
Great Northern Hotel in Millinocket (1906)

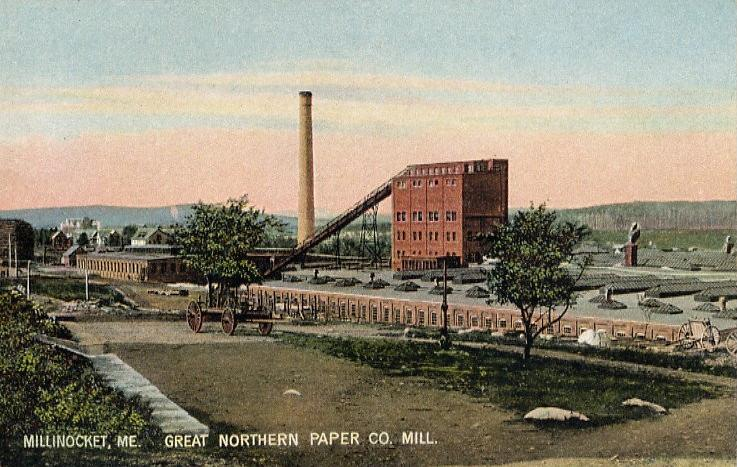
Great Northern Paper Company Mill in Millinocket (1907)

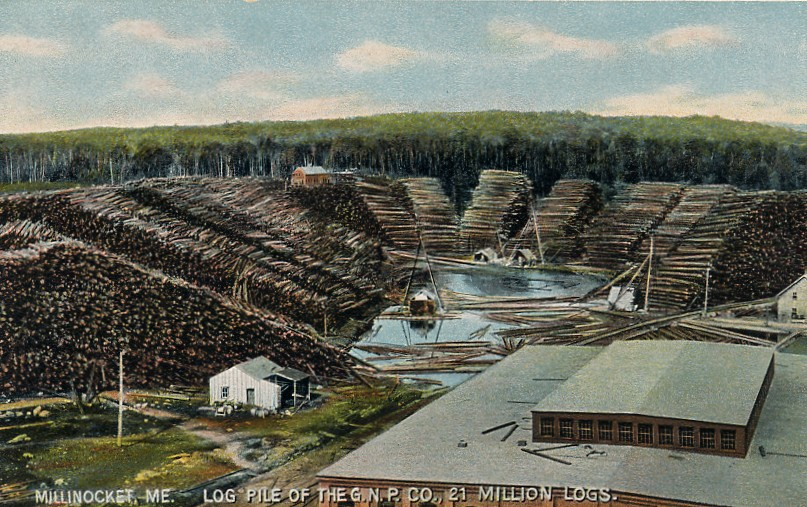
Log pile in Millinocket (1908)

== Geography ==
According to the United States Census Bureau, the town has an area of 18.22 square miles (47.19 km^{2}), of which 15.95 square miles (41.31 km^{2}) is land and 2.27 square miles (5.88 km^{2}) is water.

The town is crossed by State Route 11 and State Route 157. The town of East Millinocket is 8 miles (13 km) to the east. Millinocket is the closest town to Mount Katahdin, in Baxter State Park, 20 miles (32 km) to the northwest. At an elevation of 5,270 feet (1,610 m), its summit is the highest point in Maine and the northern terminus of the Appalachian Trail.

Millinocket Stream flows through the town, from Millinocket Lake north of the town into the West Branch Penobscot River.

=== Climate ===
This climatic region is typified by large seasonal temperature differences, with warm to hot (and often humid) summers and cold (sometimes severely cold) winters. According to the Köppen Climate Classification system, Millinocket has a humid continental climate, abbreviated "Dfb" on climate maps.

Climate data for Millinocket, Maine, 1991–2020 normals, extremes 1903–present
Month	Jan	Feb	Mar	Apr	May	Jun	Jul	Aug	Sep	Oct	Nov	Dec	Year
Record high °F (°C)	56 (13)	62 (17)	80 (27)	87 (31)	96 (36)	101 (38)	100 (38)	100 (38)	96 (36)	87 (31)	74 (23)	62 (17)	101 (38)
Mean maximum °F (°C)	46.2 (7.9)	45.7 (7.6)	55.3 (12.9)	72.1 (22.3)	83.8 (28.8)	89.3 (31.8)	90.2 (32.3)	89.4 (31.9)	84.8 (29.3)	72.8 (22.7)	61.7 (16.5)	49.8 (9.9)	93.0 (33.9)
Mean daily maximum °F (°C)	23.6 (−4.7)	26.5 (−3.1)	36.3 (2.4)	49.9 (9.9)	63.9 (17.7)	73.5 (23.1)	78.5 (25.8)	77.5 (25.3)	69.6 (20.9)	55.2 (12.9)	42.8 (6.0)	30.9 (−0.6)	52.4 (11.3)
Daily mean °F (°C)	14.1 (−9.9)	16.3 (−8.7)	26.3 (−3.2)	39.7 (4.3)	52.5 (11.4)	62.5 (16.9)	67.9 (19.9)	66.5 (19.2)	58.5 (14.7)	46.0 (7.8)	34.9 (1.6)	23.0 (−5.0)	42.4 (5.8)
Mean daily minimum °F (°C)	4.6 (−15.2)	6.0 (−14.4)	16.3 (−8.7)	29.6 (−1.3)	41.2 (5.1)	51.4 (10.8)	57.2 (14.0)	55.5 (13.1)	47.5 (8.6)	36.8 (2.7)	26.9 (−2.8)	15.1 (−9.4)	32.3 (0.2)
Mean minimum °F (°C)	−15.3 (−26.3)	−12.5 (−24.7)	−4.8 (−20.4)	17.2 (−8.2)	30.0 (−1.1)	39.7 (4.3)	47.9 (8.8)	44.7 (7.1)	32.8 (0.4)	23.6 (−4.7)	10.7 (−11.8)	−5.8 (−21.0)	−17.6 (−27.6)
Record low °F (°C)	−41 (−41)	−40 (−40)	−32 (−36)	−5 (−21)	19 (−7)	26 (−3)	37 (3)	32 (0)	22 (−6)	11 (−12)	−10 (−23)	−35 (−37)	−41 (−41)
Average precipitation inches (mm)	3.12 (79)	2.70 (69)	3.10 (79)	3.74 (95)	3.69 (94)	4.21 (107)	4.43 (113)	4.12 (105)	3.89 (99)	4.72 (120)	3.92 (100)	3.72 (94)	45.36 (1,152)
Average snowfall inches (cm)	23.3 (59)	19.1 (49)	18.6 (47)	4.5 (11)	0.0 (0.0)	0.0 (0.0)	0.0 (0.0)	0.0 (0.0)	0.0 (0.0)	0.4 (1.0)	3.6 (9.1)	16.6 (42)	86.1 (219)
Average precipitation days (≥ 0.01 in)	10.5	8.9	10.1	10.1	12.4	12.8	13.8	10.6	10.7	12.1	11.1	10.5	133.6
Average snowy days (≥ 0.1 in)	7.4	6.5	5.4	1.5	0.0	0.0	0.0	0.0	0.0	0.4	2.0	5.9	29.1
Average relative humidity (%)	88	89	89	80	75	77	77	79	79	80	79	84	81
Mean daily sunshine hours	4.0	3.3	4.5	6.6	7.7	8.4	9.5	9.8	7.8	6.0	4.7	4.1	6.4
Mean daily daylight hours	9.2	10.4	12.0	13.6	15.0	15.7	15.3	14.1	12.5	10.9	9.5	8.8	12.3
Average ultraviolet index	2	1	2	3	4	5	5	4	3	2	2	1	3
Source 1: NWS
Source 2: Weather Atlas (UV and humidity)

== Demographics ==
Historical population
Census	Pop.	Note	%±
1910	3,368		—
1920	4,528		34.4%
1930	5,830		28.8%
1940	6,223		6.7%
1950	5,890		−5.4%
1960	7,453		26.5%
1970	7,742		3.9%
1980	7,567		−2.3%
1990	6,956		−8.1%
2000	5,203		−25.2%
2010	4,506		−13.4%
2020	4,104		−8.9%
U.S. Decennial Census

=== 2020 census ===
As of the census of 2020, there were 4,104 people, 2,123 households, and 1,274 families living in the town. The population density was 257.3 inhabitants per square mile (99.3/km^{2}). There were 2,521 housing units at an average density of 158.1 per square mile (61.0/km^{2}). The racial makeup of the town was 93.9% White, .2% Black or African American, .7% Native American, .4% Asian, .1% from other races and 3.6% from two or more races. Hispanic or Latino of any race were 1.1% of the population.

The median age in the town was 57.7 years.

=== 2010 census ===
As of the census of 2010, there were 4,506 people, 2,167 households, and 1,305 families living in the town. The population density was 282.5 inhabitants per square mile (109.1/km^{2}). There were 2,586 housing units at an average density of 162.1 per square mile (62.6/km^{2}). The racial makeup of the town was 97.7% White, 0.2% African American, 0.7% Native American, 0.4% Asian, 0.1% Pacific Islander, 0.1% from other races, and 0.8% from two or more races. Hispanic or Latino of any race were 0.5% of the population.

There were 2,167 households, of which 19.3% had children under the age of 18 living with them, 48.4% were married couples living together, 8.7% had a female householder with no husband present, 3.1% had a male householder with no wife present, and 39.8% were non-families. 34.2% of all households were made up of individuals, and 17.1% had someone living alone who was 65 years of age or older. The average household size was 2.06 and the average family size was 2.58.

The median age in the town was 51.5 years. 15.5% of residents were under the age of 18; 5.5% were between the ages of 18 and 24; 17.8% were from 25 to 44; 36.6% were from 45 to 64; and 24.6% were 65 years of age or older. The gender makeup of the town was 48.6% male and 51.4% female.

=== 2000 census ===
As of the census of 2000, there were 5,203 people, 2,295 households, and 1,556 families living in the town. The population density was 327.5 inhabitants per square mile (126.4/km^{2}). There were 2,679 housing units at an average density of 168.6/sq mi (65.1/km^{2}). The racial makeup of the town was 98.52% White, 0.10% Black or African American, 0.54% Native American, 0.37% Asian, 0.02% from other races, and 0.46% from two or more races. Hispanic or Latino of any race were 0.23% of the population.

There were 2,295 households, out of which 25.7% had children under the age of 18 living with them, 55.7% were married couples living together, 9.1% had a female householder with no husband present, and 32.2% were non-families. 28.3% of all households were made up of individuals, and 14.5% had someone living alone who was 65 years of age or older. The average household size was 2.25 and the average family size was 2.69.

In the town, the population was spread out, with 21.1% under the age of 18, 4.9% from 18 to 24, 25.0% from 25 to 44, 29.7% from 45 to 64, and 19.4% who were 65 years of age or older. The median age was 44 years. For every 100 females, there were 93.9 males. For every 100 females age 18 and over, there were 90.5 males.

The median income for a household in the town was $29,318, and the median income for a family was $40,893. Males had a median income of $41,218 versus $23,289 for females. The per capita income for the town was $17,130. About 11.8% of families and 14.8% of the population were below the poverty line, including 20.4% of those under age 18 and 12.4% of those age 65 or over.

== Arts and culture ==
Closely spaced mill-era homes along Katahdin Avenue

Sites of interest include the Antique Snowmobile Museum, the Millinocket Historical Society and Museum, the Boreal Theater, and the West Branch of the Penobscot River.

In 2015, Gary Allen, a long-distance runner and race director, founded the Millinocket Marathon and Half. The race attracts runners from all 50 US states and internationally.

== Education ==
Schools in Millinocket are under the jurisdiction of the Millinocket School Department. The town's primary school is the Granite Street School, the middle school is Millinocket Middle School, and the secondary school is Stearns High School.

== Media ==
=== Newspaper ===
Millinocket has one traditional newspaper and one online newspaper which serve the area:

- Katahdin/Lincoln area News, a weekly newspaper, distributed each Thursday, which offers a Millinocket section.
- Magic City Morning Star, which has published online since 2002.

=== Radio ===
The area is served by several radio stations, mainly Millinocket-licensed WSYY-FM The Mountain 94.9 (broadcasting for approximately 18¼ hours per day, 7 days a week (from 4:55 am through 11:10 pm ET), under the slogan, "Radio With An Attitude") and WSYY 1240 offers CBS Sports Radio as "CBS Sports Radio for the Katahdin Area" from Dawn until Dusk (ET), broadcasting only on Weekends (but not between Monday-through-Friday). As an Adult Hits/Full-Service radio station, WSYY-FM airs a format consisting of a mix of oldies/classic hits, adult contemporary, rock music, and some country crossovers, airing the format for approximately 16 hours per day, from 6:00 am through 10:00 pm ET (reserving the first and, also, the final hour of their broadcast day to When Radio Was). Stations from Bangor and the more powerful stations from Presque Isle are also heard.

=== Television ===
Millinocket was home to the Discovery Channel TV show American Loggers which showcased the logging efforts of Gerald Pelletier Incorporated. Cable television is provided by Bee Line Cable, which provides most of the network affiliates from Bangor.

== Notable people ==
- George F. Carrier, applied mathematician Brown and Harvard University
- Herbert E. Clark, state legislator
- Harry A. Corey, entrepreneur, Canadian politician
- Allen Lee Davis, triple murderer, last man to be executed by the electric chair in Florida
- Joseph John Gerry OSB, Bishop of Portland until 2004
- Mary Kathryn Gonya, Miss Maine (1966)
- Jane Harragan, Miss Maine (1950)
- Marc Macauly, actor
- Mike Michaud, former member of the United States House of Representatives
- Charles P. Pray, politician
- Andrew St. John, actor
- Joe Whalen, tennis player
