= Medway, Maine =

- Town
- Seal
- Motto: Gateway to Maine's North Woods
- Location within Maine Location within the United States
- Coordinates: 45°37′10″N 68°29′56″W
- Country: United States
- State: Maine
- County: Penobscot

Area
  - Total: 41.14 sq mi (106.55 km^{2})
  - Land: 41.00 sq mi (106.19 km^{2})
  - Water: 0.14 sq mi (0.36 km^{2})
- Elevation: 289 ft (88 m)

Population (2020)
  - Total: 1,187
  - Density: 29/sq mi (11.2/km^{2})
- Time zone: UTC-5 (Eastern (EST))
  - Summer (DST): UTC-4 (EDT)
- ZIP code: 04460
- Area code: 207
- FIPS code: 23-45005
- GNIS feature ID: 582590
- Website: www.medwaymaine.org

Medway is a town in Penobscot County, Maine, United States. The population was 1,187 at the 2020 census.

== History ==
One of the largest water powered sawmills then on the Penobscot River was built in Medway in 1820 by Gen. Boyd, who owned half the township. A second large mill was built soon after near what is now Medway Center, attracting settlers. Sawmills remained there as late as the 1920s. Boyd originally incorporated the town as "Kilmarnock", but the name was changed to Medway in 1854.

== Geography ==
According to the United States Census Bureau, the town has a total area of 41.14 square miles (106.55 km^{2}), of which 41.00 square miles (106.19 km^{2}) is land and 0.14 square miles (0.36 km^{2}) is water. The town is at the confluence of the East and West Branches of the Penobscot River.

== Demographics ==
Historical population
Census	Pop.	Note	%±
1870	415		—
1880	628		51.3%
1890	653		4.0%
1900	279		−57.3%
1910	489		75.3%
1920	390		−20.2%
1930	406		4.1%
1940	623		53.4%
1950	725		16.4%
1960	1,266		74.6%
1970	1,491		17.8%
1980	1,871		25.5%
1990	1,922		2.7%
2000	1,489		−22.5%
2010	1,349		−9.4%
2020	1,187		−12.0%
U.S. Decennial Census

=== 2010 census ===
At the 2010 census there were 1,349 people, 576 households, and 400 families living in the town. The population density was 32.9 inhabitants per square mile (12.7/km^{2}). There were 658 housing units at an average density of 16.0 per square mile (6.2/km^{2}). The racial makeup of the town was 98.8% White, 0.1% African American, 0.4% Native American, 0.3% Asian, and 0.4% from two or more races. Hispanic or Latino of any race were 0.2%.

Of the 576 households 26.9% had children under the age of 18 living with them, 56.1% were married couples living together, 8.0% had a female householder with no husband present, 5.4% had a male householder with no wife present, and 30.6% were non-families. 24.1% of households were one person and 10.3% were one person aged 65 or older. The average household size was 2.34 and the average family size was 2.74.

The median age in the town was 47.8 years. 20.2% of residents were under the age of 18; 6.4% were between the ages of 18 and 24; 18.8% were from 25 to 44; 37.6% were from 45 to 64; and 17% were 65 or older. The gender makeup of the town was 49.7% male and 50.3% female.

=== 2000 census ===
At the 2000 census there were 1489 people, 587 households, and 437 families living in the town. The population density was 36.4 inhabitants per square mile (14.1/km^{2}). There were 651 housing units at an average density of 15.9 per square mile (6.1/km^{2}). The racial makeup of the town was 99.13% White, 0.07% African American, 0.27% Native American, 0.13% Asian, and 0.40% from two or more races. Hispanic or Latino of any race were 0.27%.

Of the 587 households 35.3% had children under the age of 18 living with them, 64.1% were married couples living together, 5.8% had a female householder with no husband present, and 25.4% were non-families. 20.8% of households were one person and 7.0% were one person aged 65 or older. The average household size was 2.54 and the average family size was 2.92.

The age distribution was 24.9% under the age of 18, 6.5% from 18 to 24, 29.1% from 25 to 44, 29.1% from 45 to 64, and 10.4% 65 or older. The median age was 39 years. For every 100 females there were 111.2 males. For every 100 females age 18 and over, there were 104.8 males.

The median household income was $33,646 and the median family income was $40,063. Males had a median income of $42,353 versus $18,917 for females. The per capita income for the town was $15,264. About 8.6% of families and 11.5% of the population were below the poverty line, including 12.4% of those under age 18 and 11.2% of those age 65 or over.

== Historic buildings ==
The Congregational Church of Medway (1874), designed and built by Mansford Cushman, is listed on the National Register of Historic Places.

== Education ==
East Millinocket Schools operates public schools serving the community. Medway Middle School is located in Medway. Opal Myrick Elementary School and Schenck High School occupy one campus in East Millinocket.

== Notable person ==
- Michael Michaud, former U.S. Representative
