= Passamaquoddy Indian Township Reservation =

Indian reservation in Maine, United States

Coordinates: 45°15′56″N 67°36′44″W

Indian Township Motahkomikuk
- Indian reservation
- Passamaquoddy Indian Township Reservation
- Tribe: Passamaquoddy
- Country: United States
- State: Maine
- County: Washington

Government
  - Type: Tribal Council
  - Chief: William J. Nicholas Sr.
  - Vice Chief: Joseph Socobasin
  - Council Members: Matthew Dana II; Wade Lola; Alexander Nicholas I Mihku Sabattus; Richard Sabattus; Roger Socobasin

Area
  - Total: 112.5 km^{2} (43.4 sq mi)
  - Land: 97.0 km^{2} (37.5 sq mi)
  - Water: 15.5 km^{2} (6.0 sq mi) 13.8%
- Elevation: 68 m (223 ft)

Population (2020)
  - Total: 760
  - Density: 7.8/km^{2} (20/sq mi)
- Time zone: EST
- Postal code: 04668
- Website: https://www.passamaquoddy.com

Passamaquoddy Indian Township Reservation (Maliseet-Passamaquoddy: Motahkomikuk) is one of two Indian reservations of the federally recognized Passamaquoddy tribe in Washington County, Maine, United States. The population was 760 at the 2020 census. Most of the 2,500 members of the tribe in the United States live in other parts of Maine. The reservation is located about 13 miles (21 km) west-northwest of the city of Calais.

The Passamaquoddy also reside on the Pleasant Point Reservation.

== Geography ==
According to the United States Census Bureau, the Indian Township reservation has a total area of 112.5 km^{2} (43.4 sq mi). 97.0 km^{2} (37.5 sq mi) of it is land and 15.5 km^{2} (6.0 sq mi) of it (13.77%) is water. The Indian Health Service maintains a facility at Peter Dana Point.

== Demographics ==
Historical population
Census	Pop.	Note	%±
1940	328		—
1950	354		7.9%
1960	330		−6.8%
1970	293		−11.2%
1980	423		44.4%
1990	617		45.9%
2000	676		9.6%
2010	718		6.2%
2020	760		5.8%
U.S. Decennial Census

Languages (2000)	Percent
Spoke English at home	61.89%
Spoke Malecite-Passamaquoddy at home	30.13%
Spoke an unspecified Native American Language at home	7.98%

As of the census of 2000, there were 676 people, 232 households, and 164 families residing in the Indian reservation. The population density was 18.1/mi^{2} (7.0/km^{2}). There were 261 housing units at an average density of 7.0 units per square mile (2.7 units/km^{2}). The racial makeup of the Indian reservation was 11.54% White, 83.43% Native American, and 5.03% from two or more races. Hispanic or Latino of any race were 0.74% of the population.

There were 232 households, out of which 48.3% had children under the age of 18 living with them, 35.8% were married couples living together, 23.3% had a female householder with no husband present, and 28.9% were non-families. 25.0% of all households were made up of individuals, and 7.8% had someone living alone who was 65 years of age or older. The average household size was 2.91 and the average family size was 3.40.

In the Indian reservation the population was spread out, with 40.5% under the age of 18, 9.8% from 18 to 24, 30.2% from 25 to 44, 14.3% from 45 to 64, and 5.2% who were 65 years of age or older. The median age was 25 years. For every 100 females there were 107.4 males. For every 100 females age 18 and over, there were 95.1 males.

The median income for a household in the Indian reservation was $23,125, and the median income for a family was $28,654. Males had a median income of $21,696 versus $24,271 for females. The per capita income for the Indian reservation was $10,808. About 23.0% of families and 24.6% of the population were below the poverty line, including 22.5% of those under age 18 and 27.8% of those age 65 or over.

== Education ==
It is in the Indian Township School District, which represents Indian Township School, one of Maine's three schools for Native Americans. As of 1976 any children who are not enrolled in a Native American tribe would be sent to a school in Princeton, Maine.

The Maine Department of Education takes responsibility for coordinating school assignments on this reservation. The department instructs residents to contact the director for information on what school assignments would occur in the area.

== Notable residents ==
- Jeremy Frey, MacArthur Fellowship recipient and basket maker
- Mary Mitchell Gabriel (1908–2004), basket maker
- Tomah Joseph (1837–1914), governor, guide, and artist
- Geo Neptune, basket maker
- Molly Neptune Parker, basket maker
