= Passamaquoddy Pleasant Point Reservation =

Native American Reservation in the state of Maine, United States

Coordinates: 44°57′18″N 67°02′44″W

Pleasant Point Sipayik
- Indian reservation
- Passamaquoddy Pleasant Point Reservation
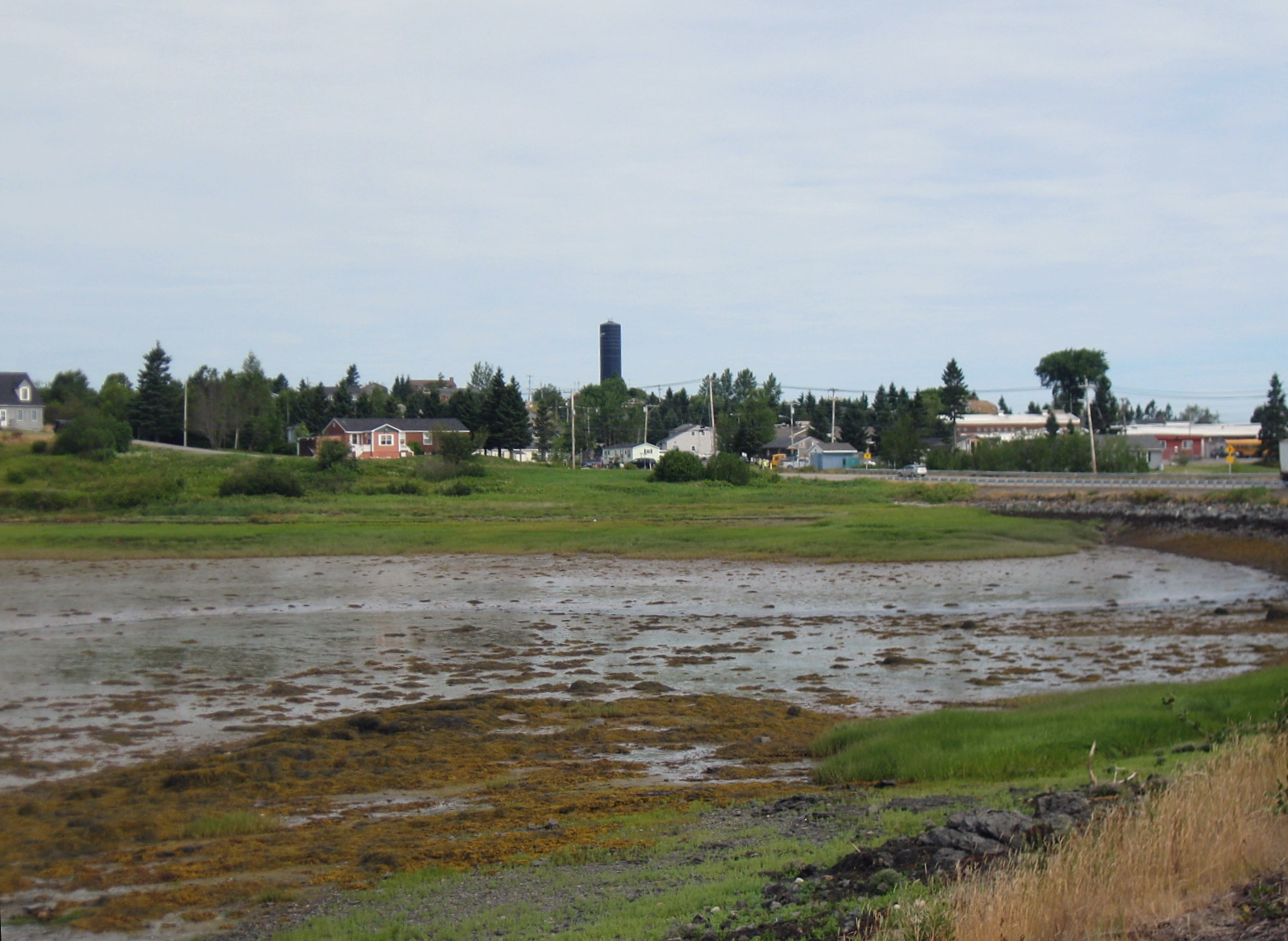

- Seal

- Tribe: Passamaquoddy
- Country: United States
- State: Maine
- County: Washington

Government
  - Type: Tribal Council
  - Chief: Maggie Dana
  - Vice Chief: Ernie Neptune
  - Council Members: Ryan Currier; Dylan Francis; Pamela Francis; Denise Altvater; Pos Bassett

Area
  - Total: 1.6 km^{2} (0.62 sq mi)
- Elevation: 16 m (52 ft)

Population (2020)
  - Total: 692
  - Density: 430/km^{2} (1,100/sq mi)
- Time zone: EST
- Postal code: 04667
- Website: https://www.wabanaki.com

Passamaquoddy Pleasant Point Reservation (Maliseet-Passamaquoddy: Sipayik) is one of two reservations of the federally recognized Passamaquoddy tribe in Washington County, Maine, United States. The population was 692 as of the 2020 census.

The Passamaquoddy also reside on the Indian Township Reservation.

== Geography ==
Sipayik is located near the Canada–United States border in Washington County, Maine on a peninsula with the Little River and Passamaquoddy Bay to the east and Cobscook Bay to the west. It borders Eastport and Perry, and has a total area of 0.6 mi^{2} (1.6 km^{2}).

== Demographics ==
Historical population
Census	Pop.	Note	%±
1970	307		—
1980	549		78.8%
1990	572		4.2%
2000	640		11.9%
2010	749		17.0%
2020	692		−7.6%
U.S. Decennial Census

The ACS estimates 683 people and 258 households at Sipayik in 2019. Passamaquoddy tribal census rolls report a total of 2,005 tribal members, while the ACS estimates 683 people lived in 258 households at Sipayik in 2019, of whom 84% were native and 12% were white. Median household income was $26,429, with 43.6% of the population below the poverty line, including 58.3% of those under age 18.

== Drinking water crisis ==
=== Passamaquoddy Water District ===
Sipayik's municipal water is provided by the Passamaquoddy Water District (PWD). Despite incorporating the tribe in its name, PWD is not tribally affiliated; it is a state-chartered quasi-municipal corporation created by the Maine Legislature in an emergency act in 1983. PWD is governed by an independent board of trustees and an executive director, and serves slightly over 600 households in Perry, Eastport and Sipayik, Maine. The PWD is responsible for infrastructure at the water source, a water tower at Sipayik, and facilities in Eastport.

PWD water comes from the Boyden Reservoir in Perry, a shallow body that is only 10–11 feet deep at its deepest point. Since it is a shallow, surface-water source, the water contains high amounts of organic matter that are exacerbated by weather events and routine system maintenance procedures. When chlorine is used to treat water containing organic matter, the disinfection by-product trihalomethane (THM) forms. Acute exposure to large doses of THMs can cause liver damage and central nervous system depression in humans, and laboratory animal studies of chronic low-dose exposure suggest that THMs may be carcinogenic. PWD water testing has revealed high levels of THM since testing for disinfection by-products began following the Safe Drinking Water Act (SDWA) of 1974. Between 1977 and 1981, THM levels in PWD water were three to four times the United States Environmental Protection Agency (EPA) Maximum Contaminant Level (MCL). Levels exceeding the MCL were recorded again in 2005 and 2017, and in both 2018 and 2019 THM concentrations were above the MCL for three out of the four quarters of the year. Boyden Reservoir's water level continues to decrease, causing the levels of organic matter to rise along with the amount of chlorine needed to treat the supply. PWD's treatment facility has seen $14.9 million worth of upgrades since 2000, and state officials reported in August 2020 that the water test results were within federal regulatory limits. This is disputed by tribal documents.

=== Resident experience ===
Since 2000, residents of Sipayik have received 49 public notices on water quality, 22 of which warned of unsafe levels of THM and haloacetic acids and stated that these contaminants can lead to "liver, kidney, and central nervous system problems and an increased risk of cancer.” The water is frequently discolored and odorous, and runs black, brown and green when weather events or routine maintenance procedures cause excess turbidity in the reservoir.

Though most Sipayik residents do not drink the PWD tap water, it is commonly used for other needs such as bathing and household cleaning. Because THMs vaporize at room temperature and can be inhaled and absorbed through the skin, it is likely that even the Sipayik residents who avoid drinking the tap water are still subject to chronic THM exposure.

=== Barriers to safe water ===
The ability of the Passamaquoddy Tribe to implement solutions to the PWD water crisis is limited because Maine does not grant tribes the ability to regulate and permit water resources independent of the state. A bill was introduced to the 129th Maine legislature to amend Maine's tribal sovereignty law, but the legislature had not taken it up by the time it adjourned due to the COVID-19 pandemic. Also, the PWD is the only public water utility in Maine that is not tax-exempt. Due to this and its limited customer base, there has not been adequate funding for infrastructure repairs that could improve drinking water quality.

Efforts to develop wells as alternatives to the PWD system and reservoir have met resistance. In 2014, the Passamaquoddy Tribe drilled a well on a parcel of their land in Perry, Maine. After initial testing of the well negatively impacted other wells in the area, the town of Perry passed an ordinance limiting activity on the new well, and the project was halted. In 2020, state regulations also prevented the tribe from independently testing and permitting a well for the new Sipayik Elementary School. The Passamaquoddy Tribe successfully obtained permits and dug a hand-pumped well from which people in need of clean drinking water can fill storage jugs in the fall of 2020.

=== Solutions ===
In November 2019, the Passamaquoddy Tribe of Pleasant Point received a $30,000 grant from the United States Environmental Protection Agency for water studies and testing, community outreach, reporting and action plan development. The EPA has recommended testing in a wider variety of the PWD's service area and is helping to institute more regular testing of the water.

In early 2020, Passamaquoddy leaders assembled a group of stakeholders in the water crisis to began developing short-, middle- and long-term solutions and to increase water testing at Sipayik. The group includes tribal leaders, PWD leaders, state water officials, EPA Region 1 representatives, and individuals from other municipalities. Tribal leaders expressed a desire to understand exactly what is in the water, to have more routine testing of the PWD system take place at Sipayik as opposed to the neighboring towns of Perry or Eastport, and to establish institutional partnerships to study the health impacts of the PWD water.

As of late September 2020, the stakeholder group had held three meetings during which the State of Maine acknowledged an ongoing public health crisis at Sipayik and pledged to aid in solutions. A state grant program has been announced to address imminent public health threats, and PWD will use the first grant for a one-year pilot project: A granular activated carbon water purification system will be installed to treat the water after the existing PWD treatment. Administration of the 2019 EPA grant, focused on feasibility studies for alternative water supplies, continues; and the tribe is waiting on state permits to install a roadside well using funding from the CARES act.

== Education ==
Its school district is the Pleasant Point School District, which stands for Sipayik Elementary School (formerly Beatrice Rafferty School), one of Maine's three schools for Native Americans. High schools which take students from this school include Calais High School, Shead High School, St. Croix Tech Center, and Washington Academy.

The Maine Department of Education takes responsibility for coordinating school assignments on this reservation. The department instructs residents to contact the director for information on what school assignments would occur in the area.

== Notable people ==
- Melvin Francis (1945–2006), reservation governor
