= East Millinocket, Maine =

Town in Maine, United States

- Town
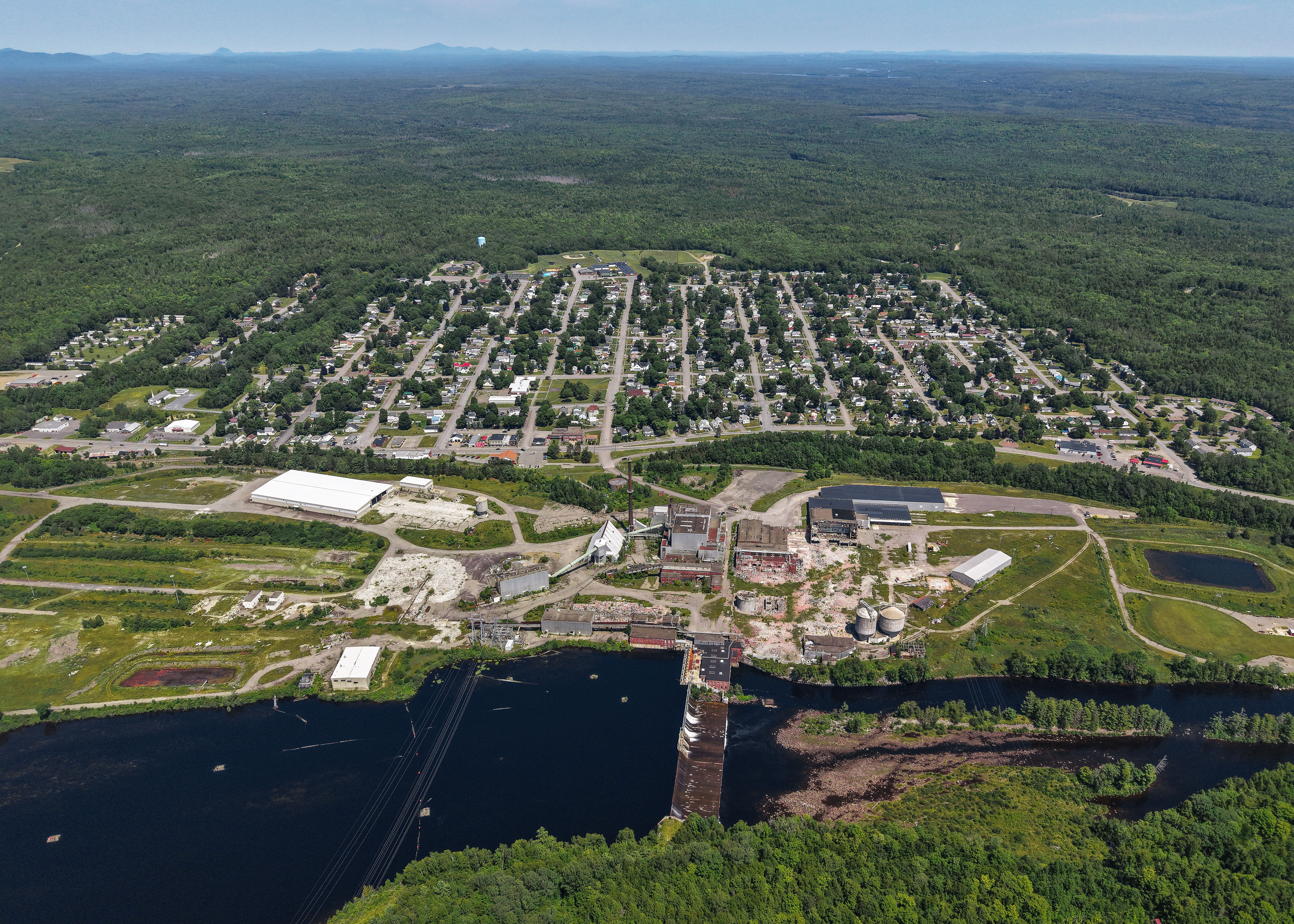
- Aerial view (2026)

- Seal
- Nickname: "The Town That Paper Made"
- Location within Maine Location within the United States
- Coordinates: 45°38′10″N 68°34′42″W
- Country: United States
- State: Maine
- County: Penobscot

Area
  - Total: 7.81 sq mi (20.23 km^{2})
  - Land: 7.10 sq mi (18.39 km^{2})
  - Water: 0.71 sq mi (1.84 km^{2})
- Elevation: 427 ft (130 m)

Population (2020)
  - Total: 1,572
  - Density: 221/sq mi (85.5/km^{2})
- Time zone: UTC-5 (Eastern (EST))
  - Summer (DST): UTC-4 (EDT)
- ZIP code: 04430
- Area code: 207
- GNIS feature ID: 582458
- Website: www.eastmillinocket.org

East Millinocket is a town in Penobscot County, Maine, United States. The population was 1,572 at the 2020 census. It contains a census-designated place of the same name.

== Geography ==
According to the United States Census Bureau, the town has a total area of 7.81 square miles (20.23 km^{2}), of which 7.10 square miles (18.39 km^{2}) is land and 0.71 square miles (1.84 km^{2}) is water.

== Demographics ==
Historical population
Census	Pop.	Note	%±
1910	923		—
1920	1,392		50.8%
1930	1,593		14.4%
1940	1,663		4.4%
1950	1,358		−18.3%
1960	2,392		76.1%
1970	2,567		7.3%
1980	2,372		−7.6%
1990	2,166		−8.7%
2000	1,828		−15.6%
2010	1,723		−5.7%
2020	1,572		−8.8%
U.S. Decennial Census

=== 2010 census ===
As of the census of 2010, there were 1,723 people, 768 households, and 492 families living in the town. The population density was 242.7 inhabitants per square mile (93.7/km^{2}). There were 871 housing units at an average density of 122.7 per square mile (47.4/km^{2}). The racial makeup of the town was 97.3% White, 0.2% African American, 0.8% Native American, 0.3% Asian, 0.1% Pacific Islander, 0.5% from other races, and 0.8% from two or more races. Hispanic or Latino of any race were 0.8% of the population.

There were 768 households, of which 23.7% had children under the age of 18 living with them, 49.1% were married couples living together, 10.5% had a female householder with no husband present, 4.4% had a male householder with no wife present, and 35.9% were non-families. 31.3% of all households were made up of individuals, and 16.9% had someone living alone who was 65 years of age or older. The average household size was 2.22 and the average family size was 2.73.

The median age in the town was 48.6 years. 20.5% of residents were under the age of 18; 5.4% were between the ages of 18 and 24; 18.6% were from 25 to 44; 32.6% were from 45 to 64; and 23% were 65 years of age or older. The gender makeup of the town was 49.2% male and 50.8% female.

=== 2000 census ===
As of the census of 2000, there were 1,828 people, 780 households, and 555 families living in the town. The population density was 256.4 inhabitants per square mile (99.0/km^{2}). There were 877 housing units at an average density of 123.0 per square mile (47.5/km^{2}). The racial makeup of the town was 98.30% White, 0.38% Native American, 0.38% Asian, 0.05% from other races, and 0.88% from two or more races. Hispanic or Latino of any race were 0.27% of the population.

There were 780 households, out of which 29.2% had children under the age of 18 living with them, 58.6% were married couples living together, 9.4% had a female householder with no husband present, and 28.8% were non-families. 26.3% of all households were made up of individuals, and 13.8% had someone living alone who was 65 years of age or older. The average household size was 2.34 and the average family size was 2.77.

In the town, the population was spread out, with 23.3% under the age of 18, 4.5% from 18 to 24, 25.6% from 25 to 44, 25.3% from 45 to 64, and 21.3% who were 65 years of age or older. The median age was 43 years. For every 100 females, there were 92.4 males. For every 100 females age 18 and over, there were 89.7 males.

The median income for a household in the town was $33,542, and the median income for a family was $42,857. Males had a median income of $46,645 versus $23,500 for females. The per capita income for the town was $19,343. About 11.5% of families and 13.5% of the population were below the poverty line, including 22.2% of those under age 18 and 5.9% of those age 65 or over.

== Education ==
East Millinocket Schools operates public schools serving the community. Opal Myrick Elementary School and Schenck High School occupy one campus in East Millinocket. In addition, the community is served by Medway Middle School in Medway.

The Katahdin Region Higher Education Center in East Millinocket provides higher education. The Eastern Maine Community College and the University of Maine System jointly established this center in 1987.
