= Neptune (disambiguation) =

Neptune is the eighth and farthest planet from the Sun.

Neptune commonly refers to:

- Neptune (mythology), a god in Ancient Roman mythology

Neptune may also refer to:

== Companies ==
- Neptune Computer Inc., a Canadian consumer electronics company
- Neptune Distribution, a UK comic distribution company
- Neptune Technology Group, a US water-metering equipment manufacturer owned by Roper Technologies
- Neptune Aviation, an aerial firefighting company

== Computing ==
- Neptune chipset, a code name for the Intel Pentium 430NX chip set
- Amazon Neptune, a graph database product
- Sega Neptune, a planned Sega console that was never produced
- Sun Neptune, a Sun network interface card
- Windows Neptune, an unreleased version of Microsoft Windows

== Film and television ==
- Neptune, California, a fictional location in Veronica Mars
- Neptune, a fictional submarine in For Your Eyes Only
- USS Neptune, a fictional submarine in Gray Lady Down
- King Neptune, a character in the SpongeBob SquarePants series
- Neptune Vasilias, a character in RWBY, an anime-influenced web series
- The Neptunes, the fictional band in Jabberjaw

== Literature ==
- Neptune (Marvel Comics), a Marvel Comics character
- Sailor Neptune or Michiru Kaioh, a character in the Sailor Moon franchise
- Neptune, a comic book in the Worlds of Aldebaran comic book series

== Music ==
=== Bands ===
- Neptune (Italian band), a band from Verona, Italy
- Neptune (American band), a scrap metal instrument and homemade electronics musical collective from Boston
- The Neptunes, a group of hip-hop producers
- Neptune Records, a record label

=== Albums ===
- Neptune (The Duke Spirit album)
- Neptune (Northern Pikes album)
- Neptune (Toshinobu Kubota album)

=== Songs ===
- "Neptune", a song by Azealia Banks and Shystie from Fantasea
- "Neptune", a 2003 song by InMe from Overgrown Eden
- "Neptune", a song by Sufjan Stevens, Bryce Dessner, Nico Muhly and James McAlister from Planetarium
- "Neptune", a song by English rock band Foals from Everything Not Saved Will Be Lost – Part 2

=== Classical ===
- "Neptune, the Mystic", a movement in Gustav Holst's The Planets suite
- Neptune - Poem of the Sea, an orchestral work by Cyril Scott

== People with the surname ==
- Francis Joseph Neptune (1735–1834), Passamaquoddy chief
- Geo Soctomah Neptune (born 1988), Passamaquoddy basket maker
- Old John Neptune (1767–1865), Penobscot leader
- Yvon Neptune (born 1946), 11th Prime minister of Haiti 2002–2004
- Molly Neptune Parker (1939–2020), Passamaquoddy basket maker
- Kyle Neptune (born 1985), basketball player and coach

== Places ==
=== Northern Hemisphere ===
- Neptune Beach, Florida, a beachfront city
- Neptune Township, New Jersey
- Neptune City, New Jersey, a borough
- Neptune, Ohio, an unincorporated township
- Neptune, West Virginia
- Neptune, Wisconsin

=== Southern Hemisphere ===
- Neptune Range, a mountain range in Antarctica
- Neptune Islands, an island group in South Australia

== Theatres ==
- Epstein Theatre, formerly Neptune Theatre, a theatre in the Liverpool, England, UK
- Neptune Theatre (Halifax), a theatre in Halifax, Nova Scotia, Canada
- Neptune Theatre (Seattle), a performing arts venue in Seattle, Washington, U.S.
- Neptune Theatre Restaurant, a defunct theatre-restaurant in Collyer Quay, Singapore

== Vehicles ==
=== Aircraft ===
- Beriev Be-2500 or Neptune, a super-heavy amphibian cargo aircraft
- DRS RQ-15 Neptune, an unmanned reconnaissance aerial vehicle
- Lockheed P-2 Neptune, a naval patrol bomber and anti-submarine warfare aircraft
- Spaceship Neptune, a high altitude tourist balloon set-up with the Neptune gondola and a hydrogen balloon to lift tourists to near the edge of space by Space Perspective

=== Ships ===
- Neptune (1780 ship), a convict ship in Second Fleet, to New South Wales
- Neptune (galleon), a 1986 ship replica built for Roman Polanski's film Pirates
- CS Neptune, a 1862 Confederate Army tugboat
- French ship Neptune, various ships of France named Neptune
  - French ship Neptune (1778), a 74-gun ship of the line
  - French ship Neptune (1803), a Tonnant-class ship of the line
  - French ship Neptune (1807), a brig launched in Venice
  - French ship Neptune (1839), an 80-gun ship of the line
  - French battleship Neptune, a Marceau-class ironclad built in 1892
- HMS Neptune, various ships of the British Royal Navy named Neptune
  - HMS Neptune (1683), a 90-gun second rate
  - HMS Neptune (1757), a 90-gun second rate
  - HMS Neptune (1797), a 98-gun second rate
  - HMS Neptune (1832), a 120-gun first rate
  - HMS Neptune (1878), an ironclad battleship acquired by the Royal Navy in 1878
  - HMS Neptune (1909), an early dreadnought launched
  - HMS Neptune (20), a Leander-class light cruiser
- HMNB Clyde or HMS Neptune, an operating base in the UK for the Royal Navy
- USS Neptune (ARC-2), a Neptune-class cable repair ship acquired by the US Navy in 1953
- USS Neptune, various ships of the U.S. Navy named Neptune
  - USS Clyde (1863), a 294-ton side-wheel steam gunboat briefly named Neptune
  - USS Neptune (1863), a 1244-ton screw steamship
  - USS Neptune (1869) or USS Manhattan, a monitor
  - USS Neptune (AC-8), a collier in World War I
- Neptune-class cruiser, a proposed class of cruisers planned for the British Royal Navy
- Neptune-class ship of the line, a class of second rate warships of the British Royal Navy

== Video games ==
- Hyperdimension Neptunia or Neptune, a role-playing video game series
  - Hyperdimension Neptunia (video game) or Neptune, the 2010 first game in the series
  - Neptune, a character in Hyperdimension Neptunia
- Neptune, a shark-like enemy in Resident Evil
- AFO Neptune, a task force in Medal of Honor

== Other uses ==
- NEPTUNE, an underwater observatory
- Neptune (collection), a fashion collection by Alexander McQueen
- R-360 Neptune, a Ukrainian cruise anti-ship missile
- Neptune (owarai), a Japanese comedy group
- Neptune Cable, a submarine HVDC cable in the New York area
- Neptune Cork, an Irish basketball team
- Neptune Terrace, a public housing estate in Chai Wan, Hong Kong
- WEKhilpurnil or Neptune, a hybrid Tea rose
- Portunes or Neptunes, creatures of English folklore

== See also ==
- Category:Neptune
- Eggs Neptune, a layered breakfast/brunch food
- King Neptune (disambiguation)
- Neptun (disambiguation)
- Neptune City (album), a 2007 album by Nicole Atkins
- Neptunium (Np), a chemical element, atomic number 93
- Operation Neptune (disambiguation)
- Spanish ship Neptuno, a list of ships of the Spanish Navy
