= Neptune (ship) =

Neptune may refer to a number of ships named for Neptune, the god of freshwater and the sea in Roman mythology.

== Warships ==
- HMS Neptune, any of several Royal Navy warships
- French ship Neptune, any of several French Navy warships
- Spanish ship Neptuno, any of several Spanish Navy warships
- USS Neptune, any of several United States Navy warships

== Merchant ships ==
- Neptune (~1740 ship), unknown tonnage, that made numerous passenger and supply passages from Europe to the colonial Americas under Captain Waire (also spelled Captain Ware in some records).
- Neptune (1780 ship), an 809-ton (bm) merchantman built in 1779, that was part of the Second Fleet
- Neptune (1785 ship), a 218-ton (bm) merchantman built in 1778 in America that made one voyage as a whaler and that was last listed in 1803.
- Neptune (1796 EIC ship), a 1468-ton (bm) East Indiaman that made eight voyages for the British East India Company (EIC)
- Neptune (1797 ship) was the first ship built in Quebec after the British occupation. She sailed to England where she became a West Indiaman. A French privateer captured her in 1809.
- Neptune (1805 ship) was launched as a West Indiaman. A French privateer captured her in 1809 but passengers and some disaffected members of the prize crew recaptured her. She returned to the West Indies trade and foundered on 4 February 1825, while returning to Liverpool from New Orleans.
- Neptune (1808 Quebec ship), of 554/5 tons (bm) and 126', was built by John Munn.
- Neptune (1810 ship), a 477-ton (bm) merchantman built in 1810. She made two voyages transporting convicts to Australia before she was broken up at Cape Town after being condemned as unseaworthy.
- Neptune (1815 ship) made one voyage for the EIC, and later two voyages transporting convicts to Van Diemen's Land.
- Neptune (1836 ship) made one voyage transporting convicts to New South Wales. Last listed 1845.
- PS Neptune (1850), was a Dumbarton-built passenger ship on St Petersburg-Cronstadt ferry service
- PS Neptune (1861), a Clyde passenger steamer that became a Civil War blockade runner and was later USS Clyde

== See also ==
- Neptun (ship)
- Neptuno (ship)
