= Neptuno =

Neptuno may refer to the following:

- BM Neptuno, a former professional handball team in Madrid, Spain
- Neptuno (planet), the eighth planet from the Sun
- Neptuno (ship), list of ships named Neptuno
  - Spanish ship Neptuno, a list of ships
- Neptuno metro station, Santiago, Chile
- Project Neptuno, a water infrastructure development project in Uruguay
- Neptuno Films, a defunct Spanish animation studio

== See also ==
- Neptun (disambiguation)
- Neptune (disambiguation)
