= List of shipwrecks in December 1865 =

The list of shipwrecks in December 1865 includes ships sunk, foundered, grounded, or otherwise lost during December 1865.

== 1 December ==
List of shipwrecks: 1 December 1865
Ship	State	Description
Dane	United Kingdom	The steamship was wrecked at Cape Recife, Cape Colony. All on board were rescued. She was on a voyage from Simons Bay to Zanzibar.
Ed Air	United States	The 35-ton screw steamer was stranded at Big Bone, Kentucky.
Esterios	Flag unknown	The schooner was wrecked in the Kowie River, Cape Colony. She was on a voyage from Grahamstown, Cape Colony to London, United Kingdom.
Loyalist	United Kingdom	The schooner was destroyed by fire at Holmes Hole, Massachusetts, United States. She was on a voyage from Wareham, Dorset to New York, United States.
P. Breman	United Kingdom	The ship was wrecked at Antigonish, Nova Scotia, British North America. She was on a voyage from Chatham, New Brunswick, British North America to Liverpool, Lancashire.
Progress	United States	The sidewheel paddle steamer sank in the Arkansas River in Arkansas with the loss of 20 lives.
HMS Research	Royal Navy	The Camelion-class sloop ran aground at Harrington Point, County Waterford. She was refloated the next day and sailed for Portsmouth, Hampshire.
Sarnia	(United Kingdom of Great Britain and Ireland) British North America	The barque was driven ashore east of Swansea, Glamorgan. She was on a voyage from Cork to Cardiff, Glamorgan. She was refloated the next day and towed in to Swansea.
Uncas	United Kingdom	The full-rigged ship collided with the steamship Mæander (United Kingdom) and sank off the Tusker Rock. Her crew were rescued by Mæander. Uncas was on a voyage from Callao, Peru to Liverpool, Lancashire.

== 2 December ==
List of shipwrecks: 2 December 1865
Ship	State	Description
Broughty Castle	United Kingdom	The schooner struck a sunken rock off Inchkeith, Fife. She was on a voyage from Perth to London. She put in to Granton, Lothian the next day in a severely leaky condition.
Dart	United Kingdom	The schooner ran aground on the wreck of the steamship London (United Kingdom) in the Firth of Tay and was severely damaged. She was on a voyage from Königsberg, Prussia to Dundee, Forfarshire. She was refloated and taken in to Dundee in a severely leaky condition.
Marsh	United Kingdom	The barque was driven ashore and wrecked near Maitland, Nova Scotia. British North America. Her crew were rescued. She was on a voyage from Toledo to Kingston.
Sophia	(United Kingdom of Great Britain and Ireland) British North America	The brigantine was driven ashore and wrecked at "La Hava", Nova Scotia. She was on a voyage from Puerto Rico to Halifax, Nova Scotia.

== 3 December ==
List of shipwrecks: 3 December 1865
Ship	State	Description
Indian River	United States	The 250-ton sidewheel paddle steamer ran aground at the mouth of the Indian River on the coast of Florida.
Consul Parry	Prussia	The brig ran aground and was severely damaged at Sunderland, County Durham, United Kingdom. She was on a voyage from Danzig to Sunderland.
Gipsey	United Kingdom	The barque sank off Negropont, Greece with the loss of eight of her eleven crew.
Harriett	United Kingdom	The brig ran aground on the Herd Sand, in the North Sea off the coast of County Durham. Her crew were rescued by the South Shields Lifeboat. She was on a voyage from Plymouth, Devon to South Shields, County Durham. She had become a wreck by 5 December.

== 4 December ==
List of shipwrecks: 4 December 1865
Ship	State	Description
Christiana	United Kingdom	The schooner collided with the smack United Friends (United Kingdom) and sank off the Cork Lightship ( Trinity House). Her crew were rescued by United Friends, which was severely damaged. Christiana was on a voyage from Ipswich, Suffolk to Scarborough, Yorkshire. She was refloated on 16 December and taken in to Harwich, Essex.
Congress	United States	The ship was driven ashore at Calais, France. . She was on a voyage from London, United Kingdom to China.
Dolphin	United Kingdom	The ship was severely damaged at South Shields, County Durham when the brig Halcyon (United Kingdom) heeled over onto her.
Dresden	United States	The ship departed from Belfast, County Antrim, United Kingdom for Boston, Massachusetts. No further trace, presumed foundered in the Atlantic Ocean with the loss of all hands.
Eagle	United Kingdom	The brig ran aground on the Corton Sand, in the North Sea off the coast of Suffolk. She was on a voyage from Vyborg, Grand Duchy of Finland to Gosport, Hampshire. She was refloated on 8 December and taken in to Lowestoft, Suffolk.
Harmony	United Kingdom	The ship ran aground on the Well Bank and was abandoned by her crew. They were rescued by the barque Æquivalent (Norway). Harmony was on a voyage from Danzig to London. She was subsequently discovered in the Dogger Bank and was towed in to South Shields by the tugs Rapin and Robin Hood (both United Kingdom).
Herschel	United Kingdom	The steamship was wrecked at Maldonado, Uruguay. All on board were rescued.
Hound	United Kingdom	The fishing smack was abandoned in the English Channel off Start Point, Devon. Her crew were rescued by Union (United Kingdom). Hound was on a voyage from Le Havre, Seine-Inférieure, France to Falmouth, Cornwall.
James Lamb	United Kingdom	The barque was abandoned in the Atlantic Ocean. Her crew were rescued by Hooghly (United Kingdom). James Lamb was on a voyage from Demerara, British Guiana to London. She was subsequently discovered by Queen of the South (United Kingdom), which put six crew on board with the intention of taking her in to Queenstown, County Cork.
Lymons	United Kingdom	The ship was driven ashore on "Bondy Island" before 5 December. She was on a voyage from Liverpool, Lancashire to Baltimore, Maryland, United States.
Matthewan	United Kingdom	The ship collided with the lugger Hjorne (France) and sank. she was on a voyage from Rotterdam, South Holland, Netherlands to Cardiff, Glamorgan.
Rover	United Kingdom	The brig ran aground on the Elbow End Sand, off the mouth of the River Tay. She was refloated and taken in to Dundee, Forfarshire in a leaky condition.

== 5 December ==
List of shipwrecks: 5 December 1865
Ship	State	Description
Corsair	United Kingdom	The ship was driven ashore and wrecked 2 nautical miles (3.7 km) north of Saint John's, Newfoundland, British North America. She was on a voyage from Saint John's to Bristol, Gloucestershire.
Marie Jenny	France	The schooner was driven ashore and wrecked near "Labilderat". Her crew were rescued. She was on a voyage from an English port to Brest, Finistère.
Neptune	United States	The 1,244-ton screw steamer was stranded in fog off Long Island, New York.

== 6 December ==
List of shipwrecks: 6 December 1865
Ship	State	Description
Barbadian	United Kingdom	The steamship was wrecked on the Blackwater Bank, in the Irish Sea off the coast of County Wexford with the loss of one of the 40 people on board. Twenty-five people reached shore in boats, the rest were rescued by the Rosslare and Wexford Lifeboats. She was on a voyage from Liverpool, Lancashire to Barbados.
Benjamin	United Kingdom	The Humber Keel sank in the Humber at Hull, Yorkshire.
D'Alberti	United Kingdom	The brig sprang a leak and was beached 10 nautical miles (19 km) west of Montauk Point, New York, United StatesShe was on a voyage from New York City to Guadeloupe.
Invergordon	United Kingdom	The ship ran aground on the Bredegrund, in the Baltic Sea. She was on a voyage from Riga, Russia to London. She was refloated and taken in to Copenhagen, Denmark.
Leander	United Kingdom	The paddle tug collided with Harmony (United Kingdom) and sank off Tynemouth, Northumberland. Her four crew were rescued by Harmony.
Pioneer	United Kingdom	The schooner was wrecked in the River Tay.
Princess	United Kingdom	The ship was wrecked on the Abertay Sand, at the mouth of the River Tay with the loss of all five crew. She was on a voyage from London to Dundee, Forfarshire.
Seraphina	United Kingdom	The lugger ran aground on the Newcombe Sand, in the North Sea off the coast of Suffolk. She was on a voyage from London to Sunderland, County Durham. She was refloated and taken in to Lowestoft, Suffolf.
Sioux City	United States	The 379-ton sidewheel paddle steamer foundered in the Mississippi River at St. Louis, Missouri. She later was refloated.
Vivid	United Kingdom	The Humber Keel was run into another Humber Keel and sank in the Humber at the mouth of the River Hull. All on board were rescued by a French vessel.

== 7 December ==
List of shipwrecks: 7 December 1865
Ship	State	Description
Blue Bell	United Kingdom	The schooner was damaged by fire at Aberdeen.
Casilda	United States	The ship was destroyed by fire in the Atlantic Ocean. Her crew were rescued by Caravan (United Kingdom). Casilda was on a voyage from Liverpool to Mobile, Alabama.
Cranefoot	United Kingdom	The brig was wrecked in St. George's Bay, Nova Scotia, British North America.
Firefly	United Kingdom	The steamship was driven ashore at Holkham, Norfolk. She was on a voyage from South Shields, County Durham to London. She was refloated and resumed her voyage.
Hope	United Kingdom	The Mersey Flat collided with the steamship Belgian (United Kingdom) and sank in the River Mersey. She was refloated on 10 December and beached at Woodside, Cheshire.
Jane McDonald	United Kingdom	The schooner ran aground on Scroby Sands, Norfolk. She was on a voyage from Ystad, Sweden to London. She was refloated and assisted in to Great Yarmouth, Norfolk.
Jenny	Netherlands	The galiot abandoned in the North Sea. Her crew were rescued by a fishing boat. She was driven ashore at Cairnbulg, Aberdeenshire, United Kingdom. She was on a voyage from Newcastle upon Tyne, Northumberland, United Kingdom to Lisbon, Portugal.
Marquis of Bute	United Kingdom	The barque was driven ashore at Rhymney, Glamorgan. She was refloated and taken in to Penarth, Glamorgan in a severely damaged condition.
Neptunus	Stralsund	The ship was driven ashore at Darßser Ort. She was on a voyage from the River Tyne to Swinemünde, Prussia. She was refloated the next day and towed in to Stralsund for repairs.
Onulaska	United Kingdom	The ship departed from Milford Haven, Pembrokeshire for Saint John, New Brunswick, British North America. No further trace, presumed foundered with the loss of all hands.

== 8 December ==
List of shipwrecks: 8 December 1865
Ship	State	Description
Daniel O'Connell	United Kingdom	The schooner was driven ashore in Dundrum Bay. Five crew were rescued by the Tyrella Lifeboat. She was on a voyage from Liverpool, Lancashire to Newry, County Antrim.
Gem of the Ocean	United Kingdom	The ship struck the Runnel Stone. She was on a voyage from Penzance to Saint Ives, Cornwall. She was taken in tow, but consequently foundered. Her crew were rescued.
Gertrude	United Kingdom	The steamship ran aground off the Lista Lighthouse, Norway. Her crew were rescued. She was on a voyage from Leith, Lothian to Stettin. She had broken in two by 12 December and was a total loss.
Navigator	United Kingdom	The ship ran aground on the Niding Reef, in the Baltic Sea. She was on a voyage from Vindava, Courland Governorate to Grimsby, Lincolnshire. She was refloated and put in to Gothenburg, Sweden in a leaky condition.
Surprise	United Kingdom	The schooner was driven ashore at Stornoway, Isle of Lewis, Outer Hebrides. Her crew were rescued. She was on a voyage from Port Dinorwic, Caernarfonshire to Alloa, Clackmannanshire She had become a wreck by 28 December.
Trym	United Kingdom	The barque was driven ashore at Eskmeals, Cumberland. She was on a voyage from the British Cameroons to Liverpool. She was refloated in mid-December and resumed her voyage.
Wickopee	United States	The ship ran aground at Peel, Isle of Man. She was on a voyage from Liverpool to Charleston, South Carolina.

== 9 December ==
List of shipwrecks: 9 December 1865
Ship	State	Description
Brothers	United Kingdom	The brig was driven ashore in the Dardanelles. She was on a voyage from Brăila, Ottoman Empire to an English port.
Chevalier	United Kingdom	The ship ran aground off Crosby, Lancashire. She was refloated the next day and taken in to Liverpool, Lancashire.
Emma	United Kingdom	The ship was wrecked on "Cerito Island". Her crew were rescued. She was on a voyage from Ketch, Russia to Antwerp, Belgium. She was later refloated and taken in to Constantinople, Ottoman Empire, where she arrived on 25 December.
Forwartz	Prussia	The schooner was driven ashore in the Dardanelles.
Frederick	United Kingdom	The barque ran aground at Demerara, British Guiana. She was on a voyage from Demerara to Hartlepool, County Durham. She was refloated but had to be beached. Frederick canted over and was wrecked.
Gertrude	Norway	The ship was driven ashore near Farsund.
James Caskie	United Kingdom	The ship was sighted whilst on a voyage from Quebec City, Province of Canada, British North America to Stockton-on-Tees, County Durham. No further trace, presumed foundered with the loss of all hands.
Lord Mostyn	United Kingdom	The schooner collided with Eugenie (United Kingdom) and was beached at Tranmere, Cheshire.
Maitland	United Kingdom	The ship was driven ashore at Cullercoats, Northumberland. She was refloated and towed in to the River Tyne.
Maria	United Kingdom	The schooner was driven ashore north of Berwick upon Tweed, Northumberland. She was on a voyage from Leith, Lothian to Stockton-on-Tees. She was refloated and resumed her voyage.
Moderation	United Kingdom	The brig was driven ashore at Demerara, British Guiana. She was on a voyage from the Clyde to Demerara. She was refloated.
Phoenix	Norway	The barque was wrecked on the Jadder, in the North Sea. Her crew were rescued. She was on a voyage from London, United Kingdom to Arendal.
Seraphina	United Kingdom	The ship was driven ashore at Crosby. She was on a voyage from Pernambuco, Brazil to Liverpool.
Symbol	United Kingdom	The ship ran aground on Scroby Sands, Norfolk. She was refloated and resumed her voyage.
Tasmanian	United Kingdom	The full-rigged ship was wrecked on the Blackwater Bank, in the Irish Sea off the coast of County Wexford with the loss of all hands. She was on a voyage from Liverpool to Havana, Cuba.
Upland	Rostock	The brig was driven ashore and wrecked on Psara, Greece. Her crew were rescued. She was on a voyage from Mahón, Spain to Constantinople, Ottoman Empire.

== 10 December ==
List of shipwrecks: 10 December 1865
Ship	State	Description
Bosphorus	United Kingdom	The schooner ran aground on the Corton Sand, in the North Sea off the coast of Suffolk. She was on a voyage from South Shields, County Durham to London. She was refloated but found to be severely leaky.
Clelia	Flag unknown	The ship was driven ashore at "Winago". She was on a voyage from Havana, Cuba to Trieste.
Col. Allen	United States	The schooner was lost near Louisbourg, Nova Scotia. Crew saved.

== 11 December ==
List of shipwrecks: 11 December 1865
Ship	State	Description
Admiral	France	The ship collided with General Havelock (United Kingdom) in the Atlantic Ocean and was abandoned with the loss of a crew member. Survivors were rescued by General Havelock.
Canning	(United Kingdom of Great Britain and Ireland) British North America	The brigantine departed from Greenock, Renfrewshire for Barbados. No further trace, presumed foundered with the loss of all hands.
Charles	France	The ship departed from "Kneuel", Morbihan for Naples, Italy. No further trace, presumed foundered with the loss of all hands.
Fanny	Prussia	The brig ran aground at Swinemünde. She was on a voyage from Sunderland, County Durham, United Kingdom to Swinemünde. She was refloated on 15 December.
Lucy	United Kingdom	The ship ran aground on the Barber Sand, in the North Sea off the coast of Norfolk. She was later abandoned by her crew.
R. R. H.	(United Kingdom of Great Britain and Ireland) British North America	The brig was wrecked at Broad Cove, Nova Scotia. She was on a voyage from Charlottetown, Prince Edward Island to Liverpool, Lancashire.

== 12 December ==
List of shipwrecks: 12 December 1865
Ship	State	Description
Constitution	United States	The 944-ton screw steamer was wrecked at Cape Lookout, North Carolina with the loss of 40 lives.
Emilie Friederike	Prussia	The ship was abandoned off the coast of Norway. Her crew survived. She was on a voyage from Sunderland, County Durham, to Swinemünde.
Friedrich Overbeck	Lübeck	The ship schooner ran aground and was wrecked at Riga, Russia with the loss of two of her crew. She was on a voyage from Tayport, Fife, United Kingdom to Riga.
Pladda	United Kingdom	The ship was wrecked on the Cobblers Reef, off Barbados. Her crew were rescued. She was on a voyage from Ardrossan, Ayrshire to Barbados.
Ross D Mangles	United Kingdom	The ship ran ashore at Dunkirk, Nord. She was on a voyage from Dunkirk to Newcastle upon Tyne, Northumberland. She was later refloated.
HMS Sphynx	Royal Navy	The sloop of war was driven ashore on the coast of Jamaica. She was on a voyage from Kingston to Port Royal. Subsequently refloated, repaired and returned to service.
Summer Fly	United Kingdom	The schooner was severely damaged by fire in the River Mersey. She was on a voyage from Dénia, Spain to Liverpool, Lancashire. The fire was extinguished with assistance from the tug Cruiser (United Kingdom) and she was taken in to Liverpool.
Volunteer	United Kingdom	The schooner was run in to by the steamship Minerva (United Kingdom) and sank with the loss of four lives. She was on a voyage from Swansea, Glamorgan to Plymouth, Devon.

== 13 December ==
List of shipwrecks: 13 December 1865
Ship	State	Description
Ella	United States	The 173-ton sternwheel paddle steamer struck a snag and sank in the Arkansas River at Little Rock.
Emma	United Kingdom	The ship was driven ashore at Kavarna, Ottoman Empire. She was on a voyage from Sulina, Ottoman Empire to an English port. She was refloated the next day and resumed her voyage.
Fanny Buck, and Samphire	United States; United Kingdom	The steamship Samphire collided with the barque Fanny Buck in the English Channel 4.5 nautical miles (8.3 km) off Dover, Kent and was severely damaged at the bows with the loss of four lives. Survivors were rescued by La Belgique (Belgium). Samphire was on a voyage from Dover to Calais, France. She was towed in to Dover. Fanny Buck was on a voyage from Rotterdam, South Holland, Netherlands to Cardiff, Glamorgan, United Kingdom. Two of her crew had got on board Samphire and were rescued by La Belgique. She put in to Dover severely damaged at the bows
Hound	United Kingdom	The ship ran aground and sank off the coast of Brazil. Her crew survived. She was on a voyage from South Shields, County Durham to Pará, Brazil.
Juanita	Spain	The ship collided with the steamship Millbank (United Kingdom) and was beached at Gibraltar. She was on a voyage from Barcelona to Maranhão, Empire of Brazil. She was subsequently refloated and towed in to Gibraltar in a waterlogged condition.
Maas	Netherlands	The steamship ran aground near "Bueill". She was refloated and resumed her voyage.
Maid of the Yarra	Flag unknown	The steamer was wrecked just inside the mouth of New Zealand's Hokitika River. Her keel struck the bottom of the river's channel and she became unresponsive. A heavy sea was running, and breached over her. She became beached and it was found that she had been badly holed. All crew and passengers survived.
Ovington	United Kingdom	The paddle tug capsized and sank at Sunderland, County Durham. Her crew were rescued.
Palmar	Belgium	The ship was wrecked on "Balmahuy Island", Argyllshire, United Kingdom. Her captain was rescued.
William Edward Ashby	United States	The ship collided with the steamship Ariadne (United States) and sank off Barnegat, New Jersey. She was on a voyage from Le Havre, Seine-Inférieure, France to New York.

== 14 December ==
List of shipwrecks: 14 December 1865
Ship	State	Description
Anne Laity Banfield	United Kingdom	The full-rigged ship ran aground on the Scallmartin Rocks, in the Belfast Lough. She was on a voyage from the Clyde to Montevideo, Uruguay. She was refloated on 16 December and towed in to Belfast, County Antrim by two tugs.
Ayrshire	United Kingdom	The barque was driven ashore and wrecked on Muckle Roe, Shetland Islands. Her crew survived. She was on a voyage from Quebec City, Province of Canada, British North America to Dundee, Forfarshire.
Ino	United Kingdom	The schooner ran aground on the Maplin Sand, in the North Sea off the coast of Essex. She was refloated with the assistance of a smack and a tug and taken in to Southend-on-Sea, Essex.
Lucy	United Kingdom	The brig ran aground on the Barber Sand, in the North Sea off the coast of Norfolk.
Margaret	United Kingdom	The fishing trawler collided with the steamship Tuskar (United Kingdom) and sank 3 nautical miles (5.6 km) south west of Lambay Island, County Dublin. Her four crew survived.
Zwarte Dost	Netherlands	The ship was driven ashore and wrecked in the Pinke Gat. Her crew were rescued. She was on a voyage from Newcastle upon Tyne, Northumberland, United Kingdom to Groningen.

== 15 December ==
List of shipwrecks: 15 December 1865
Ship	State	Description
Ada	United Kingdom	The ship ran aground at Aberdeen. She was on a voyage from Aberdeen to Hong Kong. She was refloated the next day and resumed her voyage.
Albion	United Kingdom	The schooner sprang a leak and foundered in Bridlington Bay. Her crew were rescued by the steamship Hastings (United Kingdom). Albion was on a voyage from Stockton-on-Tees, County Durham to Perth.
Amphitrite	United Kingdom	The brig was driven ashore and wrecked at Winterton-on-Sea, Norfolk, having been abandoned by her crew. She was on a voyage from South Shields, County Durham to Chatham, Kent.
Britannia	United Kingdom	The ship collided with a brig and sank in the English Channel off St Alban's Head, Dorset. Her crew were rescued. She was on a voyage from Yarmouth, Isle of Wight to Plymouth, Devon.
Camilla	United Kingdom	The brig foundered off Folkestone, Kent. Her crew were rescued. She was on a voyage from Sunderland, County Durham, to Fécamp, Seine-Inférieure, France.
Delogate	France	The schooner sank in the Mediterranean Sea. Her crew were rescued by the steamship Massina (United Kingdom).
Duchess of Portland	United Kingdom	The ship was beached at Flamborough Head, Yorkshire. She was on a voyage from South Shields to London. She was refloated and taken in to Bridlington, Yorkshire.
Dunkfaskeil	Bremen	The ship was driven ashore at Gröde, Duchy of Holstein. She was on a voyage from Bremen to an English port.
Hawk	United Kingdom	The smack was driven ashore at Caernarfon. She was on a voyage from Liverpool, Lancashire to Barmouth, Merionethshire. She was refloated the next day and taken in to Caernarfon.
Jens Nordentoffs	Denmark	The ship was driven ashore at Hals.
Ludgemas	Sweden	The barque ran aground on the Longsand, in the North Sea off the coast of Essex, United Kingdom. She was on a voyage from Stockholm to Smyrna, Ottoman Empire. She was refloated with the assistance of some smacks and assisted in to Harwich, Essex.
Margarethe	Netherlands	The ship was wrecked at Thorup, Denmark. Her crew were rescued. She was on a voyage from Riga, Russia to Bordeaux, Gironde, France.
Nancy	United Kingdom	The sloop was wrecked at Runswick, Yorkshire with the loss of all three people on board.
Norsomheden	Danzig	The ship was wrecked near "Fairwater". She was on a voyage from Danzig to Kristiansand, Norway.
Peerless	United States	The 227-ton sidewheel paddle steamer capsized and burned after striking the wreck of the gunboat USS Black Hawk (United States Navy) in the Ohio River 3 nautical miles (5.6 km) upstream of Cairo, Illinois.
St. Anne	France	The lugger sank off "Portzall". Her crew were rescued. She was on a voyage from "Grande Island" to Bordeaux, Gironde.
Statesman	United Kingdom	The ship departed from North Shields, Northumberland for New York, United States. Subsequently reported as missing.
Uchimoff	Russia	The steamship ran aground at "Ingurbournen", in the Dardanelles.
Yuba	United Kingdom	The brig was driven ashore and wrecked at Blakeney, Norfolk. Her crew were rescued. She was on a voyage from Hull, Yorkshire to Charleston, South Carolina, United States.
Zeeploeg	Netherlands	The brig was wrecked on the Goodwin Sands, Kent, United Kingdom. Her seven crew were rescued by the tug Aid (United Kingdom) and the Ramsgate Lifeboat. She was on a voyage from South Shields to Trieste.

== 16 December ==
List of shipwrecks: 16 December 1865
Ship	State	Description
Admiral	United States	The steamboat was sunk by ice in the Mississippi River at St. Louis, Missouri.
Calypso	United States	The 245-ton sidewheel paddle steamer was sunk by ice in the Mississippi River at St. Louis.
China	United Kingdom	The barque was wrecked on the coast of County Wicklow.
Geneva	United States	The 127-ton sternwheel paddle steamer was sunk by ice in the Mississippi River at St. Louis.
Highlander	United States	The 241-ton sternwheel paddle steamer sank after striking ice in the Tennessee River at Johnsonville, Tennessee.
Lizzie Fenwick	United Kingdom	The ship foundered in the Atlantic Ocean. Her crew were rescued by Don (Spain). Lizzie Fenwick was on a voyage from Baltimore, Maryland to Liverpool, Lancashire, United Kingdom.
Metropolitan	United States	The 313-ton sidewheel paddle steamer was sunk by ice in the Mississippi River at St. Louis.
USS New Ironsides	United States Navy	The broadside ironclad was destroyed by fire while laid up at the Philadelphia Navy Yard in Philadelphia, Pennsylvania.
Omaha	United States	The 307-ton sidewheel paddle steamer was sunk by ice in the Mississippi River at St. Louis.
Persian	United Kingdom	The barque ran aground on Scroby Sands, Norfolk. She was on a voyage from South Shields, County Durham to Trieste. She was refloated the next day and assisted in to Lowestoft, Suffolk, where she ran aground.
Reina de las Mares	Spain	The ship was run into by the steamship Alabama (United States) and was cut in two. She was on a voyage from Havana, Cuba to New York, United States.
Rosalie	United States	The 158-ton sternwheel paddle steamer was sunk by ice in the Mississippi River at St. Louis.
Sarah	United Kingdom	The brig was driven ashore at Whitburn, County Durham.
Unnamed	Kingdom of Greece	The ship was wrecked on Kythira.
Unnamed	France	The ship was wrecked on Kythira with the loss of all hands.

== 17 December ==
List of shipwrecks: 17 December 1865
Ship	State	Description
Aurora	United Kingdom	The ship departed from Boston, Lincolnshire for London. No further trace, presumed foundered with the loss of all hands.
Cotopaxi	United Kingdom	The ship ran aground on the Roar Sand, in the English Channel off the coast of Kent. She was on a voyage from Sunderland, County Durham, to Alexandria, Egypt. She was refloated with assistance from the Coast Guard and resumed her voyage.
George Duncan	United Kingdom	The ship was abandoned in the Mediterranean Sea off Sardinia, Italy. Her crew were rescued by HMS Arethusa (Royal Navy). George Duncan was on a voyage from Brăila, Ottoman Empire to Cork.
Marietta	Italy	The brig was wrecked near Bône, Algeria with the loss of three of her nine crew.
Nicolina	United Kingdom	The brig was wrecked near Bône. Her crew were rescued.
Ocean Star	United States	The ship was wrecked on the coast of New Jersey. Her crew were rescued. She was on a voyage from Cape Breton Island, Nova Scotia, British North America to New York.
Resolution	United Kingdom	The barque foundered in the Mediterranean Sea 20 nautical miles (37 km) north west of Galeta Island, Algeria. Her crew were rescued by the brig Unione ( Austrian Empire). Resolution was on a voyage from Trieste to Cork or Falmouth, Cornwall.
Ripple	United Kingdom	The ship ran aground on the Longsand, in the North Sea off the coast of Essex. She was on a voyage from Great Yarmouth, Norfolk to Londonderry. She was refloated and assisted in to Harwich, Essex.
Roanoke	United States	The 266-ton sternwheel paddle steamer was wrecked in the Mississippi River near Commerce, Missouri.
Taxarchis	Greece	The brig collided with the barque Isabella Harnet (United Kingdom) and was abandoned in the Sea of Marmara with the loss of a crew member. She was subsequently taken in to Constantinople, Ottoman Empire.
Vulfraud	France	The ship was wrecked on the coast of Algeria. Her crew were rescued.

== 18 December ==
List of shipwrecks: 18 December 1865
Ship	State	Description
Arethusa	United Kingdom	The ship was driven ashore. She was refloated and towed in to Sheerness, Kent.
Israel R. Snow, or Israel L. Snow	United States	The 95-ton schooner, carrying a cargo of 800 bushels of lime and 100 bushels of potatoes from Rockland, Maine, to Savannah, Georgia, was beached on Tybee Island, Georgia, leaking and with her cargo on fire.
Jubilee	United Kingdom	The ship ran aground at Shanghai, China. She was on a voyage from London to Shanghai.
La Plouzecan	Flag unknown	The ship collided with a steamship and foundered in the Irish Sea off Great Orme Head, Caernarfonshire, United Kingdom. Her crew were rescued. She was on a voyage from Liverpool, Lancashire, United Kingdom to Cádiz, Spain.
Noel	(United Kingdom of Great Britain and Ireland) British North America	The brigantine was wrecked on Tiree, Inner Hebrides. Her seven crew were rescued. She was on a voyage from Saint John's, Newfoundland to the Clyde.
Powerful	Brazil	The steamship was wrecked at Albardão with the loss of 21 lives out of about 500 people on board. She was on a voyage from Rio de Janeiro to the Rio Grande.
Saltram	United Kingdom	The schooner was driven ashore and severely damaged at St. Mawes, Cornwall. She was on a voyage from Neath, Glamorgan to Torquay, Devon.
Theodor	Russia	The barque was wrecked at Pozzallo, Sicily, Italy. Her crew survived. She was on a voyage from Cardiff, Glamorgan, United Kingdom to Alexandria, Egypt.

== 19 December ==
List of shipwrecks: 19 December 1865
Ship	State	Description
Erstatningen	Norway	The schooner was driven ashore and wrecked on the Isle of Harris, Outer Hebrides, United Kingdom. Her crew were rescued.
Galatea	United Kingdom	The schooner collided with the brig Jordan off Flamborough Head, Yorkshire and was abandoned in a sinking condition. Her crew were rescued. She was on a voyage from Dundee, Forfarshire to Goole, Yorkshire.
Minna Larsen	Norway	The brig was driven ashore at "Agnona", Sicily, Italy. Her crew were rescued.
Rob Roy	United Kingdom	The skiff was run into by the tug Prince of Wales (United Kingdom and sank in the Swash, off the coast of Glamorgan.
Sirocco	(United Kingdom of Great Britain and Ireland) British North America	The ship was wrecked at Red Island, Newfoundland.
Unidentified	(United Kingdom of Great Britain and Ireland) British North America	The ship, thought to be either Captain Ross or Captain Stirling, was wrecked at Red Island.

== 20 December ==
List of shipwrecks: 20 December 1865
Ship	State	Description
Aggripina	United Kingdom	The ship caught fire and was abandoned. Her crew were rescued by Cyclone (United Kingdom). Aggripina was on a voyage from New Orleans, Louisiana, United States to Liverpool, Lancashire.
Borysthenes	France	The steamship struck a rock and was wrecked off Cape Blanco, French Algeria with the loss of 53 lives. More than 200 survivors reached Plane Island. She was on a voyage form Marseille, Bouches-du-Rhône to Oran, Algeria.
Christiana	United States	The ship was wrecked in the Atlantic Ocean with the loss of two lives. She was on a voyage from London, United Kingdom to New York.
Lilly	United Kingdom	The schooner was driven ashore near Port William, Wigtownshire. She was on a voyage from Runcorn, Cheshire to Belfast, County Antrim.
R. A. Hevin	United States	The full-rigged ship was driven ashore and wrecked on Ship Island, Mississippi.
Nordtyset	United Kingdom	The brig ran aground at Great Yarmouth, Norfolk, United Kingdom. She was on a voyage from Taganrog, Russia to Great Yarmouth.
Okadona	United States	The ship wrecked off Fayal Island, Azores. Her crew were rescued. She was on a voyage from Liverpool to Baltimore, Maryland.
Philomele	France	The brig was wrecked near Bougie, Algeria. Her crew were rescued.
St. Malo	France	The steamship ran aground on the Crapaud Rock, off Jersey, Channel Islands. She was on a voyage from Jersey to Saint-Malo, Ille-et-Vilaine. She was refloated and resumed her voyage.
Tararua	(United Kingdom of Great Britain and Ireland) New Zealand	The steamship ran aground at Cape Farewell. She was on a voyage from Sydney, New South Wales to Nelson. She was refloated the next day and completed her voyage.
Two Marys	United Kingdom	The brig was wrecked on the Shipwash Sand, in the North Sea off the coast of Suffolk. Her crew were rescued.
Unnamed	Flag unknown	The barque ran aground on Scroby Sands, Norfolk. She was refloated.

== 21 December ==
List of shipwrecks: 21 December 1865
Ship	State	Description
Adele	United Kingdom	The ship ran aground on the Goodwin Sands, Kent. She was on a voyage from Nieuwpoort to Cardiff, Glamorgan. She was refloated with the assistance of a smack and put in to Calais, France in a leaky condition.
Admiral Magon	France	The brig was abandoned at sea. She was on a voyage from Swansea, Glamorgan to Saint-Malo, Ille-et-Vilaine. One crew member was left on board, he was subsequently rescued by Gustav (Flag unknown) along with three cats and a dog.
Charlotte	United Kingdom	The ship was wrecked on Taylor's Bank, in Liverpool Bay. Her crew were rescued. She was on a voyage from Liverpool, Lancashire to Dublin.
Edouard Virginie	France	The ship was driven ashore near Malltraeth, Anglesey, United Kingdom. Her crew survived. She was on a voyage from Nantes, Loire-Inférieure to Liverpool
Ellen Forrest	United States	The schooner was wrecked on Block Island, Rhode Island.
Himalaya	United Kingdom	The ship was abandoned in the Atlantic Ocean. Her crew were rescued by Anna Kimball (United States). Himalaya was on a voyage from Quebec City, Province of Canada, British North America to Silloth, Cumberland.
Jane Lowden	United Kingdom	The ship was wrecked in the Atlantic Ocean. Of her eighteen crew, only her captain survived to be rescued on 18 January 1866 by Ida Elizabeth (Netherlands). Jane Lowden was on a voyage from Quebec City to Falmouth, Cornwall.
Johann II	Flag unknown	The ship was driven ashore at Plymouth, Devon, United Kingdom. She was on a voyage from Le Havre, Seine-Inférieure, France to Cardiff, Glamorgan, United States.
Martha	United Kingdom	The brig was driven ashore near Donaghadee, County Down. She was on a voyage from Prince Edward Island, British North America to Liverpool.
Mary E. Thompson	United States	Carrying a cargo of cotton, hides, and wool, the brig was wrecked on Block Island.

== 22 December ==
List of shipwrecks: 22 December 1865
Ship	State	Description
Auguste	United Kingdom	The ship was driven ashore at Annagassan, County Louth, United Kingdom. She was on a voyage from Nantes, Loire-Inférieure to Newry, County Antrim, United Kingdom.
Coke	United Kingdom	The sloop was driven ashore at Theddlethorpe, Lincolnshire. She was on a voyage from Wells-next-the-Sea, Northumberland to Goole, Yorkshire.
Ellen Maria	United Kingdom	The ship caught fire at Apalachicola, Florida, United States and was scuttled.
Europa	United Kingdom	The brig ran aground and was damaged at Swansea, Glamorgan. She was on a voyage from Alicante, Spain to Swansea. She was refloated on 25 December and taken in to Swansea.
Jew	United Kingdom	The schooner was abandoned in a sinking condition.
Mohawk	United Kingdom	The ship was sighted off the coast of County Kerry in distress. She was on a voyage from Lagos, Portugal to London. Subsequently foundered with the loss of all hands, wreckaged washed ashore on the coast of County Kerry.
New Friendship	United Kingdom	The ship collided with Brune (France) and sank in the English Channel. Her crew were rescued by Brune. New Friendship was on a voyage from Youghal, County Cork to Cherbourg, Seine-Inférieure, France.
Oceana	Norway	The barque ran aground on the Upper Middle Sand. She was on a voyage from New York, United States to Queenstown, County Cork, United Kingdom. She was refloated and put back to New York in a leaky condition.
Ocean Bride	United Kingdom	The tug was run down and sunk off Sunderland, County Durham, by the steamship Reliance (United Kingdom). Her crew were rescued.
São José II	Portugal	The brigantine was wrecked at São Miguel Island, Azores. She was on a voyage from São Miguel Island to Lisbon.
Scotchman	United Kingdom	The schooner departed from Newcastle upon Tyne, Northumberland for Tralee, County Kerry. No further trace, presumed foundered with the loss of all hands.
Three Sisters	United States	The ship caught fire in the Scheldt and was beached near Vlissingen, Zeeland, Netherlands. She was on a voyage from Antwerp, Belgium to New York. She was severely damaged.

== 23 December ==
List of shipwrecks: 23 December 1865
Ship	State	Description
City of Dunedin	United Kingdom	The ship ran aground in the Middle Rangafulla Channel. She was on a voyage from Liverpool, Lancashire to Calcutta, India.
Ernste	Sweden	The ship departed from Helsingborg for Hull, Yorkshire, United Kingdom . No further trace, presumed foundered with the loss of all hands.
Ibis	United Kingdom	The steamship was driven ashore and wrecked in Ballycroneen Bay, County Cork with the loss of nineteen of the 40 people on board. Survivors were rescued by the steamship City of London (United Kingdom). Ibis was on a voyage from London to Cork.
Idaho	United States	The 522-ton screw steamer was stranded at Barnegat, New Jersey.
Tigress	United States	The full-rigged ship was abandoned in the Atlantic Ocean (39°30′N 49°30′W). Her crew were rescued by the full-rigged ship Triton (Denmark). Tigress was on a voyage from Navassa Island to Hull
Tritonia	United Kingdom	The ship ran aground on the Shipwash Sand, in the North Sea off the coast of Suffolk. She was on a voyage from Sunderland, County Durham, to London. She was refloated with the assistance of some smacks and resumed her voyage.
Waverley	United Kingdom	The ship ran aground on the Shipwash sand. She was on a voyage from Sunderland to London. She was refloated with the assistance of some smacks and resumed her voyage.
Wilhelmina	Stralsund	The schooner was driven ashore at Rattray Head, Aberdeenshire, United Kingdom and was abandoned by her crew, who were rescued. The Peterhead Lifeboat People's Journal ( Royal National Lifeboat Institution) rescued one man. Wilhelmina was on a voyage from Riga, Russia to Newry, County Antrim, United Kingdom.

== 24 December ==
List of shipwrecks: 24 December 1865
Ship	State	Description
Armada	(United Kingdom of Great Britain and Ireland) British North America	The schooner was driven ashore and wrecked on Goat Island, Maine, United States. Her crew were rescued. She was on a voyage from Saint John, New Brunswick to Boston, Massachusetts, United States.
Ayrshire	United Kingdom	The ship was wrecked on Muckle Roe, Shetland Islands. She was on a voyage from Lerwick, Shetland Islands to Dundee, Forfarshire.
Echo	United Kingdom	The schooner was wrecked at Bathurst, Gambia Colony and Protectorate.
Edouard	France	The brig was driven ashore 2 nautical miles (3.7 km) north of Bridlington, Yorkshire, United Kingdom. She was refloated and resumed her voyage.
Heinrich	Greifswald	The ship was wrecked on the west coast of Skagen, Denmark with the loss of three of her crew. She was on a voyage from Newcastle upon Tyne, Northumberland, United Kingdom to Swinemünde, Prussia.
John	United Kingdom	The sloop sank at Bristol, Gloucestershire.
Leviathan	(United Kingdom of Great Britain and Ireland) British North America	The schooner was driven ashore at Cutler, Maine, United States. She was on a voyage from Boston, Massachusetts, United States to Saint John, New Brunswick.
Mary Blades	United States	The ship was abandoned in the Atlantic Ocean. All sixteen people on board were rescued by the schooner Koret (United States). Mary Blades was on a voyage from New York to Queenstown, County Cork, United Kingdom.
Newton	Hamburg	The ship was wrecked off Nantucket, Massachusetts, United States with the loss of all hands. She was on a voyage from New York to Hamburg.
Owen Glendower	United Kingdom	The ship foundered in the Indian Ocean 120 nautical miles (220 km) off Mauritius. Her crew survived. She was on a voyage from Bombay, India to a port in Peru.
Vision	(United Kingdom of Great Britain and Ireland) New Zealand	The cutter went ashore on the Whangaparaoa Peninsula and was wrecked.

== 25 December ==
List of shipwrecks: 25 December 1865
Ship	State	Description
Argus	United Kingdom	The barque was driven ashore and damaged at Flamborough Head, Yorkshire. She was on a voyage from Harwich, Essex to South Shields, County Durham. She had become a wreck by 1 January 1866.
Hadgill	United Kingdom	The ship was driven ashore at Flamborough Head. She was on a voyage from London to Newcastle upon Tyne, Northumberland. She was refloated and resumed her voyage.
Isaac and Isabella Blackburn	United Kingdom	The ship was driven ashore at Flamborough Head. She was on a voyage from Hull, Yorkshire to Middlesbrough, Yorkshire. She was refloated and resumed her voyage.
Martina Adriana	Netherlands	The ship ran aground on the Haaks Bank, in the North Sea off the coast of the Netherlands. She was on a voyage from Surinam to Amsterdam, North Holland.
Newton	United States	The 699-ton full-rigged ship was lost off Nantucket Island, Massachusetts.
St. Lawrence	United Kingdom	The ship was driven ashore near "Carngaholt", County Kerry. She was on a voyage from Cardiff, Glamorgan to Alicante, Spain.

== 26 December ==
List of shipwrecks: 26 December 1865
Ship	State	Description
Aggrippina	United Kingdom	The ship caught fire in the Atlantic Ocean and was abandoned, Her crew were rescued by Cyclone (United States). Aggrippina was on a voyage from New Orleans, Louisiana, United States to Liverpool, Lancashire.
Elizabeth	United Kingdom	The full-rigged ship was abandoned in the Atlantic Ocean off the coast of County Donegal with the loss of four of her 27. She came ashore on "Island Crone" on 27 December.
Frithiof	Norway	The brig was abandoned at sea. Her crew were rescued by the steamship Nova Scotian (United Kingdom). Frithiof was on a voyage from Philadelphia, Pennsylvania, United States to Liverpool.
Lexington	United Kingdom	The ship foundered off Islay, Inner Hebrides with the loss of a crew member. She was on a voyage from Liverpool to Havana, Cuba.
Ljderhorn	Norway	The barque foundered in the Black Sea. Her crew were rescued. She was on a voyage from Sulina, Ottoman Empire to an English port.
Margaret Potter	United Kingdom	The schooner was lost in the Irish Sea with the loss of one of her three crew. Survivors were rescued by the steamship Faleon (United Kingdom).
Martina Adriana	Netherlands	The full-rigged ship sank off Hook of Holland, South Holland. She was on a voyage from Surinam to Amsterdam, North Holland.
Micmac	United Kingdom	The ship was wrecked at Balranald, in the Monach Islands, Outer Hebrides. Her crew survived. She was on a voyage from Montreal, Province of Canada, British North America to Glasgow, Renfrewshire.
Old Colony	United States	The ship was driven ashore near Fort Lafayette, New York. She was on a voyage from London, United Kingdom to New York. She was refloated and completed her voyage.
Paramount	United Kingdom	The ship was abandoned off Colonsay, Inner Hebrides. She was on a voyage from Galveston, Texas, United States to Liverpool. She came ashore on Islay on 11 January 1866.
Tenasserim	United Kingdom	The ship was wrecked on the Arklow Bank, in the Irish Sea off the coast of County Wicklow with the loss of two of her 36 crew. Survivors were rescued by the Arklow Lifeboat Arundel Venables ( Royal National Lifeboat Institution). Tenasserim was on a voyage from Liverpool Lancashire to Calcutta, India.
William Carey	United Kingdom	The brig was abandoned in the Atlantic Ocean. Her crew were rescued by Orpheus (United Kingdom). William Carey was on a voyage from New York to Liverpool.

== 27 December ==
List of shipwrecks: 27 December 1865
Ship	State	Description
Bosphorus	United States	The steamship was driven ashore near Fort Lafayette, New York. She was refloated.
Delia	United Kingdom	The barque was abandoned off Colonsay, Inner Hebrides. Her crew were rescued. She was on a voyage from Quebec City, Province of Canada, British North America to Plymouth, Devon.
Linda	(United Kingdom of Great Britain and Ireland) British North America	The ship was driven ashore and wrecked in Llawras Bay, Ireland. Her crew were rescued. She was on a voyage from Charlottetown, Prince Edward Island to Liverpool, Lancashire.
St. Lawrence	United Kingdom	The barque was driven ashore and wrecked in Carrickaholt Bay, County Limerick.

== 28 December ==
List of shipwrecks: 28 December 1865
Ship	State	Description
Commonwealth	United States	The steamship was destroyed by fire at Groton, Connecticut.
Ida May	United States	The 220-ton sidewheel paddle steamer was wrecked on the Red River of the South 100 nautical miles (190 km) downstream of Shreveport, Louisiana.
Neptune	United States	The brig was driven ashore and wrecked between Cambois and Newbiggin-by-the-Sea, Northumberland, United Kingdom. She was on a voyage from New York to Grangemouth, Stirlingshire, United Kingdom.
Prosper	United States	The ship was driven ashore at Sandy Hook, New Jersey. SHe was on a voyage from Martinique to New York.
Severn	United Kingdom	The full-rigged ship was abandoned in the Atlantic Ocean. Her crew were rescued by the brigantine R. B. Gove (United Kingdom). Severn was on her maiden voyage. from Calcutta, India to London.
Sligo	United Kingdom	The steamship struck a sunken rock and was beached at The Rosses, County Donegal. She was on a voyage from Westport, County Mayo to Liverpool, Lancashire.
Stafford	United Kingdom	The ship was driven ashore at Bacton, Norfolk. She was on a voyage from Sunderland, County Durham, to Bombay, India. She was refloated.
Tom Cringle	United Kingdom	The schooner was driven ashore on the Bondicar Rocks, Northumberland. Her crew were rescued. She was on a voyage from Seaham, County Durham to Aberdeen.
Unnamed	United Kingdom	The ship foundered in the Atlantic Ocean. The clipper Carrier Dove (United States) was unable to give assistance. All hands presumed lost.

== 29 December ==
List of shipwrecks: 29 December 1865
Ship	State	Description
Annabel	United Kingdom	The brig ran ashore and was wrecked at Montrose, Forfarshire. Her crew survived. She was on a voyage from Montrose to Sunderland, County Durham.
Auguste Maria	France	The ship was driven ashore on the Bee Sands, Devon, United Kingdom. She was on a voyage from Saint-Malo, Ille-et-Vilaine to Plymouth, Devon. She was refloated on 31 December and taken in to Dartmouth, Devon.
Cleverage	United Kingdom	The ship was driven ashore and wrecked at Troon, Ayrshire. She was on a voyage from Liverpool, Lancashire to Pernambuco, Brazil.
Commonwealth	United States	The 1,732-ton sidewheel paddle steamer burned at Groton, Connecticut, with the loss of one life.
Eldorado	United Kingdom	The ship departed from Liverpool for Buenos Aires, Argentina. No further trace, presumed foundered with the loss of all hands.
Harrisons	United Kingdom	The brig was driven on to the Fish Sands, in the North Sea off the coast of County Durham. She was on a voyage from Dieppe, Seine-Inférieure, France to Hartlepool, County Durham. She was refloated on 1 January 1866 and taken in to Hartlepool.
Juliet	United Kingdom	The barque, carrying sugar and 400 casks of rum from Demerara, British Guiana, to London, was making for Padstow Harbour in Cornwall, England, and drifted ashore. Her seventeen crew were saved by the Padstow Lifeboat) Albert Edward ( Royal National Lifeboat Institution), and 280 casks of rum were salvaged later.
Kezia	United Kingdom	The brig was driven ashore and severely damaged at Burntisland, Fife. She was on a voyage from London to Burntisland.
Lady Louisa	United Kingdom	The ship was abandoned off the mouth of the River Shannon. Her crew were rescued by the steamship Holyrood (United Kingdom). Lady Louisa was on a voyage from Cardiff, Glamorgan to Montevideo, Uruguay. She was towed in to the River Shannon by Holyrood.
Lelia, or Lydia	Italy	The barque was driven ashore and wrecked at Roberts CoveRoberts Cove, County Cork, United Kingdom on 29 December. Her crew were rescued by the Coastguard. She was on a voyage from Ottoman Syria to Liverpool.
Leves	United Kingdom	The brig was driven ashore at Tynemouth, Northumberland. Her crew were rescued by the South Shields Lifeboat Constance ( Royal National Lifeboat Institution). Leves was on a voyage from Great Yarmouth, Norfolk to the River Tyne. She was refloated and towed in to South Shields, County Durham in a severely damaged condition.
Princess	United Kingdom	The barque ran aground at Dover, Kent.
St. George	United Kingdom	The ship was driven ashore and wrecked on Colonsay, Inner Hebrides. Her crew were rescued. She was on a voyage from Quebec City, Province of Canada, British North America to the Bristol Channel
Union	United Kingdom	The barque was driven ashore and wrecked at Tynemouth. Her crew were rescued by the North Shields Lifeboat William Wake ( Royal National Lifeboat Institution). Union was on a voyage from Shoreham-by-Sea, Sussex to the River Tyne. She was refloated on 16 January 1866 and taken in to South Shields.
Viceroy	United Kingdom	The barque was driven ashore and wrecked at Port Ellen, Islay. Her crew survived. She was on a voyage from Quebec City, Province of Canada, British North America to Swansea, Glamorgan.
Wynyard	United Kingdom	The brig was driven ashore at Tynemouth. Her crew were rescued by the South Shields Lifeboat Constance ( Royal National Lifeboat Institution). Wynyard was on a voyage from Blyth, Northumberland to the River Tyne. She was refloated and taken in to South Shields.
Zezia	United Kingdom	The ship was driven ashore at Burntisland, Fife. She was on a voyage from London to Burntisland. She had broken up by 2 January 1866.

== 30 December ==
List of shipwrecks: 30 December 1865
Ship	State	Description
Blair	United Kingdom	The schooner was driven ashore at Lamlash, Isle of Arran. She was on a voyage from Belfast, County Antrim to Ardrossan, Ayrshire or vice versa. She was refloated on 19 January 1866.
Diana	United Kingdom	The barque was driven ashore and wrecked on Holy Isle, in the Firth of Clyde. Her crew were rescued She was on a voyage from Liverpool, Lancashire to Pernambuco, Brazil.
Echo	France	The brig was driven ashore on Tiree, Inner Hebrides, United Kingdom. Her crew were rescued. She was on a voyage from Prince Edward Island, British North America to Glasgow, Renfrewshire and/or Bristol, Gloucestershire, United Kingdom.
Elizabeth	United Kingdom	The brig was driven ashore and wrecked at Golden Head, in Galway Bay. She was on a voyage from "Louando" to Falmouth, Cornwall.
Eugenie	United Kingdom	The ship was wrecked in Ballycroneen Bay, County Cork with the loss of thirteen of her 25 crew. She was on a voyage from Liverpool to Saint John, New Brunswick, British North America.
Guy Mannering	United Kingdom	The full-rigged ship was abandoned off the Mull of Kintyre, Argyllshire. Her crew were rescued by J. P. Wheeler (United States). Guy Mannering subsequently foundered.
Huntress	United States	The 138-ton sternwheel paddle steamer struck a snag and sank on the Red River of the South near Alexandria, Louisiana.
Kate	United Kingdom	The schooner was abandoned in the North Sea 30 nautical miles (56 km) east south east of Flamborough Head, Yorkshire. Her crew were rescued by the fishing smack Guide (United Kingdom). Kate was on a voyage from Herne Bay, Kent to Seaham, County Durham.
Lady Louisa Stewart	United Kingdom	The ship was driven against the breakwater at Nairn and was severely damaged. She was on a voyage from Nairn to the River Tyne. She was consequently beached in Cromarty Bay in a waterlogged condition. Lady Louisa Stewart was taken in to Inverness for repairs.
Margarethe	Bremen	The ship was driven ashore at Baltimore, County Cork, United Kingdom. She was on a voyage from Savanilla, United States of Colombia to Bremen.
Norma	Bremen	The barque ran aground on the Goodwin Sands, Kent, United Kingdom and was abandoned by her crew, who were rescued by the Ramsgate Lifeboat. Norma was on a voyage from Richmond, Virginia to London, United Kingdom. She broke up on 1 January 1866.
Palmer	Netherlands	The brig was wrecked on Eileach an Naoimh, Argyllshire, United Kingdom with the loss of two of the nine people on board. She was on a voyage from Jamaica to Liverpool.
Princess of Wales	United Kingdom	The brigantine was driven ashore and wrecked at Sandgate, Kent. Her crew were rescued by the Coastguard. She was on a voyage from London to Demerara, British Guiana.
Rance	France	The brig was driven ashore and wrecked at Swansea, Glamorgan, United Kingdom. She was on a voyage from Saint-Malo, Ille-et-Vilaine to Cardiff, Glamorgan.
Richmond	United Kingdom	The brig ran aground at Swansea.
Sarah Emma	United Kingdom	The brigantine was driven ashore and wrecked at Minard, County Kerry. Her six crew were rescued by the Coastguard She was on her maiden voyage, from Miramichi, New Brunswick to Queenstown, County Cork.
Union	United States	The 116-ton sidewheel paddle steamer burned at Detroit, Michigan.

== 31 December ==
List of shipwrecks: 31 December 1865
Ship	State	Description
Albion	United Kingdom	The schooner sank off Lowestoft, Suffolk. Her crew were rescued. She was on a voyage from South Shields, County Durham to London. Albion came ashore at Lowestoft the next day.
Angler	United Kingdom	The schooner was abandoned in the Atlantic Ocean with the loss of a crew member. She was on a voyage from Newfoundland, British North America to Liverpool, Lancashire.
Beeswing	United Kingdom	The schooner was wrecked on the Newcombe Sand, in the North Sea off the coast of Suffolk with the loss of all hands. She was on a voyage from Rouen, Seine-Inférieure, France to Whitby, Yorkshire.
Bermuda	United Kingdom	The ship was abandoned in the Atlantic Ocean. Her crew survived. She was on her maiden voyage from Greenock, Renfrewshire to Trinidad. She came ashore on Barra on 7 January 1866 and was wrecked.
Ellen	United Kingdom	The ship was driven ashore in St Aubin's Bay, Jersey, Channel Islands. She was refloated on 1 January 1866 and taken in to Saint Helier, Jersey.
Germania	United States	The ship was wrecked on Iona, Inner Hebrides, United Kingdom with the loss of fourteen of the 46 people on board. She was on a voyage from New York to Liverpool.
Goldena	United States	The sternwheel paddle steamer was stranded at the White River Cutoff between the Arkansas River and the White River in Arkansas and was abandoned.
Hydra	United Kingdom	The smack was driven ashore at Hull, Yorkshire. She floated off and sank in the Humber. Her crew were rescued.
Isabella	United Kingdom	The ship was driven ashore and wrecked near Westhaven, Forfarshire with the loss of three of her crew. She was on a voyage from Seaham, County Durham to Dundee, Forfarshire.
J. P. Wheeler	United States	The ship was wrecked near Oban, Argyllshire, United Kingdom. She was on a voyage from New York to Glasgow, Renfrewshire, United Kingdom. She was later refloated and taken in to Oban in a leaky condition.
Keoka	United Kingdom	The schooner was driven ashore south of St. Bees Head, Cumberland. She was on a voyage from Dublin to Whitehaven, Cumberland.
Laura	United Kingdom	The ship was driven ashore near Stranraer, Wigtownshire. Her crew were rescued. She was on a voyage from Dublin to Ayr.
Leander	United Kingdom	The barque was driven ashore and damaged 10 nautical miles (19 km) from Crookhaven, County Cork. She was on a voyage from New York, United States to Liverpool. She was refloated on 3 January.
Mary	United Kingdom	The brig was driven ashore and wrecked in the Bay of Luce. She was on a voyage from Drogheda, County Louth to Workington, Cumberland.
Oscar	United Kingdom	The ship ran aground at St. Catherine's Point, Isle of Wight. She was refloated and taken in to Portsmouth, Hampshire.
Seahorse	United Kingdom	The brig was wrecked at Scarlet Point, near Castletown, Isle of Man with the loss of a crew member. She was on a voyage from Whitehaven, Cumberland to Dublin.
Shamrock	United Kingdom	The ship sank at Peterhead, Aberdeenshire. Her crew survived. She was on a voyage from Sunderland, County Durham, to Peterhead.
Surinam	United Kingdom	The brig was driven ashore at Kirk Michael, Isle of Man.
Union	United Kingdom	The ship was driven ashore at Aberdour, Fife and was abandoned by her crew. She was on a voyage from Aberdeen to Grangemouth, Stirlingshire.
William and John	United Kingdom	The schooner was driven ashore and severely damaged at Lindisfarne, Northumberland. She was on a voyage from Leith, Lothian to the Barking Creek. She was refloated and taken in to Lindisfarne for repairs.

== Unknown date ==
List of shipwrecks: unknown date in December 1865
Ship	State	Description
Actea	United Kingdom	The ship was driven ashore at Port Natal, Cape Colony.
Adamant	United Kingdom	The schooner was wrecked at Little River. She was on a voyage from Boston, Massachusetts, United States to Saint John, New Brunswick, British North America.
Alcyone	United Kingdom	The ship was wrecked on "Bondy Island", near the mouth of the Cape Fear River, before 5 December. She was on a voyage from Liverpool, Lancashire to Baltimore, Maryland, United States.
Ana Catarina	Argentina	The brig ran aground in the Strait of Magellan. She was refloated with assistance from the transport ship Talisman (French Navy).
Argus	United Kingdom	The ship ran aground at Ramsgate, Kent. She was on a voyage from Rotterdam, South Holland, Netherlands to Manzanilla, Trinidad.
Beatriz	Spain	The steamship collided with another vessel and sank at San Sebastián.
Benjamin Adams	United States	The ship was wrecked in the Abaco Islands with the loss of seventeen of the 31 people on board.
Berlin	United Kingdom	The schooner was driven ashore on Lovells Island, Massachusetts, United States and was abandoned by her crew.
British Lion	United Kingdom	The ship ran aground on the Pluckington Bank, in Liverpool Bay. She was on a voyage from Quebec City, Province of Canada, British North America to Liverpool.
Carioca	France	The vessel struck the rocks under Hermitage Rock Battery on Alderney, Channel Islands in late December. Gunner James Moore of the Royal Artillery on Alderney rescued seventeen of her crew; he was later awarded a Royal National Lifeboat Institution Silver Medal.
Castor	United Kingdom	The ship was abandoned off "Arencompalee". India. Her crew were rescued.
Chili	France	The ship ran aground at San Antonio, Chile. She was on a voyage from Cardiff, Glamorgan, United Kingdom to San Antonio. She was refloated and ordered to Valparaíso for repairs.
Compeer	United Kingdom	The full-rigged ship was driven ashore on Sandy Island, Georgia, United States. She was on a voyage from Liverpool to Mobile, Alabama, United States.
Daisy	United Kingdom	The ship was wrecked in the Balbec Strait. She was on a voyage from Saigon, French Cochinchina to Surabaya, Netherlands East Indies.
Darling	United States	The sidewheel paddle steamer sank in the Mississippi River at Plum Point, Tennessee. She later was refloated.
Dieu Protège Alexandre et Leiu	France	The fishing boat was wrecked at Dungeness, Kent. Her seven crew were rescued by the Dungeness Lifeboat Providence ( Royal National Lifeboat Institution).
Douglas	United Kingdom	The schooner was driven ashore in Cluny Bay. She was on a voyage from "Pennant" to the Clyde.
Elizabeth Beck	United Kingdom	The schooner was driven ashore at Wells-next-the-Sea, Norfolk. She was on a voyage from Newcastle upon Tyne, Northumberland to Penzance, Cornwall. She was refloated and resumed her voyage.
Elizabeth Ryan	United Kingdom	The schooner was wrecked at Lower Prospect, Nova Scotia, British North America before 28 December. She was on a voyage from Boston, Massachusetts, United States to Halifax, Nova Scotia.
Energy	United States	The ship was driven ashore on Sicily, Italy. She was on a voyage from Trieste to New York, United States.
Esterias	United Kingdom	The barque was wrecked at Port Arthur, Cape Colony.
Ethelrida	United Kingdom	The barque was wrecked at Port Arthur.
Glasgow	United Kingdom	The ship was driven ashore near Cape Henry, Virginia, United States before 5 December.
Guadaloupe	Spain	The ship was wrecked on Brava Island, Cape Verde Islands before 21 December with the loss of more than 600 lives. She was on a voyage from A Coruña to Montevideo, Uruguay. Also reported as losing 60 of 180 passengers.
Harriet	United Kingdom	The ship was wrecked near Key West, Florida United States. She was on a voyage from New Orleans, Louisiana to Liverpool.
Harriet Wild	(United Kingdom of Great Britain and Ireland) Isle of Man	The schooner was blown out to sea from Ramsey. She was subsequently wrecked on the Scottish coast with the loss of all hands.
Industry	United Kingdom	The schooner was run ashore near Ramsey. Her crew survived.
Jane	United Kingdom	The schooner was driven ashore at Larne, County Antrim. She was refloated on 23 December.
Jeanne	United Kingdom	The ship was driven ashore near Maryport, Cumberland. She was on a voyage from Buenos Aires, Argentina to Silloth, Cumberland.
Lilian	United Kingdom	The ship was wrecked at Maranhão, Brazil.
Lyderhorn	Norway	The barque was abandoned at the entrance to the Bosphorus. She was on a voyage from Sulina, Ottoman Empire to an English port. She came ashore at Büyükdere, Ottoman Empire and was wrecked. She had been refloated by 4 January 1866.
Kadie	(United Kingdom of Great Britain and Ireland) Cape Colony	The coaster was wrecked at Port Arthur.
Marance	United Kingdom	The ship was destroyed by fire. Her crew were rescued by the steamship Malta (United Kingdom). Marance was on a voyage from Bombay, India to Aden.
Mariner	United Kingdom	The schooner was abandoned at sea. Her crew were rescued by Rosina (United Kingdom).
Melody	United Kingdom	The ship was wrecked at Minatitlán, Mexico.
Nouveau Pacifique	France	The ship was driven ashore at "Eoine". She was refloated on 17 December and taken in to Saint-Nazaire, Loire-Inférieure.
Nestor	Greifswald	The ship was driven ashore between Falsterbo and Trelleborg, Sweden. She was on a voyage from Danzig to Bristol, Gloucestershire, United Kingdom. She was later refloated and taken in to Helsingør, Denmark for repairs.
Ornen	Denmark	The schooner collided with the steamship Ambères (France on or before 13 December and was abandoned. Her crew were rescued by Ambères. Ornen was towed in to Penzance in a waterlogged condition on 16 December.
Polly	United Kingdom	The ship was destroyed by fire off the coast of Ceylon.
Princess Royal	United Kingdom	The barque foundered off Ceylon before 11 December. Her crew were rescued. She was on a voyage from Madras, India to Amherst, Burma.
Prosper	France	The brig was driven ashore near Sandy Hook, New Jersey, United States. She was on a voyage from Bordeaux, Gironde to New York.
Qua Lee	China	The ship was driven ashore and wrecked on the coast of Shandong.
Regoleto	Mexico	The schooner was abandoned off the East Triangle Key. Her crew were rescued by the steamship Manhattan (United States).
Rodolph	United States	The 249-ton sternwheel paddle steamer struck a snag and sank in the Arkansas River 15 nautical miles (28 km) downstream of Little Rock, Arkansas.
Roger A. Heirn	United States	The full-rigged ship was wrecked on Sand Island, off Mobile, Alabama. She was on a voyage from Mobile to Liverpool.
Ruby	United States	The 78-ton sidewheel ferry foundered in the Mississippi River.
Ruterpe	United Kingdom	The ship was severely damaged in a gale at Madras before 8 December.
Simla	United Kingdom	The East Indiaman caught fire and was abandoned at sea before 16 December. Her crew were rescued by Star of India (United Kingdom). Simla was on a voyage from Bombay to Liverpool.
Susan	United Kingdom	The schooner was wrecked at Holywell, Cornwall with the loss of three of her four crew. She was on a voyage from Gloucester to St. Ives, Cornwall.
Victor	Courland Governorate	The brig was found by the steamship Jutland (United Kingdom), abandoned and making water in the North Sea, 200 nautical miles (370 km) from Spurn Point. The crew were taken onboard from the ship's boats and she was towed in to Hull, Yorkshire, United Kingdom on 7 December. Victor was on a voyage from Libau to London. Victor resumed her voyage on 25 December.
William Edward	United States	The ship sank off Barnegat, New Jersey, United States. She was on a voyage from Le Havre, Seine-Inférieure, France to New York.
