= Nettuno (disambiguation) =

Nettuno is a town near Rome in Italy.

Nettuno (Italian, 'Neptune') may also refer to:

- French brig Nettuno (1807)
- Nettuno, formerly Empire Mary, an Empire ship
- Nettuno DOC, a wine region in Lazio, Italy
- Maserati Nettuno engine

== See also ==
- Neptune (disambiguation)
- Treaty of Nettuno
- Nettuno BC 1945, an Italian baseball club
