= Neptuno (ship) =

Neptuno may refer to a number of ships named for Neptune, the god of freshwater and the sea in Roman mythology.

- Spanish ship Neptuno, a number of ships of the Spanish Navy
- NRP Neptuno (S162) (1944), a Portuguese submarine, formerly HMS Spearhead
- Neptuno (2015), a semi-submersible accommodation vessel

== See also ==
- Neptun (ship)
- Neptune (ship)
