= USS Neptune =

USS Neptune has been the name of more than one United States Navy ship, and may refer to:

- USS Clyde (1863), a 294-ton side-wheel steam gunboat, was briefly named Neptune when first commissioned
- USS Neptune (1863), a 1,244-ton screw steamship, served during the American Civil War
- USS Manhattan (1863), a monitor in commission from 1864 to 1877, briefly named USS Neptune during 1869
- USS Neptune (AC-8), was a collier that carried the first United States troops to Europe in World War I
- USNS Neptune, was a Neptune-class cable repair ship, acquired by the US Navy in 1953 as USS Neptune (ARC-2) and scrapped in 2005

== In fiction ==
- A fictitious U.S. Navy nuclear submarine named USS Neptune was the setting of the 1978 movie Gray Lady Down
