= HSwMS Neptun =

Several ships of the Swedish Navy have been named HSwMS Neptun, after the Roman god of freshwater and the sea:

- HSwMS Neptun (1942), a Neptun-class submarine launched in 1942 and decommissioned in 1966.
- HSwMS Neptun (1979), a Näcken-class submarine launched in 1978 and decommissioned in 1998. Now a museum ship.

== See also ==
- HMS Neptune
