= King Neptune =

King Neptune may refer to:

- Neptune (mythology), the Roman god of the sea, referred to as "King" by some
- King Neptune (pig), a pig that was used to raise $19 million in war bonds during World War II
- King Neptune, an officiator in a naval line-crossing ceremony
- King Neptune (SpongeBob SquarePants), a recurring character in SpongeBob SquarePants
- King Neptune (album), a 1979 album by Dexter Gordon
- King Neptune (film), a 1932 animated short film in the Silly Symphonies series
- King Neptune (statue), a large bronze statue in Virginia Beach
- King Neptune, a large limestone sculpture at Two Rocks, Australia
- King Neptune's Adventure, an adventure video game for the Nintendo Entertainment System

== See also ==
- Neptune (disambiguation)
