= Roberts Cove, County Cork =

Seaside village in County Cork, Ireland

Roberts Cove Cuainín Riobaird
- Village
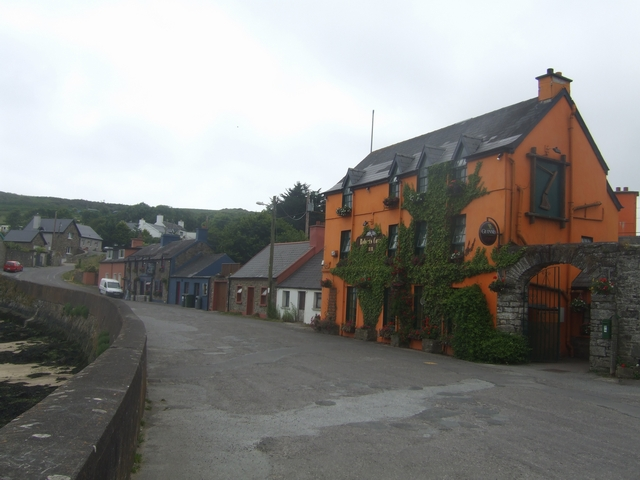
- Inn and village of Roberts Cove

- Location in Ireland
- Coordinates: 51°44′40″N 08°18′47″W
- Country: Ireland
- Province: Munster
- County: County Cork
- Time zone: UTC+0 (WET)
  - Summer (DST): UTC-1 (IST (WEST))

Roberts Cove (Irish: Cuainín Riobaird) is a small village in County Cork, Ireland. The village consists of a number of houses, Roberts Cove Holiday Park and two pubs, The Harbour Bar and Roberts Cove Inn. On summer days, the beach in the village is popular with day-trippers from nearby Cork City. Since 2018 there has been a dive centre based near Roberts Cove called 'Oceans of Discovery'. A majority of the land adjacent to the cove is private property where entry is prohibited.

The village is situated 5 km from Minane Bridge, 12 km from Carrigaline and 25 km from Cork.
