= Operation Neptune (disambiguation) =

Operation Neptune was the code name for the naval phase of the Allied Invasion of Normandy during World War II.

Operation Neptune may also refer to:

- Operation Neptune (espionage), a disinformation campaign by communist Czechoslovakia in 1964
- Operation Neptune (Afghanistan) (2005)
- Operation Neptune (New Zealand), a commemoration of the 75th anniversary of the New Zealand Navy
- Operation Neptune (video game), a computer game

== See also ==
- Operation Neptune Spear, the killing of Osama Bin Laden
