= Project Neptuno =

Water infrastructure project in Arazatí, Uruguay

Proyecto Neptuno, sometimes also called Proyecto Arazatí, is a water infrastructure development project in Arazatí, in the department of San José in Uruguay. A consortium of businesses named "Aguas de Montevideo" presented the project in 2020 to create a water treatment plant that draws water from the Río de la Plata near Azaratí, to satisfy the water needs of the Montevideo metropolitan area.

The government water corporation, OSE, accepted the proposal, issuing a request for proposals to build the plant in November 2022 with an estimated cost of over 200 million dollars, and quickly was approved with the consortium of businesses. A 20-year cost estimate suggests that the Uruguayan government will have to pay at least 480 million dollars to maintain operations of the project.

The project is supposed to provide at least 30% of the metropolitan areas water demand from the Río de La Plata. The process involves building a pólder and artificial lake with 4.0 cubic hectometers capacity. The project has been an important source of environmental conflict. Critics highlight three major issues with the project. First the environmental impact of the project was never fully evaluated. The scientific community in the country, has actively disagreed with OSE's initial evaluation of the impact of the project and its potential to address the water shortages And lastly, critics point to the speed and terms of the contract between the consortium of businesses and the state corporation.
