= Neptuno (2015 ship) =

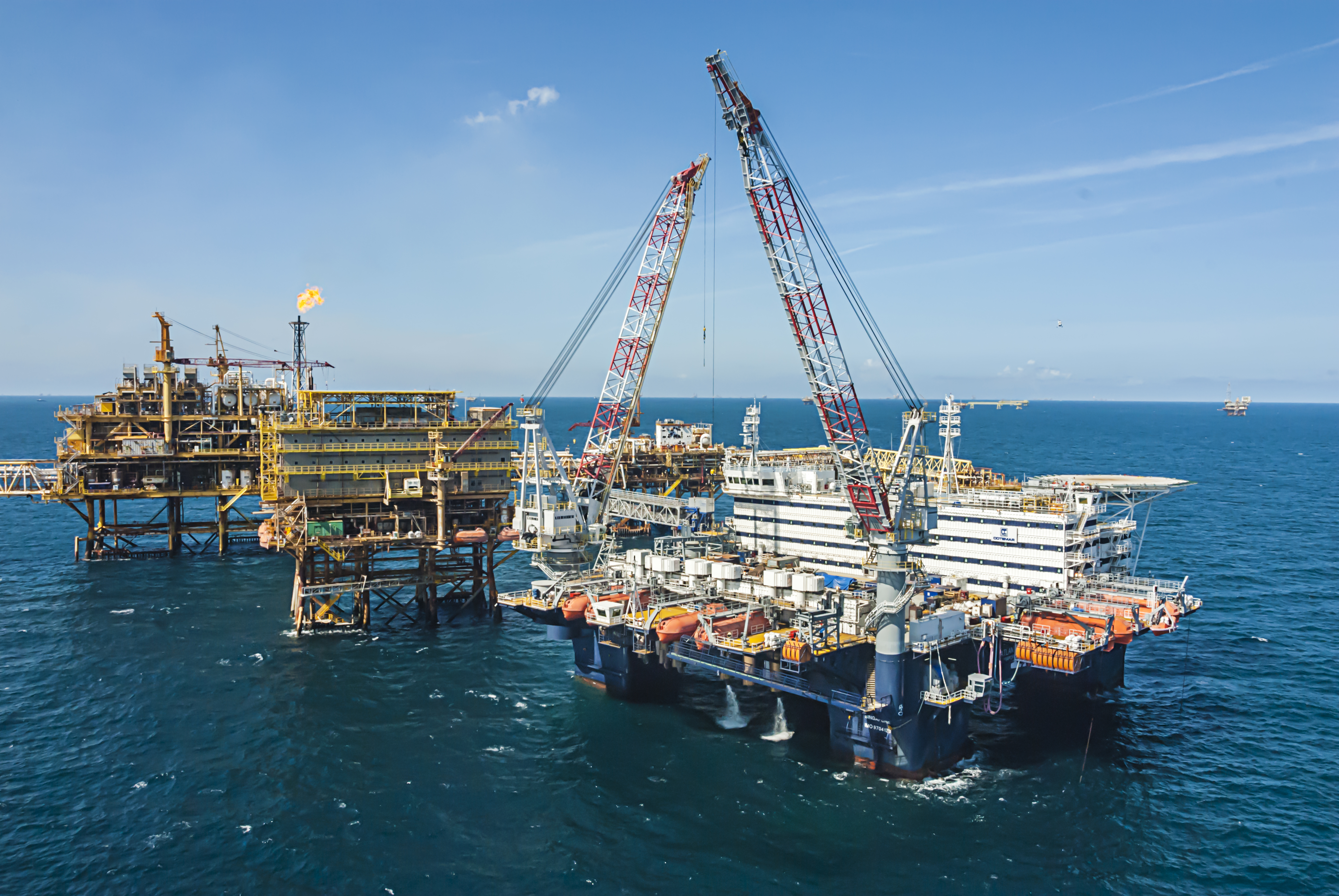
- Sister ship Atlantis in the Gulf of Mexico

History
- Name: Neptuno
- Owner: Neptuno Offshore PTE LTD.
- Operator: Cotemar S.A de C.V
- Port of registry: Singapore
- Builder: COSCO (Nantong) Shipyard Co., Ltd.; Jiangsu Sheng, Nantong Shi, China
- Laid down: March 2013
- Completed: 5 January 2015
- Maiden voyage: 10 January 2015
- In service: 17 April 2015
- Identification: Call sign: 9V2390; DNV ID: 32652; IMO number: 9662136; MMSI number: 565693000
- Status: Operational

General characteristics
- Class & type: DNV: 1A1 Column stabilized accommodation unit; DYNPOS-AUTRO, EO, CRANE, HELDK, Fire Fighter II, BIS.
- Tonnage: 28,808 GT; 8,643 NT
- Length: 91.2 m (299 ft 3 in)
- Beam: 67 m (219 ft 10 in)
- Draught: 67 m (219 ft 10 in)
- Installed power: Main engines 6 × 4,800 kW (6,400 hp) at 720 rpm; Emergency generator 1 × 1,500 kW (2,000 hp)
- Propulsion: Azimuth thrusters 6 x 3,700 kW (5,000 hp)
- Speed: 8 kn (15 km/h; 9.2 mph)
- Crew: 51

Neptuno is a semi-submersible accommodation vessel. Built in China in 2015, the vessel is registered in Singapore.

== Particulars ==
The vessel design is an OCEAN 500 by SBM Offshore subsidiary GustoMSC. It is a dynamically-positioned (DP3) accommodation and construction support semi-submersible for harsh environments. The Neptuno was delivered in January 2015, built by COSCO (Nantong) Shipyard CO. Ltd. Since April 2015 the Neptuno has been working in the Cantarell Field, Mexico as an offshore construction and maintenance service vessel operated by COTEMAR S.A de C.V.

The Neptuno accommodates up to 750 people, featuring 36 single-bed cabins, 29 double-bed cabins, and 164 four-bed cabins. Each cabin includes a private bathroom, natural light, and IT/TV amenities. The vessel is equipped with galley and mess rooms capable of seating 300 people at once. Recreation options onboard include a cinema, recreation rooms, game rooms, and a gym. For medical needs, there is a hospital conveniently located near the helideck, and an elevator provides access to all decks. Additionally, the Neptuno offers several office spaces.

The Neptuno is provided with a Class 3 dynamic positioning system. The DP system has six reference systems with different working principles. It also has two heavy-lift offshore cranes, 1 Liebherr 300-ton crane type BOS 14000-300 and 1 Liebherr 75-tons crane type BOS 4200–75. The vessel has a 2,000-square-metre (22,000 sq ft) main deck and a large workshop. Neptuno is prepared for remotely operated vehicle operations and has a designated area for surface diving. The vessel is equipped to support Sikorsky S92 and S61N helicopters operations, all in compliance with class and regulations established for helicopters. A helicopter re-fueling system is situated close to the helideck area. The vessel has a telescopic gangway for personnel transit with an operational longitude of 38.5 m (126 ft). Neptuno also has a boarding gangway for boat-to-platform personnel transferring with an operational length of 24.3 m (80 ft).

== History ==
The Neptuno was built by COSCO (Nantong) Shipyard CO, the keel was laid in 2013 and delivered to Neptuno Offshore PTE LTD on 5 January 2015. Five days later the Neptuno left China heading to Campeche Bay, Mexico. On 17 April 2015 the Neptuno started operations serving PEMEX, connecting the gangway at Akal-J complex.
