= Nettuno DOC =

Italian wine region

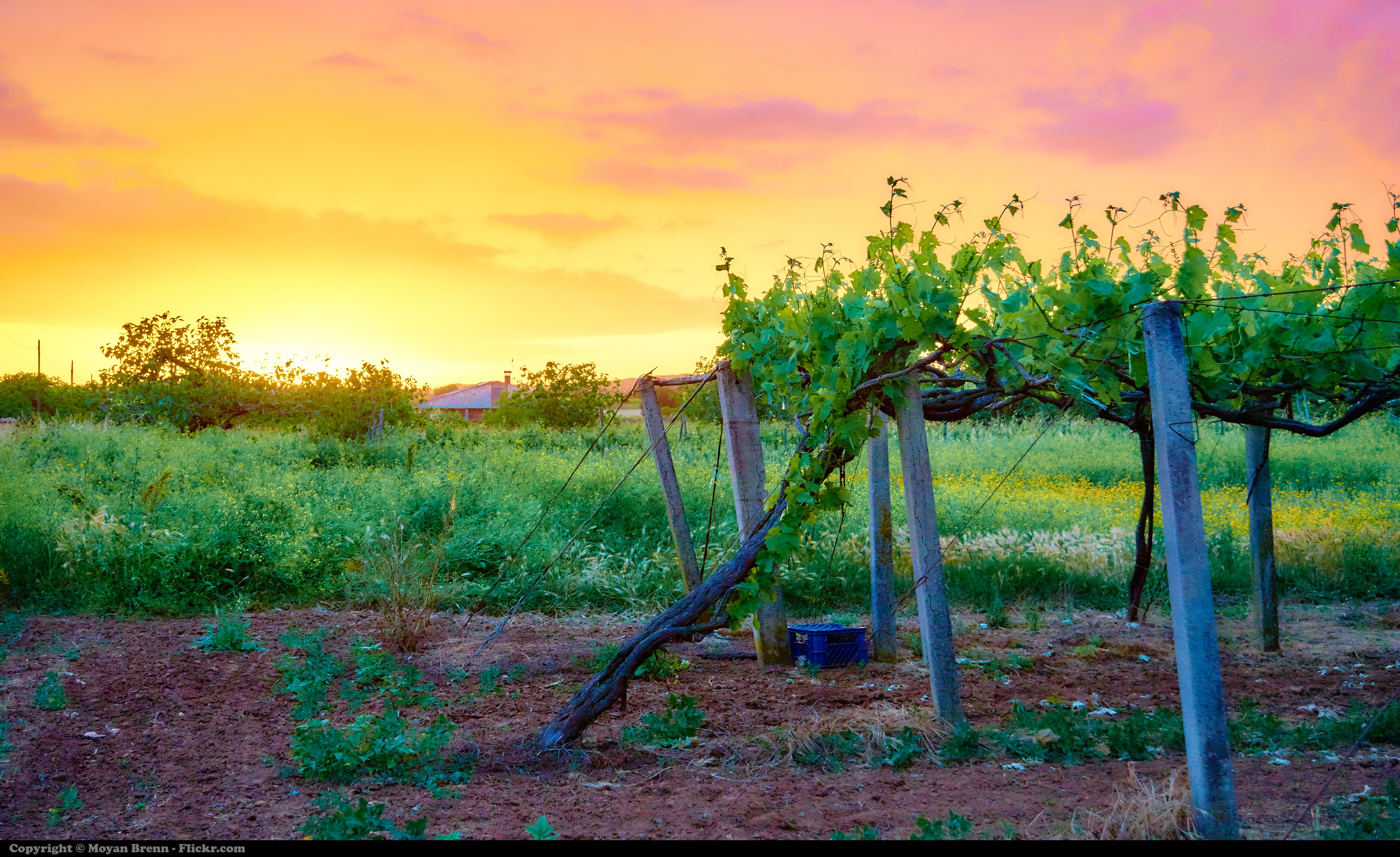
A winery outside the city of Nettuno

Nettuno is a DOC wine region in Lazio, Italy, producing both red, white and rosé wines. While the region is known for wine production since Roman times, the DOC was granted as late as in 2003. The DOC area comprises the communes of Nettuno and Anzio.

== Styles of wine ==
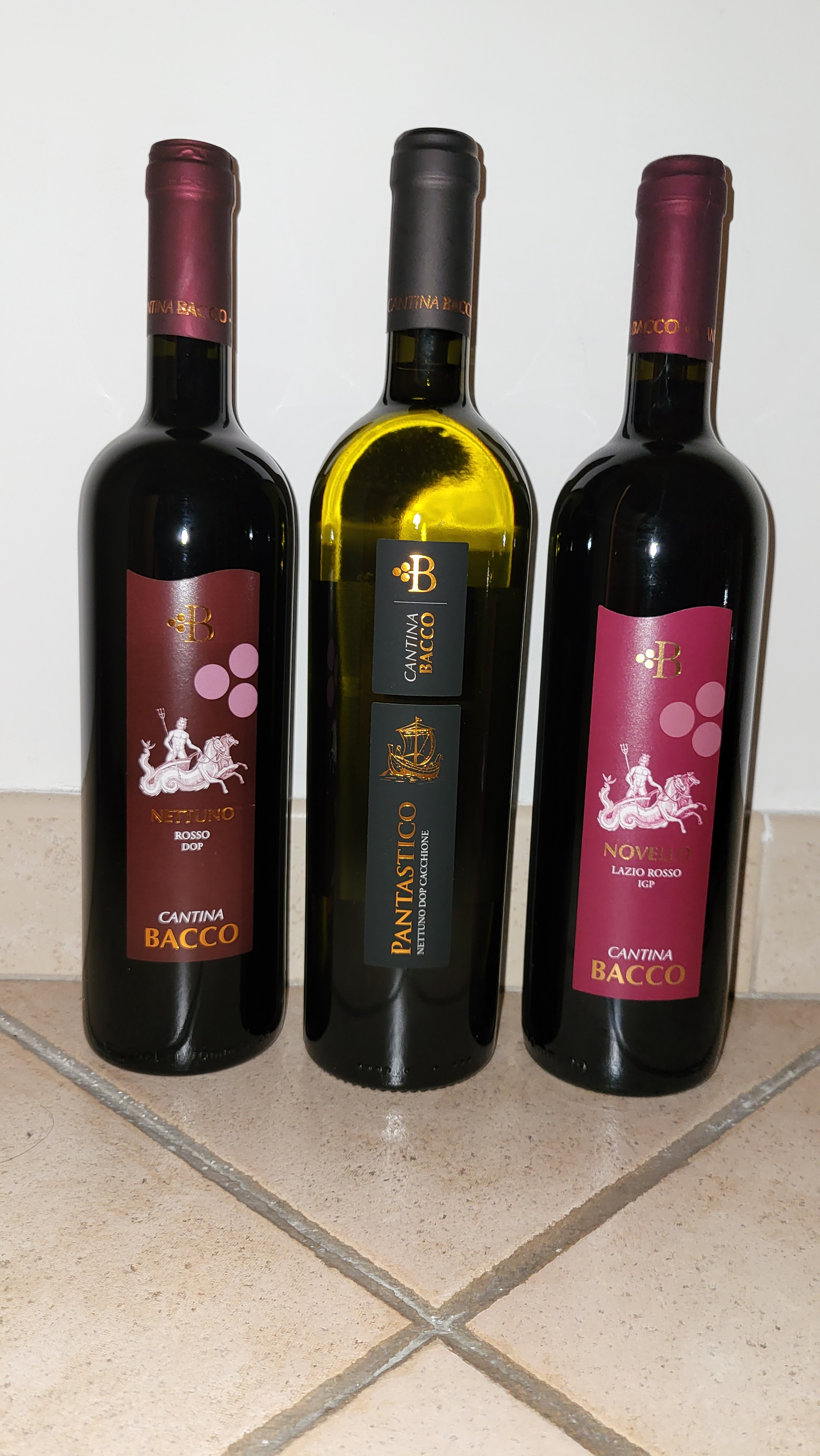
Two wine bottles (Rosso and Bellone) from Nettuno DOC/DOP and one Novello from Lazio IGT

The wines in the DOC appellation (sometimes called DOP) come in eight different styles. According to the current production regulations all cultivation, training and pruning must be done in a way suitable for not altering the characteristics of the grapes and wines. Emergency irrigation is permitted. All grapes must be suitable for cultivation in the Province of Rome and produced in the municipalities of Nettuno and Anzio, Grape types must be in the national registry of grape varieties.

The Nettuno DOC area is well suited for vines grown as "piede franco", that is without grafting. The former seabed soil makes it possible to use original European roots, unlike most old world wine districts.

=== Red wines ===
Nettuno Rosso DOC: Dry red wine, intense ruby. Blend of 30-70% Merlot and 30-50% Sangiovese. Up to 20% of other red grapes. A maximum yield of 30 tons/ha is allowed. By time of release for consumption it must have a minimum of 12.0% ABV.

Nettuno Novello DOC: A light red wine, medium to intense ruby, made in the novello style. Same grape varieties and composition and the same maximum yield as in the Rosso DOC. Minimum alcohol level 11.5% ABV.

=== White wines ===
Nettuno Bianco DOC: Fruity white wine, medium to intense straw yellow. Blend of 30-70% Bellone (locally known as Cacchione), 30-50% Trebbiano Toscano. Up to 20% other white grapes. Maximum yield 14 t/ha. By time of release for consumption it must have a minimum of 11.0% ABV.

Nettuno Bellone DOC or Nettuno Cacchione DOC: At least 85% Bellone grape. The remaining 15% can be other suitable grapes. Maximum yield 13 t/ha. By time of release for consumption it must have a minimum of 11.5% ABV.

Both white DOC types can be produced in secco (flat and dry) and frizzante (sparkling) versions, making a total of four white styles.

=== Rosé wine ===
Nettuno Rosato DOC: Medium to intense color, fresh and dry. At least 40% Sangiovese and at least 40% Trebbiano Toscano. Up to 20% of other grape types. Maximum yield 14 t/ha. By time of release for consumption it must have a minimum of 11.5% ABV.

The rosé wine can be produced in both secco and frizzante versions.
