= French ship Neptune =

A number of ships of the French Navy have borne the name Neptune, or a variant thereof:

- French ship Neptune (1610) (1610–1615), a privateer
- French ship Neptune (1628) (1628–1641), a 16-gun ship of the line
- French ship Neptune (1652) (1651–1655), a ship of the line
- French ship Neptune (1666) (1666–1671), a 64-gun ship of the line, also known as Illustre
- French ship Neptune (1671) (1671–1679), a 36-gun ship of the line, also known as Beaufort
- French ship Neptune (1679) (1670–1702), a 40-gun ship of the line
- French ship Neptune (1689), a 46-gun ship of the line
- French frigate Neptune (1697) (1697–1699), a 24-gun frigate
- French ship Neptune (1705) (1705–1713), a 64-gun ship of the line
- French ship Neptune (1716) (1716), a 74-gun ship of the line
- French ship Neptune (1723) (1724–1747), a 74-gun ship of the line
- French ship Neptune (1778) (1778–1795), a 74-gun ship of the line
- French corvette Neptune (1780), a corvette
- French schooner Neptune (1780) (1780–1782), a 6-gun schooner
- French corvette Neptune (1793), a 16-gun corvette
- French cutter Neptune (1794), a cutter
- French gunboat Neptune (1795) (1795–1798), a gunboat
- French lugger Neptune (1795) (1795), a lugger
- French schooner Neptune (1799) (1799–1799), a schooner
- French troopship Neptune (1801) (1801–1805), troopship n°188
- French troopship Neptune (1804) (1804–1808), troopship n°262
- French ship Neptune (1803), a Tonnant-class ship of the line launched in 1804, captured by the Spanish in 1808 and renamed Neptuno
- French xebec Neptune (1805) (1805–1814), a xebec
- French brig Nettuno (1807), a brig launched in Venice in 1807, that the Royal Navy captured in 1808 and that became HMS Cretan
- Neptune (1811–1814), an unbuilt 110-gun Commerce de Paris-class ship of the line
- French ship Neptune (1839) (1839–1858), an 80-gun ship of the line
- French battleship Neptune (1892–1908), a Marceau-class ironclad
- French ship Neptune (1914) (1914–1919), an auxiliary minesweeper
- French ship Neptune (1945), an ex-German ship of the Reichsbahn
