= Neptune Theatre Restaurant =

Defunct restaruant in Coller Quay, Singapore

- A postcard of the Neptune Theatre Restaurant in the 1970s, with dancers performing on stage (right)
- Interactive map of Neptune Theatre Restaurant

Restaurant information
- Established: 1972
- Closed: 2006
- Previous owner: Mandarin Singapore
- Food type: Cantonese and Chinese
- Location: 50 Collyer Quay, Singapore
- Coordinates: 1.2831°N 103.8530°E
- Seating capacity: 1500
- Other information: Also regularly hosted musical performances

The Neptune Theatre Restaurant (Chinese: 海星歌剧院) was a restaurant and entertainment venue in Collyer Quay, Singapore. Housed in the Overseas Union Building, it served Chinese food. It was also known for hosting a variety of performances, including topless revues, and was a popular venue for performances due to its spacious interior. Western and Asian acts performed there over the years. The restaurant also had its own dance troupe, the Neptune Dancers, that disbanded in 1986 due to high maintenance costs.

The restaurant opened in 1972 and was popular in the 1970s and 1980s for nightclubbing. However, it declined in popularity by the late 1980s and, from the 1990s to the 2000s, faced stiff competition from other entertainment venues in Singapore and Johor Bahru. Revue performances were withdrawn in April 2006, and the restaurant closed in December.

== History ==
The Neptune Theatre Restaurant was founded in 1972 by Mandarin Singapore, a hotel and restaurant operator. During its first month of operations, the opening act was performed by Taiwanese dance troupe E-Sha, though subsequent acts would be performed by Neptune's own dance troupe, the Neptune Dancers. During the 1970s and 1980s, the restaurant became a popular venue for nightclubbing. However, it had a rivalry with the Tropicana, another theatre-restaurant club. Mandarin Singapore announced on 6 May 1980 that they would close the Neptune Restaurant, but reversed their decision later in the month without giving a reason.

From the late 1980s, revues in Singapore – including Neptune – declined in popularity. Neptune restaurant had an average audience of 150 people on weekdays in 1988, though a large majority of its customers were from Japan. Following the Tropicana's closure, Neptune was considered by Jaime Koh and Lee-ling Ho of the National Library Board to be the only theatre-restaurant in Singapore and the only establishment to regularly host topless shows. From the 1990s to the 2000s, Neptune restaurant faced fierce competition from new entertainment establishments in Singapore and Johor Bahru. In a 2007 article published in Today, food critic Moses Lim said that, during the restaurant's later years of operation, community activities and charity events were held at the restaurant, though fewer patrons visited to eat dim sum. The restaurant withdrew revue services in April 2006. As Collyer Quay and Clifford Pier were marked for redevelopment by the Urban Redevelopment Authority, the Neptune Restaurant closed in December 2006. A performance, titled "The Cabaret Finale", was held on 29 December, featuring performances from Rick Price, the band Penny Lane, and Neptune's own dancers.

== Details ==
The Overseas Union House, where the Neptune Restaurant was located

The Neptune Theatre Restaurant was located in the Overseas Union House at Collyer Quay. During the day, it served dim sum, which was popular among office workers in the area. The restaurant also served wonton noodles, carrot cake, and chicken rice.

The restaurant was a popular venue for performances as it had a spacious interior – the restaurant had pillars that did not obstruct views, good acoustics, and a 23.2-metre (76 ft) rotating stage. Over the years, Neptune hosted various performances from different artists, including Asian artists such as Jenny Tseng and Teresa Teng; Western artists like Engelbert Humperdinck, Tom Jones, and Julio Iglesias; and local artists like Anita Sarawak. The restaurant had its own dance troupe, the Neptune Dancers. The choreographer Jung Suk Cheol was hired to recruit dancers for the troupe. He selected 20 local young men and women, but had to hire foreign female dancers, as nearly all of the female dancers dropped out due to the rigorous training. The Neptune Dancers performed Parisian-style dances and semi-Asian cultural dances, but were disbanded in 1986 due to high maintenance costs – the troupe spent S$100,000 (1986) (US$45,925.98) purchasing food, costumes, make-up, and props, as well as hiring foreign choreographers. For subsequent performances, the restaurant continued bringing in foreign revues.
