= HMS Neptune =

Nine ships and a naval base of the Royal Navy have been named HMS Neptune after the Roman god of the ocean:

- HMS Neptune (1683) was a 90-gun second rate launched in 1683. She was rebuilt in 1710 and 1730 before being renamed HMS Torbay in her new incarnation as a third rate in 1750. She was sold in 1784.
- HMS Neptune (1757) was a 90-gun second rate launched in 1757. She was hulked in 1784 and broken up in 1816.
- HMS Neptune (1797) was a 98-gun second rate launched in 1797. She fought at the battle of Trafalgar and was broken up in 1818.
- HMS Neptune was to have been a 120-gun first rate. She was renamed HMS Royal George (1827) in 1822, before being launched in 1827. Royal George was sold in 1875.
- HMS Neptune (1832) was a 120-gun first rate launched in 1832. She was rebuilt as a 72-gun third rate with screw propulsion in 1859 and was sold in 1875.
- HMS Neptune (1863) was a coastguard cutter built in 1863 and sold in 1905.
- HMS Neptune (1874) was an ironclad warship launched in 1874 as Independência, intended for the Brazilian Navy. Acquired by the Royal Navy in 1878, she was sold in 1903.
- HMS Neptune (1909) was an early dreadnought launched in 1909 and scrapped in 1922.
- HMS Neptune (20) was a Leander-class light cruiser launched in 1933 and sunk in a minefield off Tripoli in 1941.
- HMS Neptune was a projected Neptune-class cruiser in the 1945 Naval Estimates, but the plans were cancelled in March 1946 and she was never ordered.
- HMS Neptune (shore establishment) is the name given to the shore establishment at HMNB Clyde.

== Battle honours ==
- Barfleur, 1692
- Quebec, 1759
- Trafalgar, 1805
- Martinique, 1809
- Baltic, 1854
- Jutland, 1916
- Atlantic, 1939
- Calabria, 1940
- Mediterranean, 1940
- Bismarck, 1941
- Malta Convoys, 1941

== See also ==
- HSwMS Neptun, two submarines of the Swedish Navy
