= Neptun =

Neptun may refer to:

- Neptun (radar), a World War II German radar set
- Neptun, Romania
- Neptun Electronics, a retail chain in Albania
- Centrum Biurowe Neptun, a skyscraper in Gdańsk, Poland
- SK Neptun, Swedish swimming club
- Neptunkryssare, a class of sailboats
- R-360 Neptune ("Neptun"), a Ukrainian missile

== Ships ==
- Neptun (ship, 1693) , a warship of the city of Zurich
- Neptun (ship, 1965) , steamboat that operated from 1865 to 1939 on Lake Constance
- Neptun (ship, 1875) , steamship that sank in 1880 in Lake Biel
- Neptun (ship, 1925) , passenger ship
- Neptun (ship, 1926) , combined cable-layer and tanker
- HSwMS Neptun (1942), a Neptun-class submarine commissioned in 1943 and decommissioned in 1966
- HSwMS Neptun (1979), a Näcken-class submarine commissioned in 1980 and decommissioned in 1998, now a museum ship

== See also ==
- Neptune (disambiguation)
- Neptuno (ship)
