= USS Neptune (1863) =

Gunboat of the United States Navy

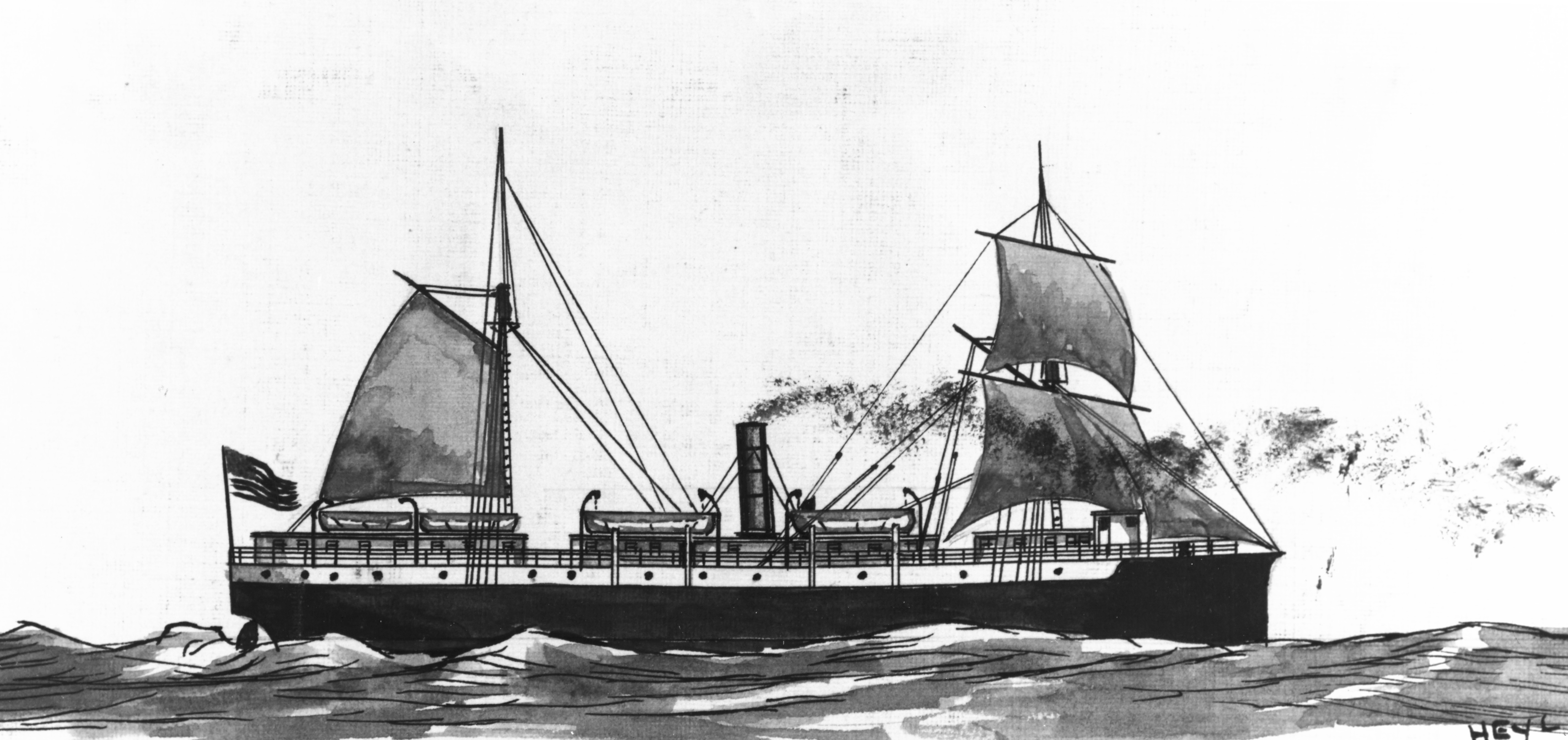
- Allegany (formerly USS Neptune) in postwar merchant service

History

United States
- Name: USS Neptune
- Namesake: Previous name retained
- Launched: 11 Feb 1863
- Acquired: 17 July 1863
- Commissioned: 19 December 1863
- Decommissioned: 31 May 1865
- Fate: Sold 12 July 1865; Stranded 5 December 1865

General characteristics
- Displacement: 1,244 long tons (1,264 t)
- Length: 209 ft (64 m)
- Beam: 34 ft 6 in (10.52 m)
- Depth of hold: 20 ft 8 in (6.30 m)
- Propulsion: steam engine; screw-propelled
- Speed: 11 knots (20 km/h; 13 mph)
- Complement: 173
- Armament: one 100-pounder gun; two 30-pounder Parrott rifles; eight 32-pounder guns
- Armor: wood

USS Neptune was a large steamer, with powerful guns and a large crew, acquired by the United States Navy for service with the Union Navy during the American Civil War. She served the Navy primarily, as an armed escort vessel in the West Indies for Union Navy and commercial ships traveling through that area on their way to and from California.

== Acquisition and commissioning ==
Neptune, a wooden steamer, was purchased by the U.S. Navy at New York City on 17 July 1863 from William P. Williamson of the Neptune Steamship Company. She was delivered to the United States Government at the New York Navy Yard in Brooklyn, New York, on 3 September 1863, and was commissioned there on 19 December 1863.

== Service history ==
Assigned to the West India Squadron, Neptune departed New York City on 9 January 1864 and operated principally in convoying steamers bound for California through the West Indies. At the end of the American Civil War in 1865, she returned to New York City, where she was decommissioned on 31 May 1865.

== Fate ==
Neptune was sold at auction at New York City on 12 July 1865 to John Henderson. She operated briefly in commercial service before being stranded in fog off Long Island, New York, on 5 December 1865.

== See also ==
- Confederate States Navy
