= USS Clyde (1863) =

Gunboat of the United States Navy

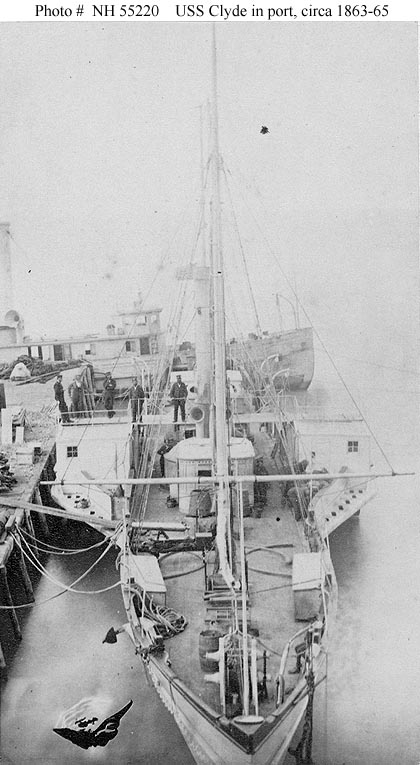
- USS Clyde tied up in port, circa 1863–1865. Note this former blockade runner's pivot-mounted Dahlgren howitzer

History

United States
- Name: USS Clyde
- Ordered: as Neptune
- Acquired: 29 July 1863
- Commissioned: 29 July 1863
- Decommissioned: 17 August 1865
- Stricken: 1865 (est.)
- Captured: by Union Navy forces; 14 June 1863
- Fate: Sold, 25 October 1865

General characteristics
- Type: Steamer
- Displacement: 294 long tons (299 t)
- Length: 200 ft 6 in (61.11 m)
- Beam: 18 ft 6 in (5.64 m)
- Draft: 8 ft (2.4 m)
- Propulsion: Steam engine; side wheel-propelled
- Speed: 9 kn (10 mph; 17 km/h)
- Complement: 67
- Armament: 2 × 24-pounder howitzers

USS Clyde was a paddle steamer captured by the Union Navy during the American Civil War, and commissioned to patrol Florida waters. She had been built in 1861 in Glasgow, Scotland as the Clyde passenger steamer Neptune, but sold in 1863 to become a blockade runner, making two successful round trips to Mobile, Alabama before capture. After the war she was sold to mercantile interests as Indian River, but lost shortly afterwards.

== River Clyde ==
The iron-hulled Neptune was launched in 1861 at the shipyard of Robert Napier and Sons at Govan for James S. Napier and James McIntyre, Glasgow. She was 211.7 feet (64.5 m) long, 18.8 ft (5.7 m) in breadth and 8.2 ft (2.5 m) deep and measured 260 tons burthen, 200 grt and 126 nrt. The ship was powered by a two-cylinder diagonal direct-acting steam engine, rated at 100 nhp and 995 ihp, also made by Napier, and driving a pair of side paddles. On trials on 31 May 1861 Neptune was recorded in the shipyard's records as achieving 17.63 knots (32.65 km/h; 20.29 mph) knots, making her "the fastest steamer afloat".

Neptune made her maiden sailing the following day between Greenock, Renfrewshire and Rothesay, on the Isle of Bute. By running from Greenock in conjunction with the trains from Glasgow, a much faster transit was offered compared with the all-water services from central Glasgow. She also ran the full route to Glasgow, occasionally becoming involved in the dangerous practice of racing against her crack rivals of 1861, Ruby and Rothesay Castle.

== U.S. Navy service ==
Neptune—a sidewheel steamer—was captured on 14 June 1863 by Lackawanna and sent to Key West, Florida for condemnation. Sent to New York City to be surveyed and appraised, she was purchased by the Navy Department and placed in commission on 29 July 1863, Acting Master A. A. Owens in command.

Departing New York on 30 July 1863, the steamer arrived at Washington, D.C., on 3 August. Her name was changed to Clyde on 11 August. Clyde sailed from Washington on 6 September and arrived at Key West on 13 September for duty with the East Gulf Blockading Squadron. She patrolled the coastal and inland waters of western Florida and among the Florida Keys until the end of the war. She captured the schooner Amaranth on 27 September, and participated in two boat expeditions up the Suwannee River and the Waccasassa River, capturing nearly 200 bales of cotton. Arriving at Philadelphia Navy Yard on 10 August 1865, Clyde was decommissioned on 17 August, taken to New York City and sold on 25 October.

=== Mercantile service ===
Henry Titus purchased the Clyde and renamed her the Indian River. He intended to use the steamer for shipping canned fish and oyster from the Indian River in Florida. Upon arriving at Indian River Inlet, the steamer grounded hard in the shallow inlet and could not be refloated.
