= Spanish ship Neptuno =

At least six ships of the Spanish Navy have been named Neptuno:

- Spanish ship Neptuno (1740) was a 66-gun ship of the line acquired in 1740 and sold in 1748
- Spanish ship Neptuno (1754) was a 68-gun ship of the line, launched 6 July 1754, commissioned in 1754 and scuttled in la Havana in 1762
- Spanish ship Neptuno (1795) was an 80-gun, launched in 1795 and wrecked in 1805
- Spanish ship Neptuno (1808) was an 80-gun ship of the line, previously the French ship Neptune. She was captured in 1808 and broken up in 1820.
- Spanish minelayer Neptuno (F-01) was a Júpiter-class gunboat-minelayer, commissioned in 1939, reclassified as a frigate and decommissioned in 1972
- Spanish ship Neptuno (A-20) is a submarine rescue ship, active since 1989.
