= List of beaches in New England =

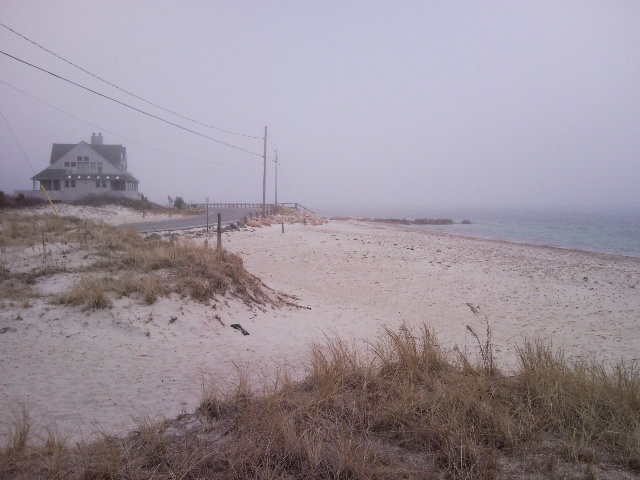
A beach on the coast of Massachusetts on a foggy early spring day

This is a list of beaches in New England sorted by state, then town. Beaches are not exclusively on seashores, but may also be located on lakes, rivers or other bodies of water.

== Connecticut ==
Connecticut's southern shore with 618 miles (995 km) of tidal coastline offers many beaches on the Long Island Sound and inland:

- Bridgeport
  - Pleasure Beach
  - Seaside Park
- Brookfield
  - Brookfield Town Beach (not on shoreline)
  - Lillinonah Woods Beach (not on shoreline)
- Clinton
  - Clinton Town Beach
- Colchester
  - Day Pond State Park (not on shoreline)
- Coventry
  - Lisicke Beach
  - Patriots Park
- East Lyme
  - Rocky Neck State Park
  - McCook's Beach
  - Hole in the Wall Beach
- Ellington
  - Sandy Beach on Crystal Lake
- Fairfield
  - Jennings Beach
  - Lake Mohegan
  - Penfield Beach and Rickards Beach
  - Fairfield Beach
  - South Pine Creek Beach
  - Sasco Beach
  - Southport Beach
- Griswold
  - Hopeville Pond State Park (not on shoreline)
- Guilford
  - Lake Quonnipaug
  - Jacob's Beach
- Groton
  - Bluff Point Beach
  - Eastern Point Beach
- Madison
  - Hammonasset Beach State Park
- Milford
  - Gulf Beach
  - Silver Sands State Park
- New Fairfield
  - New Fairfield Town Park (not on shoreline)
  - Squantz Pond State Park (not on shoreline)
- New Haven
  - Lighthouse Point Park
- New London
  - Ocean Beach Park
- Niantic
  - Crescent Beach
- Norwalk
  - Calf Pasture Beach and Shady Beach
- Old Lyme
  - Sound View Beach
- Old Saybrook
  - Harvey's Beach
- Stratford
  - Long Beach
  - Short Beach
- West Haven
  - West Haven Beaches (Bradley Point, Morse Beach, Oak Street Beach, Sandy Point)
- Westport
  - Sherwood Island State Park
  - Compo Beach
  - Burying Hill Beach
  - Old Mill Beach

== Maine ==
Maine's 3,478-mile (5,597 km) Atlantic Ocean coast and nearby islands offer many sandy beaches. From east (north) to west (south):

- Down East
  - Eastport - Shackford Head State Park - Cony Beach
  - Machiasport - Jasper Beach
  - Roque Bluffs - Roque Bluffs State Park
  - Mount Desert Island
    - Bar Harbor - Sand Beach in Acadia National Park
    - Mount Desert - Little Hunters Beach in Acadia National Park
  - Lamoine - Lamoine Beach Park / Lamoine State Park
- Penobscot Bay
  - Isle au Haut - Barred Harbor
  - Deer Island - Barred Island Preserve (low tide only)
  - Castine - Wadsworth Cove Beach
  - Stockton Springs - Sandy Point Beach
  - Islesboro
    - Beach at Turtle Head Preserve
    - Sprague's Beach
    - Warren Island State Park
    - Big Tree Beach
    - Billys Shore
    - Islesboro Town Beach
  - Searsport - Moose Point State Park
  - Belfast
    - Public Shore along Searsport Ave
    - Heritage Park
  - Northport
    - Cals Beach (private)
    - Pebble Beach (rocky, private)
  - Lincolnville
    - Wales Beach (private)
    - Lincolnville Beach
  - Camden - Laite Memorial Beach
  - Rockland
    - Beach along Rockland Harbor Trail
    - South End Beach
  - Owls Head
    - Beach at Ocean Avenue
    - Owls Head State Park
    - Crescent Beach
    - Crocketts Beach
    - Ash Point Beach
    - Lucia Beach (private)
    - Birch Point State Park
- Mid Coast
  - Bristol
    - Colonial Pemaquid Beach
    - Pemaquid Beach Park
  - South Bristol - Sand Cove Beach
  - Georgetown - Reid State Park
    - East Beach
    - Mile Beach
    - Half Mile Beach
  - Phippsburg
    - Popham Beach
    - Seawall Beach
    - Head Beach
- Southern Maine Coast
  - Harpswell - Cedar Beach, Bailey Island
  - Freeport - Winslow Memorial Park
  - Yarmouth
    - Sandy Point Bridge, Cousins Island
    - Littlejohn Beach, Cousins Island
  - Cumberland - Broad Cove Reserve
  - Long Island
    - East End Beach
    - Andrews Beach
    - South Beach
    - Fowler Beach
  - Portland
    - East End Beach
    - Big Beach, Cushing Island
    - Little Beach, Cushing Island
    - West Shore Sandy Beach, Little Diamond Island
  - South Portland - Willard Beach
  - Cape Elizabeth
    - Cliff House Beach
    - Crescent Beach State Park
  - Scarborough
    - Higgins Beach
    - Scarborough Beach State Park
    - Western Beach (private)
    - Back Shore
    - Pine Point Beach (contiguous with Old Orchard Beach)
    - Grand Beach (contiguous with Old Orchard Beach)
  - Old Orchard Beach
  - Saco, Maine - Ferry Beach State Park (contiguous with Old Orchard Beach)
  - Biddeford
    - Hills Beach
    - Fortunes Rocks Beach
    - Horseshoe Cove
    - New Barn Cove
  - Kennebunkport
    - Arundel Beach (rocky)
    - Colony Beach
    - Goose Rocks Beach
    - Cleaves Cove Beach
  - Kennebunk
    - Gooch's Beach
    - Middle Beach
    - Mother's Beach
    - Kennebunk Beach
    - Parson's Beach
    - Laudholm Beach
  - Wells
    - Drakes Island Beach
    - Wells Beach
    - Moody Beach (private)
  - Ogunquit
    - Footbridge Beach
    - Ogunquit Beach
  - York
    - Short Sands Beach (village of York Beach)
    - Long Sands Beach (village of York Beach)
    - York Harbor Beach
  - Kittery
    - Seapoint Beach
    - Crescent Beach
    - Fort Foster Beach

Lakes, ponds, and rivers:

- Richmond - Peacock Beach State Park
- Greenville, Maine - Moosehead Lake - Lily Bay State Park
- Poland - Range Ponds State Park
- Sebago Lake State Park
- Ellsworth - Branch Lake Beach
- Canaan - Lake George Beach
- Newcastle - Shoreline Beach, Damariscotta River
- Rockland - Johnson Memorial Park, Chickawaukie Pond
- Camden - Barrett's Cove Public Beach, Megunticook Lake

== Massachusetts ==
Salt-water beaches in Massachusetts are entirely in the eastern part of the state, concentrated in particular in Cape Cod and islands along its 1,519 miles (2,445 km) of coastline: Inland beaches are on ponds, beaches, and rivers.

=== Cape Cod ===
- Barnstable
  - Bone Hill
  - Bridge Street
  - Cordwood
  - Covells Beach
  - Craigville Beach
  - Crockers Neck
  - Cross Street
  - Dowses Beach
  - East Beach
  - Estey Avenue Beach
  - Fifth Ave
    - Fifth Ave (boat launch)
  - Indian Trail
  - Kalmus Ocean
  - Kalmus Yacht
  - Kennedy Memorial
  - Keyes Beach
  - Little River
  - Loops Beach
  - Millway
  - Oregon Beach
  - Oyster Place Road
  - Prince Cove
  - Ropes Beach
  - Sandy Neck
  - Scudder Lane
  - Veterans Beach
  - Wianno Avenue
- Bourne
  - Barlows Landing
  - Cataumet Harbor
  - Electric Avenue
  - Gray Gables
  - Monument Beach
  - Patiusset Beach
  - Sagamore Beach
  - Scenic Park
- Brewster
  - Breakwater
  - Cliff Pond Beach, Nickerson State Park
  - Crosby
  - Ellis
  - Flax Pond Beach, Nickerson State Park
  - Linnell Landing Beach
  - Little Cliff Pond, Nickerson State Park
  - Paines Creek
  - Point of Rocks
  - Robbins Hill
  - Saints
- Chatham
  - Andrew Hardings Lane Beach
  - Bucks Creek
  - Cockle Cove Beach
    - Cockle Cove Creek at Parking Lot
    - Cockle Cove Creek at Ridgevale Bridge
  - Forest Street Beach
  - Hardings Beach East
  - Hardings Beach West
  - Jacknife Harbor Beach
  - Lighthouse Beach
  - Oyster Pond Beach
  - Pleasant Street Beach
  - Ridgevale Beach
  - Scatteree Town Landing
- Dennis
  - Bayview
  - Chapin Memorial Beach
  - Cold Storage
  - Corporation
  - Crowes Pasture Beach
  - Follins Pond
  - Glendon Road
  - Haigis
  - Harborview
  - Howes Street
  - Inman
  - Mayflower Beach
  - Raycroft
  - Sea Street
    - Sea Street (Dennisport)
    - Sea Street (East Dennis)
  - South Village
  - Sullivan
  - Trotting Park
  - West Dennis
    - West Dennis (Residential)
    - West Dennis (W. of Snack Bar)
    - West Dennis (West)
- Eastham
  - Boat Meadow
  - Campground
  - Coast Guard Beach, Cape Cod National Seashore
    - Coast Guard Beach 1
    - Coast Guard Beach 2
  - Cole Road
  - Cooks Brook
  - Dyer Prince
  - First Encounter
    - First Encounter (Beach)
    - First Encounter (Spit River)
  - Kingsbury
  - Nauset Light Beach, Cape Cod National Seashore
    - Nauset Light Beach 1
    - Nauset Light Beach 2
    - Nauset Light Beach 3
  - South Sunken Meadow
  - Thumpertown
  - Town Cove
- Falmouth
  - Bristol Beach
  - Chappaquoit Beach
  - Falmouth Heights Beach
  - Megansett Beach
  - Menauhant Beach
  - Old Silver Beach
  - Surf Drive Beach
  - Woodneck Beach
- Harwich
  - Atlantic Avenue Beach
  - Bank Street Beach
  - Belmont Road Beach
  - Brooks Road Beach
  - Bucks Pond
  - Cahoon's Road Beach
  - Earle Road Beach
  - Gray Neck Road Beach
  - Hinkley's Pond
  - Jackknife Beach, Pleasant Bay
  - Long Pond
  - Merkel Beach
  - Neel Road Beach
  - Pleasant Road Beach
  - Red River Beach
  - Sand Pond
  - Sea Street Beach
  - Seymour Pond
  - Wah-Wah-Taysee Road Beach
  - Windemere Bluffs Beach
  - Zylpha Road Beach
- Mashpee
  - South Cape Beach, South Cape Beach State Park
- Orleans
  - Nauset Beach
  - Skaket Beach
- Provincetown
  - Herring Cove, Cape Cod National Seashore
  - Race Point, Cape Cod National Seashore
- Sandwich
  - Scusset Beach, Scusset Beach State Reservation
- Truro
  - Beach Point (Truro, Massachusetts)
  - Coast Guard Beach a.k.a. "Highland Beach"
  - Fisher Beach
  - Head of the Meadow, Cape Cod National Seashore
  - High Head Beach
  - Longnook Beach
  - Noon's Landing
- Wellfleet
  - Cahoon Hollow Beach, Cape Cod National Seashore
  - Marconi Beach, Cape Cod National Seashore

=== Martha's Vineyard ===
- Chilmark
  - Chilmark Pond Preserve
  - Great Rock Bight
  - Lucy Vincent Beach
    - Lucy Vincent Beach - Chilmark Pond
    - Lucy Vincent Beach - Ocean
  - Menemsha Beach
  - Menemsha Pond
  - Squibnocket Beach
- Edgartown
  - Bend-in-the-Road Beach
  - Chappy Point Beach
  - East Beach
    - East Beach (Chappy)
  - Edgartown Great Pond
  - Felix Neck
  - Fuller Street
  - Joseph Sylvia Big Bridge
  - Joseph Sylvia Sound
  - Norton Point Beach
    - Norton Point Beach - east Katama Bay
    - Norton Point Beach - east ocean
    - Norton Point Beach - west bay (boat launch)
    - Norton Point Beach - west ocean
  - South Beach State Park
    - South Beach State Park - Middle
    - South Beach State Park - Right Fork West
  - Wasque Swim Beach
- Fairhaven
  - Fort Phoenix, Fort Phoenix State Reservation
  - Knollmere
  - Manhattan Avenue
  - Raymond Street
  - West Island
    - West Island - Causeway
    - West Island - Towns Beach
  - Weeden Rd

=== Nantucket ===
- Nantucket
  - Brant Point
  - Children's Beach
  - Cisco Beach
  - Dionis Beach
  - Francis Street
  - Jetties Beach
  - Madaket Beach
  - Siasconset Beach
  - Surfside Beach

=== North Shore ===
- Beverly
  - Brackenbury
  - Dane Street
    - Dane Street Bathhouse
    - Dane Street Jetty
    - Dane Street Outfall
  - Goat Hill
  - Independence
  - Lynch Park
  - Mingo
  - Ober Park
  - Rice Beach
    - Rice Outfall
  - Sandy Point
  - West Beach
  - Woodbury
- Essex
  - Clammers Beach
  - Front Beach
- Gloucester
  - Coffins Beach
  - Cressy's Beach
  - Good Harbor Beach
  - Half Moon Beach
  - Magnolia Beach
  - Niles Beach
  - Pavilion Beach
  - Plum Cove Beach
  - Wingaersheek Beach
- Ipswich
  - Clark Beach
  - Crane Beach
  - Pavilion Beach
  - Plum Island
  - Steep Hill Beach
- Lynn
  - Kings Beach, Lynn Shores Reservation
- Manchester-by-the-Sea
  - Singing Beach
- Nahant
  - Nahant Beach, Lynn Shores Reservation
- Newbury/Newburyport
  - Plum Island
- Revere
  - Revere Beach, Revere Beach Reservation
- Rockport
  - Cape Hedge Beach
  - Front Beach/Back Beach
  - Long Beach
- Rowley
  - Plum Island
- Salisbury
  - Salisbury Beach, Salisbury Beach State Reservation
- Swampscott
  - Eismans Beach
  - Fishermans Beach
  - Kings Beach
  - Phillips Beach

=== Boston Harbor ===
- Boston
  - Dorchester Bay
    - Old Harbor Reservation
      - Carson Beach
      - L Street Beach
      - M Street Beach
      - City Point Beach at Farragut Road
      - Pleasure Bay beaches (on Day Boulevard side and Castle Island
    - Dorchester Shores Reservation (discontinuous)
      - Malibu Beach
      - Savin Hill Beach
      - Tenean Beach (Neponset River)
  - Constitution Beach, Belle Isle Marsh Reservation
  - Boston Harbor Islands National Recreation Area
    - Bumpkin Island
    - Lovell's Island Beach
    - Spectacle Island
- Winthrop
  - Short Beach, Belle Isle Reservation
  - Winthrop Beach, Belle Isle Marsh Reservation
  - Yirrell Beach, Belle Isle Marsh Reservation

=== South Shore ===
- Braintree
  - Smith Beach
  - Sunset Lake
- Cohasset
  - Black Rock Beach
  - Little Harbor
  - Sailing Club
  - Sandy Beach
  - Sandy Cove
  - Yacht Club
- Duxbury
  - Duxbury Beach
  - Hardin Hill
  - Howlands Landing
  - Landing Road
  - Residents Beach
  - Shipyard Lane
  - West End
- Hull
  - Nantasket Beach, Nantasket Reservation
- Plymouth
  - Charge Pond Beach, Myles Standish State Forest
  - College Pond Beach, Myles Standish State Forest
  - Curlew Pond Beach, Myles Standish State Forest
  - Fearings Pond Beach, Myles Standish State Forest
  - Plymouth Long Beach
  - White Horse Beach
- Quincy
  - Wollaston Beach, Quincy Shore Reservation
- Scituate
  - Humarock Beach

=== South Coast ===
- Dartmouth
  - Anthonys
  - Apponagansett Town Beach
  - Barneys Joy
  - Bayview
  - Demarest Lloyd Beach, Demarest Lloyd State Park
  - Hidden Bay
  - Jones Town Beach
  - Moses Creek
  - Nonquitt
  - Oak Hill Shores
  - Round Hill
  - Salters Point East
  - Salters Point South
- Freetown
  - Assonet:
    - Assonet Bay Shores Association Beach (private)
    - Porter Pastures Beach
  - East Freetown:
    - Town Beach
- Westport
  - Horseneck Beach, Horseneck Beach State Reservation

=== Inland ===
- Carver
  - Barretts Pond, Myles Standish State Forest
- Concord
  - Walden Pond, Walden Pond State Reservation
- Danvers
  - Sandy Beach East
  - Sandy Beach West
- Milton
  - Houghton's Pond, Blue Hills Reservation
- Natick
  - Cochituate Lake Beach, Cochituate State Park
- North Andover
  - Berry Pond Beach, Harold Parker State Forest
  - Frye Pond Beach, Harold Parker State Forest
- Taunton
  - Middle Pond Beach, Massasoit State Park
  - Watson Pond Beach, Watson Pond State Park
- Saugus
  - Pearce Lake, Breakheart Reservation
  - Peckham Pond, Breakheart Reservation
- Winchester
  - Sandy Beach, Mystic River Reservation

== New Hampshire ==
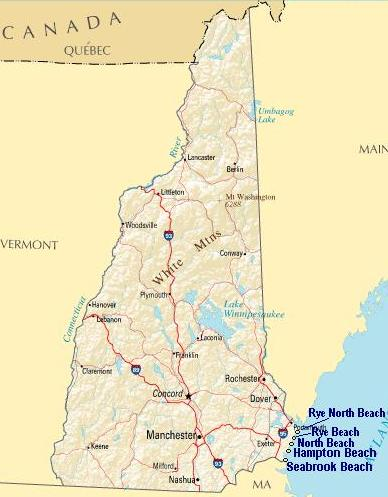
Location of New Hampshire beaches

Despite having a tidal coastline of just 131 miles (211 km) and an ocean shoreline of just 18 miles (29 km), New Hampshire has at least 10 oceanfront beaches:

- Hampton
  - Hampton Beach, Hampton Beach State Park
  - North Beach
- New Castle
  - Great Island Common
- North Hampton
  - North Hampton Beach State Park
- Rye
  - Bass Beach
  - Cable Beach
  - Jenness Beach State Park
  - Rye Beach
  - Rye North Beach
  - Wallis Sands State Beach
- Seabrook
  - Seabrook Beach

== Rhode Island ==
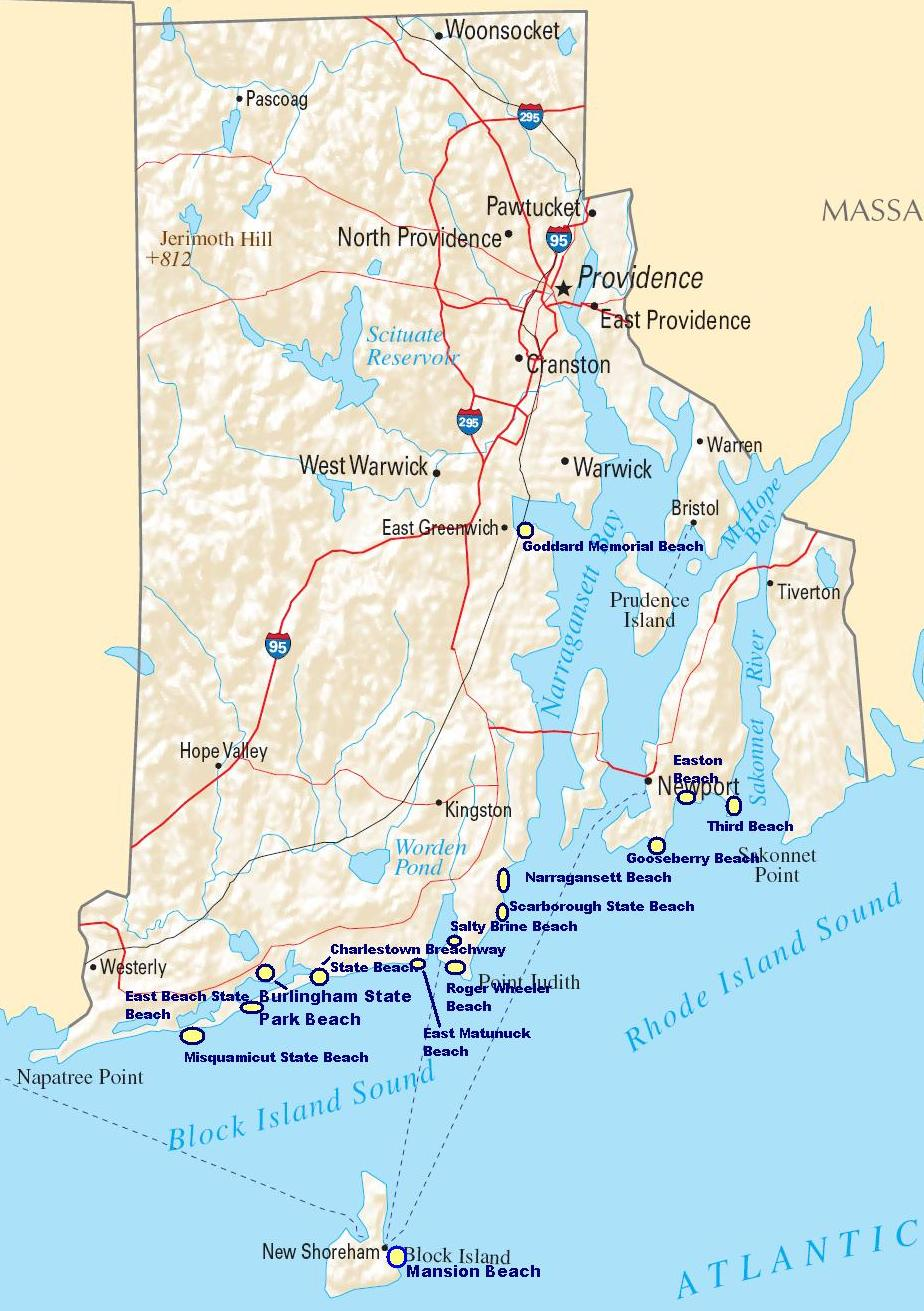
Partial map of Rhode Island beaches

Rhode Island has saltwater beaches along Narragansett Bay and the Atlantic Ocean from which it gets its state nickname, "The Ocean State". In addition, the state has several freshwater beaches along its rivers.

Kickemuit River beaches:

- Bristol - Juniper Trail Beach

Sakonnet River beaches:

- Tiverton (east side)
  - Grinnell's Beach
  - Fogland Beach
- Portsmouth (northwest side)
  - Teddy's Beach
  - Grimmell Beach
  - Island Park Beach
  - McCorrie Point Beach
  - Sandy Point Beach
  - Pebble Beach
- Middletown (southwest side)
  - Third Beach

Providence River beaches:

- Edgewood Beach, Cranston
- Sabin Point Waterfront Park (no swimming)
- Alling Beach, Barrington
- (more beaches on both sides with no names on Google Maps as of 30 Jun 2021)

Narragansett Bay beaches include:

- Barrington
  - Barrington Beach
- Warren:
  - Warren Town Beach
- Bristol:
  - Bristol Town Beach
  - Walley Street Beach
- Prudence Island:
  - Prudence Beach
- Warwick
  - Conimicut Point Beach
  - Bayside Beach
  - Longmeadow Beach
  - Rocky Point Beach
  - Oakland Beach
  - Buttonwood Beach in Warwick City Park
  - Goddard Memorial State Beach, Goddard Memorial State Park
- East Greenwich
  - End of the World Beach
  - Sandy Point Beach
- North Kingstown
  - Beach at Bluff Point
  - Calf Pasture Point Beach
  - Spink Neck Beach
  - Compass Rose Beach
  - Blue Beach
  - North Kingstown Town Beach
  - Ed's Beach
  - Beach at Rome Point
  - Plum Point Beach (Plum Beach)
- Narragansett
  - Beach at South Ferry Road
  - Kelly Beach
  - Bonnet Shores Beach
- Aquidneck Island (west side)
  - Portsmouth
    - Newport Beach Club (private)
  - Newport (east to west)
    - King Park Beach on Wellington Avenue
    - Fort Adams State Park
      - Fort Adams State Beach on Fort Adams Drive
      - A small beach on Lincoln Drive
    - Stalnaker Beach
- Jamestown (Conanicut Island, north to south)
  - Sunset Beach
  - Shores Beach
  - Longs Beach
  - East Ferry Beach
  - Mackerel Cove Beach
  - Old Salt Work Beach

Main Atlantic coast beaches include, from east to west:

- Little Compton
  - South Shore Beach a.k.a. Town of Little Compton Beach
  - Goosewing Beach (owned by The Nature Conservancy, includes Benjamin Family Environmental Center, adjacent to Quicksand Pond, accessed from South Shore Beach)
  - Beach at Little Pond Cove
  - Beach at Briggs Marsh
  - Warren's Point Beach Club (private)
  - Beach at Round Pond
  - Lloyd's Beach
  - Tappens Beach
- Middletown
  - Sachuest Beach (Second Beach)
- Newport
  - Atlantic Beach (contiguous with Easton's Beach across a small creek)
  - Easton's Beach (First Beach)
  - Belmont Beach (small, rocky)
  - Rejects' Beach or People's Beach (contiguous with Bailey's Beach, at the end of the Newport Cliff Walk)
  - Bailey's Beach (private)
  - Gooseberry Beach (privately owned but open to public)
  - Hazard's Beach (privately owned)
  - King's Beach on Ocean Avenue
  - Collins Beach
- Jamestown
  - Mackerel Cove
- Narragansett
  - Dunes Club Beach
  - Conochet Club Beach
  - Narragansett Town Beach
  - Punk Rock Beach / Point Judith (rocky)
  - Camp Cronin Fishing Area / Point Judith in south parcel of Fishermen's Memorial State Park (rocky)
  - Roger Wheeler State Beach a.k.a. Sand Cove Beach (contiguous to the west)
  - Galilee Beach Club Beach (contiguous)
  - Salty Brine State Beach (contiguous to the east)
  - Scarborough State Beach Complex - North & South
- South Kingstown
  - East Matunuck State Beach
  - Deep Hole Fishing Area
  - Matunuck Beach
  - South Kingstown Town Beach (contiguous with Willow Dell Beach)
  - Willow Dell Beach (contiguous with neighboring beaches)
  - Roy Carpenter's Beach (contiguous with neighboring beaches)
  - Moonstone Beach (contiguous with neighboring beaches, formerly a nude beach)
- Charlestown (neighborhood of Quonochontaug)
  - Blue Shutters Town Beach
  - Burlingame State Park
  - Charlestown Breachway State Beach, Charlestown Breachway
  - Charlestown Town Beach
  - East Beach State Beach, Ninigret Conservation Area
  - Central Beach
  - West Beach
- Westerly
  - Weekapaug Beech
  - Weekapaug Inn Beach
  - Fenway Beach (in the neighborhood of Weekapaug)
  - Dune's Park Beach (private but open to public for fee)
  - Seaside Beach Club Beach (members only)
  - Westerly Town Beach (residents only, contiguous with neighboring beaches)
  - Atlantic Beach (contiguous)
  - Westerly New Town Beach a.k.a. Wuskenau Beach
  - Jim's Beach Misquamicut (contiguous)
  - Misquamicut State Beach
  - Misquamicut Fire District Beaches (residents only, contiguous)
    - Lawton Beach
    - Benson Beach
    - Clark Farms Beach
  - East Beach (contiguous with neighboring beaches)
  - Ocean House Beach
  - Watch Hill Beach
  - Napatree Point

Block Island beaches include:

- Crescent Beach
- Surfers Beach
- Mansion Beach

Lake and pond beaches include:

- Providence County (north):
  - Gillerans Pond Beach, Burrillville
  - Wescott Beach, Glocester
  - Keech Pond Beach, Glocester
  - Steers Beach, Glocester
  - Mountaindale Beach, Smithfield
  - Slacks Pond Beach, Smithfield
  - Hope Pond Recreation Area beach, Scituate
  - Georgiaville Beach, Smithfield
- Kent County (central):
  - Briar Point Beach, Coventry
  - Gorton Pond, Warwick
  - Little Pond, Warwick
  - Sand Pond, Warwick
- Washington County (south):
  - Browning Mill Pond Area Beach, Richmond
  - Burlingame State Park Beach, Watchaug Pond, Charlestown

== Vermont ==
=== Lake Champlain ===
Lake Champlain beaches by municipality:

- Addison
  - D.A.R. State Park
- Alburgh
  - Alburg Dunes State Park
- Burlington
  - North Beach
- Colchester
  - Mallets Bay
- Grand Isle
  - Grand Isle State Park
- Milton
  - Sand Bar State Park
- North Hero
  - Knight Point State Park
  - North Hero State Park
- Shelburne
  - Shelburne Bay
- St. Albans
  - Burton Island State Park
  - Kill Kare State Park

=== Other northern Vermont ===
- Brighton State Park - Island Pond, Brighton
- Crystal Lake State Park - Crystal Lake, Barton
- Elmore State Park - Lake Elmore, Elmore
- Groton State Forest
  - Boulder Beach State Park - Lake Groton, Groton
  - Ricker Pond State Park
  - Stillwater Recreation Area
- Lake Carmi State Park - Lake Carmi, Enosburg Falls
- Maidstone State Park - Maidstone Lake, Maidstone

=== Central Vermont ===
- Bomoseen State Park - Lake Bomoseen
- Branbury State Park - Lake Dunmore
- Camp Plymouth State Park - Echo Lake, Ludlow
- Half Moon Pond State Park
- Lake St. Catherine State Park
- Silver Lake State Park
- Waterbury Center State Park - Waterbury Reservoir in Mount Mansfield State Forest

=== Southern Vermont ===
- Lake Shaftsbury State Park

== See also ==
- List of beaches in the United States
- List of beaches
