= New England hurricane =

The New England hurricane may refer to:

- 1815 New England hurricane
- 1938 New England hurricane
- 1940 New England hurricane
- List of New England hurricanes
