= USS Goldfinch (AM-77) =

Minesweeper of the United States Navy

Coordinates: 45.1669°N 61.4661°W

History

United States, Canada
- Name: Fordham (1930–40); USS Goldfinch (1940–46); Fordham (1946–49); Titus (1949–60); Beater (1960–62)
- Owner: F. J. O'Hara & Sons, Inc (1930–40); United States Navy (1940–46); Christensen Canadian Enterprises (1960–62)
- Operator: F. J. O'Hara & Sons, Inc (1930–40); United States Navy (1940–46); Karlson Shipping (1960–62)
- Port of registry: (United States) Boston, Massachusetts (1930–40); United States Navy (1940–46); (Canada) St. John's (1960–62)
- Builder: Bath Iron Works, Bath, Maine
- Launched: 3 January 1929
- Acquired: 18 September 1940
- Commissioned: 30 January 1941
- Decommissioned: 18 August 1944
- Identification: Pennant number AM-77 (1940–46); Code Letters VOXF (1960–62)
- Fate: Wrecked in Hurricane Daisy, 7 October 1962

General characteristics
- Tonnage: 255 GRT (USS Goldfinch); 269 GRT (Beater)
- Displacement: 455 tons
- Length: 132 ft 4 in (40.34 m)
- Beam: 24 ft (7.32 m)
- Draft: 9 ft 8 in (2.95 m)
- Speed: 10 knots (19 km/h)
- Armament: one 3" gun mount

USS Goldfinch (AM-77) was a minesweeper acquired by the U.S. Navy for the dangerous task of removing mines from minefields laid in the water to prevent ships from passing.

Goldfinch was built as the trawler Fordham in 1930 by Bath Iron Works of Bath, Maine, and purchased by the Navy in 1940. She served until 1944 and was sold into merchant service in 1946, regaining her previous name. Fordham was sold in 1949 and renamed Titus. In 1960, she was sold to Canada and renamed Beater. She was wrecked on 7 October 1962 during Hurricane Daisy.

== Description ==
The ship was 132 feet 4 inches (40.34 m) long, with a beam of 24 feet (7.32 m) and a draft of 9 feet 8 inches (2.95 m). She was powered by a 500BHP diesel engine driving a single screw propeller, which could propel the ship at 10 knots (19 km/h).

== History ==
Fordham was built by Bath Iron Works, Bath, Maine, United States. She was launched on 3 January 1930. The ship was built for F. J. O'Hara & Sons, Inc., Boston, Massachusetts. Fordham was acquired by the United States Navy on 19 September 1940. She was converted to a minesweeper at Bethlehem Atlantic Yard, Boston, and commissioned at Boston Navy Yard 30 January 1941.

=== World War II service ===
Goldfinch was first assigned to Inshore Patrol Force, 1st Naval District, then shifted her operations to Chesapeake Bay, where she conducted minesweeping operations off Norfolk and Yorktown, Virginia. Reporting to Newport, Rhode Island, 1 July, Goldfinch joined Squadron 9 for minesweeping operations ranging from Argentia, Newfoundland, to Norfolk. She became flagship of the Squadron 29 September at Portland, Maine.

Transferred to duty in Newfoundland, Goldfinch based her operations during the period 1 December 1942 to May 1944 at Fort McAndrew and Argentia, Newfoundland, constantly patrolling for mines to protect merchant shipping and warships alike as they plied those waters.

=== Decommissioning ===
She arrived Boston June 1944 for conversion to civilian use as a commercial trawler and decommissioned 18 August 1944. Delivered to the Maritime Commission, Goldfinch was sold 9 January 1946 to the Norwegian Shipping and Trade Commission of New York.

=== Post-war service ===
She reverted to her original name of Fordham. In 1949, she was renamed Titus. In 1962, she was sold to Christensen Canadian Enterprises, renamed Beater, and placed under the management of Karlson Shipping. The Code Letters VOXF were allocated. Her port of registry was St. John's, Newfoundland. Beater was used in the sealing trade. On 7 October 1962, she was wrecked at New Harbour, Nova Scotia, Canada by Hurricane Daisy.
