= Savin Hill (disambiguation) =

Savin Hill is a section of Dorchester, Boston, Massachusetts, United States.

Savin Hill may also refer to:

- Savin Hill Beach, a public beach in Dorchester
- Savin Hill station, a rapid transit station in Dorchester
- Savin Hill (album), a 2003 album by the Street Dogs
