= King Park =

Park in Newport, Rhode Island, United States

Coordinates: 41°28′36″N 71°19′09″W

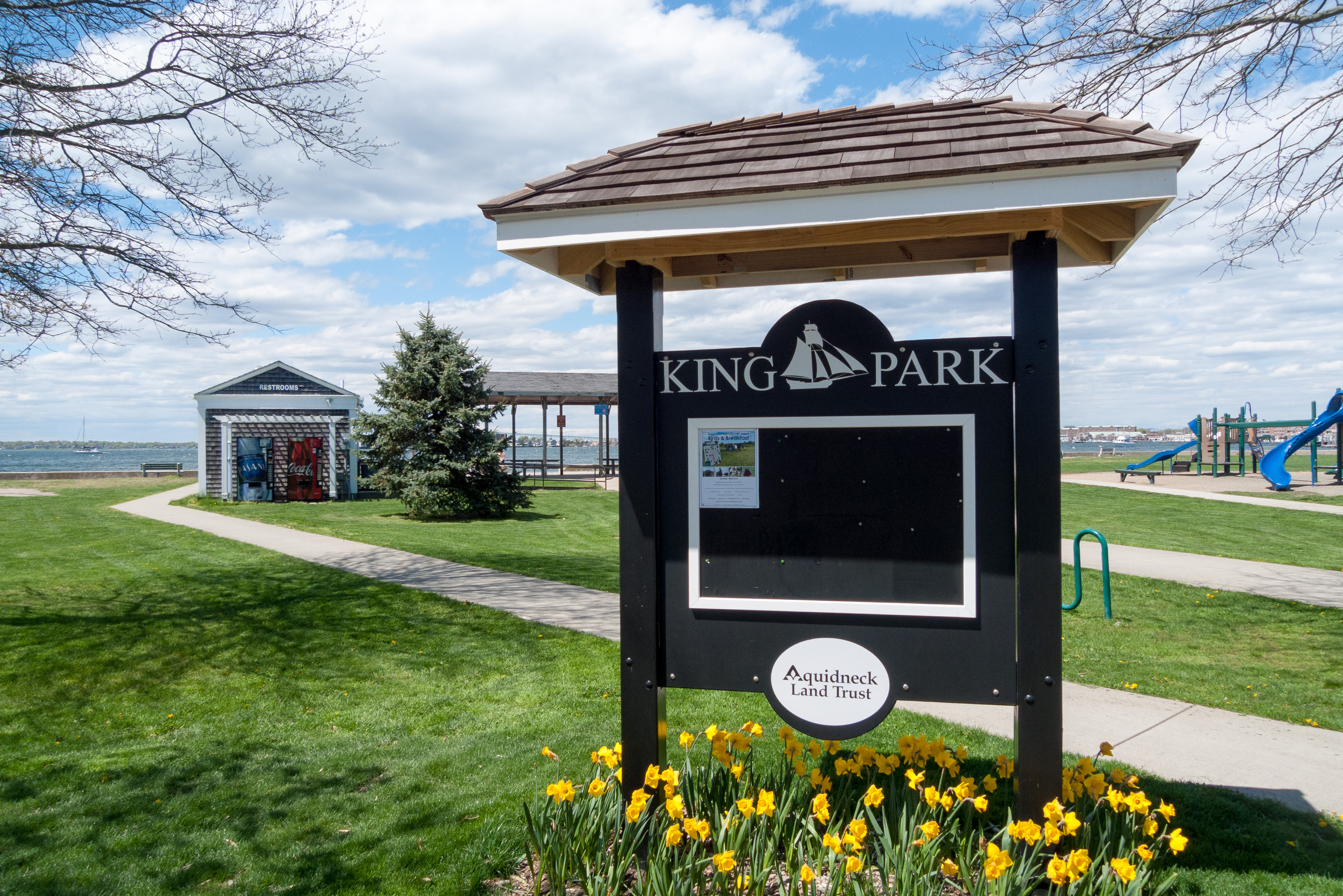
King Park entrance

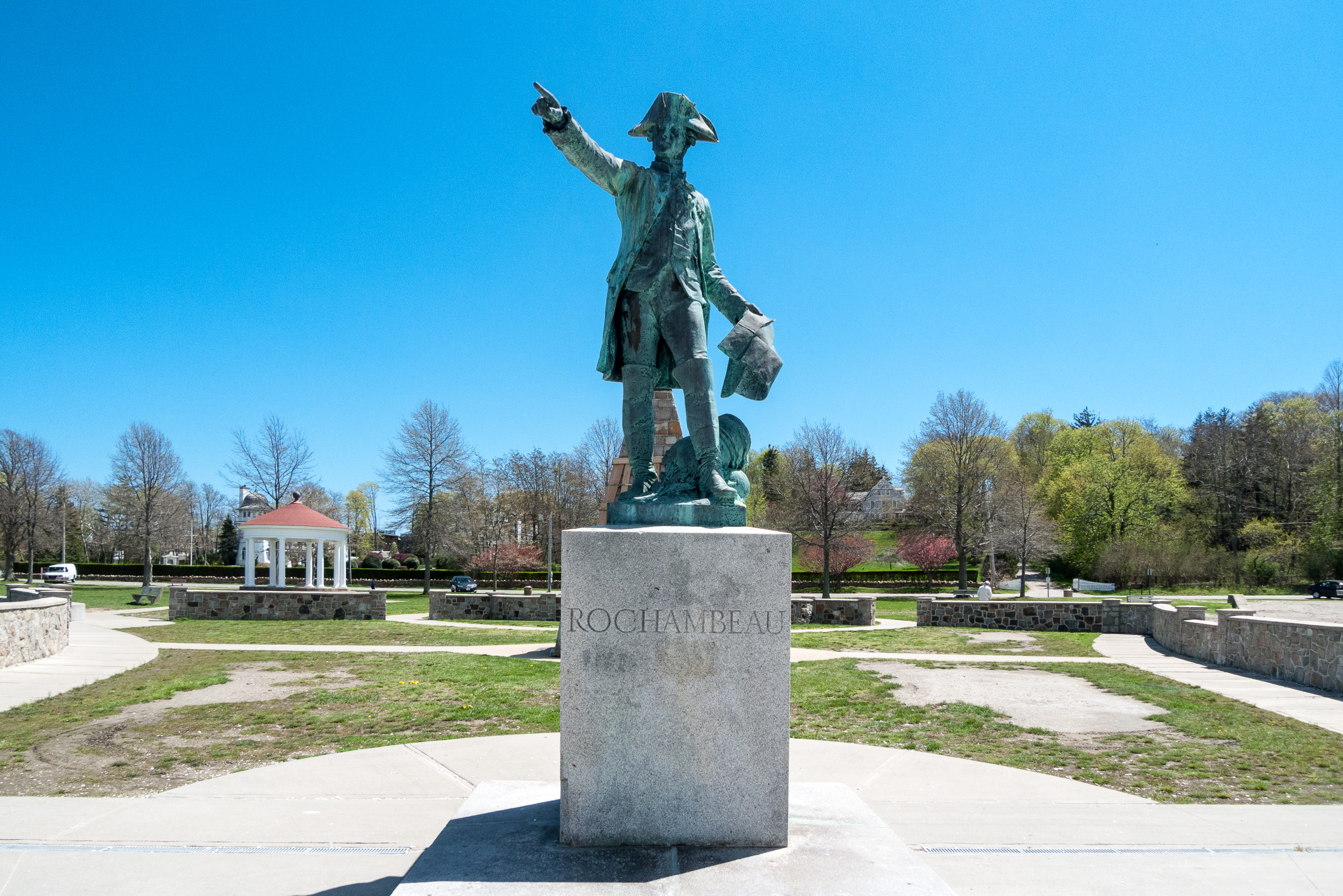
Rochambeau Monument in 2017

King Park is a small historic town park and beach at 125 Wellington Avenue in Newport, Rhode Island. It was the landing site of General Rochambeau during the Revolutionary War, and the park currently features a statue honoring Rochambeau's landing as a well as a beach, playground, dinghy dock, and little league baseball field.

In 1780 General Rochambeau's army of 6,000 French soldiers landed on site of what is now King Park. In 1897 the heirs of Edward King, the builder of the nearby Edward King House, donated the land for the creation of the park. It was built between 1897 and 1902. August A. Noel designed the bath house. In 1928 the Newport Historical Society erected the monument to General Rochambeau's landing. The large stone pier was originally "dock area for the original America's Cup Regattas when they resumed here after WWII. Hurricanes destroyed the wooden finger dock structures and they were never rebuilt." The substantial stone pier is currently the site of one of the town's dinghy docks and is adjacent to a boat launch ramp.
