= Burlingame State Park =

State park in Rhode Island, United States

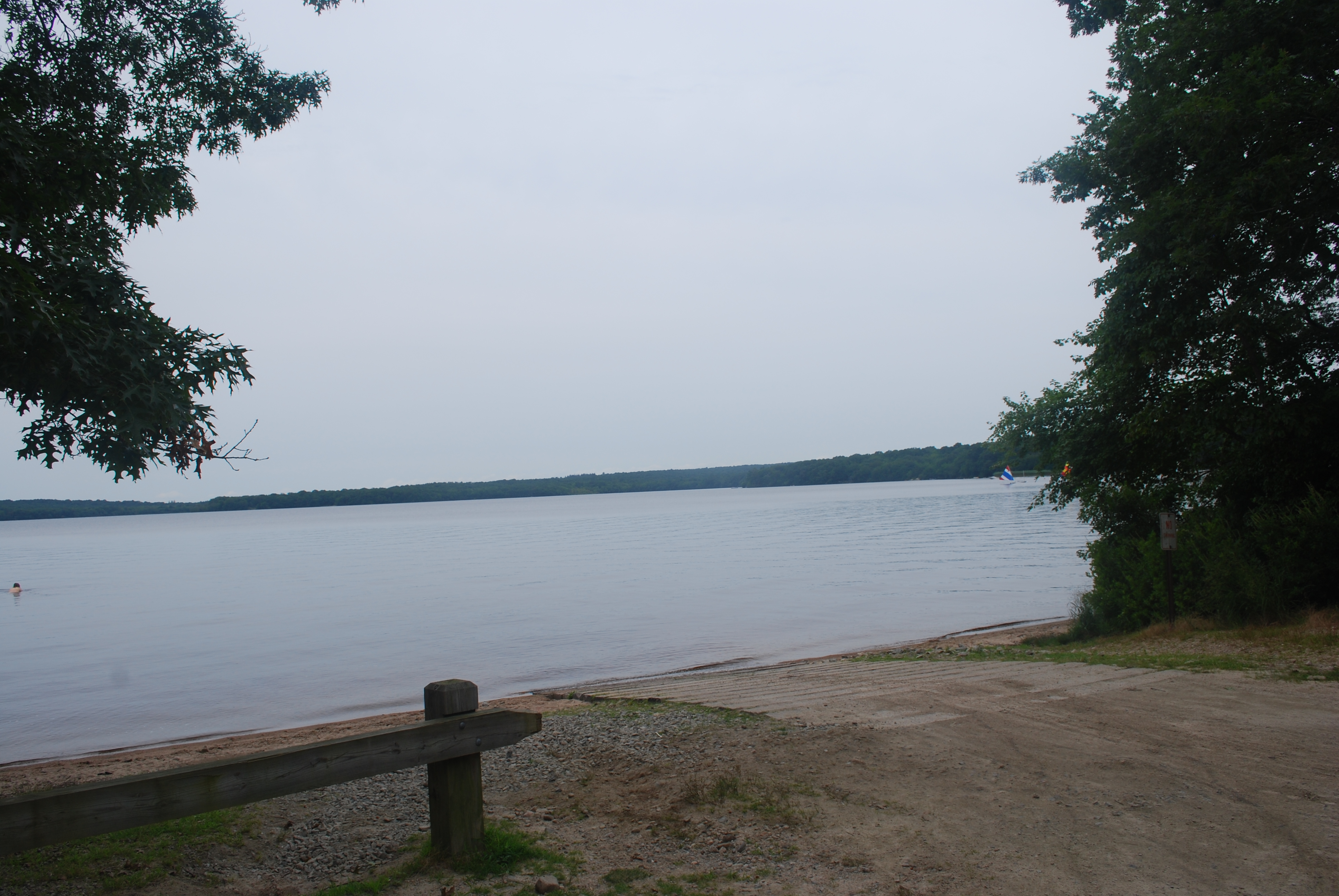
- Watchaug Pond

- Location within Rhode Island
- Interactive map of Burlingame State Park
- Location: Charlestown, Rhode Island, United States
- Coordinates: 41°23′2″N 71°41′28″W
- Area: 3,100 acres (13 km^{2})
- Elevation: 36 ft (11 m)
- Established: 1930
- Named for: Edwin A. Burlingame
- Administrator: Rhode Island Department of Environmental Management Division of Parks & Recreation
- Website: Official website
- Rhode Island State Parks

Burlingame State Park is a public recreation area located in the town of Charlestown, Rhode Island. The state park's 3,100 acres (1,300 ha) offer camping, hiking, and water activities on Watchaug Pond. The park's campground abuts the Burlingame Management Area and Kimball Wildlife Sanctuary.

== History ==
Following the lead of the Audubon Society, which in 1927 had established the Kimball Wildlife Sanctuary, a 29-acre (12 ha) property on the southern shore of Watchaug Pond, the State Parks Commission acquired land around the pond beginning in 1930. The park was named for the commission's longtime chair, Edwin A. Burlingame, and opened as a campground in 1934. During the 1930s, it was the primary base of operations for the Rhode Island activities of the Civilian Conservation Corps. The Audubon Society sold Kimball Wildlife Refuge to the Rhode Island Department of Environmental Management in 2015 and it is now part of the park.

== Natural features ==
Mammals observed at the park include deer, rabbits, muskrat, mink, foxes, otters and weasels. Up to 80 bird species nest in the park, and many more pass through during migration season. Reptiles and amphibians include frogs, salamanders, Eastern box turtles and the non-venomous northern water snake.

== Activities and amenities ==
The park features camping, picnicking, swimming, fishing, and a boat-launch ramp. Hiking trails connect the campground and the Kimball Wildlife Sanctuary. The campground's 3,100 acres (1,300 ha) include 713 campsites (including 20 cabins and one shelter), a camp store, freshwater beach, and canoe rentals. The park's northern area along the Pawcatuck River is used primarily for hunting.
