= List of storms named Daisy =

The name Daisy has been used for six tropical cyclones worldwide: two in the Atlantic Ocean, three in the south-west Indian Ocean, and one in the Australian region of the Indian Ocean.

In the Atlantic:

- Hurricane Daisy (1958), remained far enough offshore to not cause any damage
- Hurricane Daisy (1962), damage over $1.1 million (1962 USD) in New England and the Canadian Maritimes

The name, Daisy was dropped in the Atlantic basin following the 1962 season, and was replaced by Dorothy for the 1966 season.

In the Southwest Indian:

- Cyclone Daisy (1962), struck Madagascar
- Cyclone Daisy (1965), re-designated from Cyclone Carol upon crossing from the Australian region.
- Cyclone Daisy (1994), struck Madagascar

In the Australian region:

- Cyclone Daisy (1972), caused some flooding near Brisbane
