= Elmore State Park =

State park in Lamoille County, Vermont

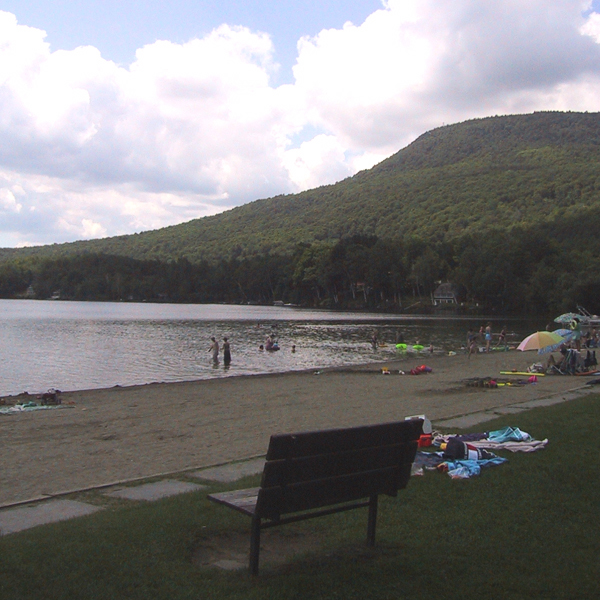
- The beach at Elmore State Park, with Elmore Mountain in the background

- Location within Vermont
- Interactive map of Elmore State Park
- Location: Elmore, Vermont, United States
- Coordinates: 44°32′40″N 72°31′40″W
- Area: 939.63 acres (380.25 ha)
- Established: 1936
- Administrator: Vermont Department of Forests, Parks, and Recreation
- Open: Friday of Memorial Day weekend through the second Monday in October
- Website: Official website
- Vermont State Parks
- Elmore State Park
- U.S. National Register of Historic Places
- U.S. Historic district
- Built: 1934
- Built by: CCC
- Architectural style: CCC State Park
- MPS: Historic Park Landscapes in National and State Parks MPS
- NRHP reference No.: 02000279
- Added to NRHP: March 29, 2002

Elmore State Park is a state park located in Elmore, Vermont, United States. It includes Lake Elmore and Elmore Mountain, and has day-use facilities for picnicking, hiking, and water-based activities, and a 59-site campground. Some of its facilities were developed in the 1930s by the Civilian Conservation Corps; for these, it was listed on the National Register of Historic Places in 2002. The park is open seasonally between Memorial Day and Columbus Day; fees are charged for day use and camping.

== History ==
In 1934, the town of Elmore and several of its residents gave the state of Vermont a gift of 30 acres (12 ha). This occurred during the Great Depression, and the state set the Civilian Conservation Corps to work transforming the gift of land, along with adjacent federal lands, into a park. CCC crews, whose encampment remains are also found in the area, built the main access road, the beach house and the beach between 1934 and 1936. The federal portion of the park was turned over to the state in 1938, which built the observation tower atop Elmore Mountain the following year. The campground was added in 1963.

== Features ==
Elmore State Park is located in northern Elmore, a rural community in southern Lamoille County, Vermont. The park covers 755 acres (306 ha), set between Lake Elmore and the summit of 2,608-foot (795 m) Elmore Mountain. Its developed area is located at the northern end of the lake, where Beach Road runs west from Vermont Route 12. The campground facilities, located north of the beach include 44 tent/RV sites and 15 lean-tos, two restrooms with hot showers, and a sanitary dump station. The day-use area features a sandy beach, with a CCC-built beach house which includes a community room, a concession stand and cafe, restrooms and boat rentals. The park has easy access to hiking trails on Elmore Mountain, which lead to the observation tower at its summit.

== See also ==
- National Register of Historic Places listings in Lamoille County, Vermont
