= Elmore, Vermont =

- Town
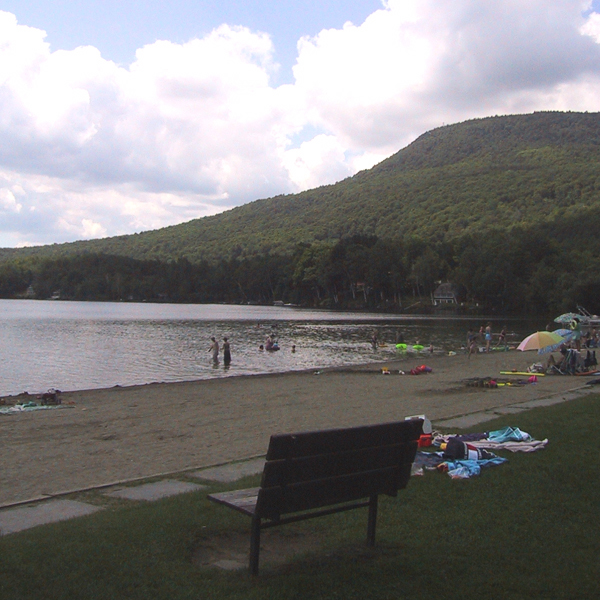
- Along Lake Elmore in the town of Elmore

- Logo

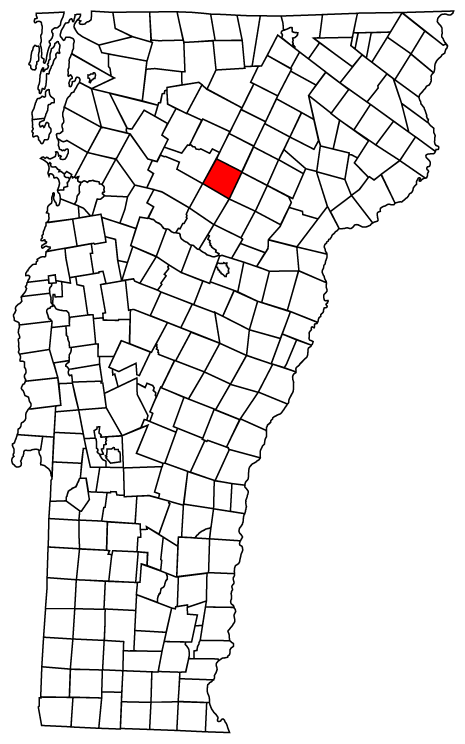
- Elmore, Vermont
- Coordinates: 44°30′22″N 72°30′39″W
- Country: United States
- State: Vermont
- County: Lamoille
- Communities: East Elmore; Lake Elmore

Area
  - Total: 39.7 sq mi (102.7 km^{2})
  - Land: 39.1 sq mi (101.3 km^{2})
  - Water: 0.54 sq mi (1.4 km^{2})
- Elevation: 1,690 ft (520 m)

Population (2020)
  - Total: 886
  - Density: 23/sq mi (8.7/km^{2})
- Time zone: UTC-5 (Eastern (EST))
  - Summer (DST): UTC-4 (EDT)
- ZIP Codes: 05657 (Lake Elmore); 05661 (Morrisville); 05680 (Wolcott)
- Area code: 802
- FIPS code: 50-23725
- GNIS feature ID: 1462089
- Website: www.elmorevt.org

Elmore is a town in Lamoille County, Vermont, United States. It was granted by the Vermont Republic in 1780, and was named for Colonel Samuel Elmore (1720–1805), one of the original grantees. The population was 886 at the 2020 census. Elmore contains the villages of East Elmore and Lake Elmore, as well as Elmore State Park, a 700-acre (2.8 km^{2}) recreational area on the 219-acre (0.9 km^{2}) Lake Elmore and on Elmore Mountain to the west.

== Geography ==
Elmore is in southeastern Lamoille County, bordered to the south and east by Washington County. A small portion of the town border on the east is with Caledonia County. According to the United States Census Bureau, the town has a total area of 39.7 square miles (102.7 km^{2}), of which 39.1 square miles (101.3 km^{2}) are land and 0.54 square miles (1.4 km^{2}), or 1.38%, are water. Lake Elmore is in the northwest corner of the town, and drains north via Elmore Pond Brook toward the Lamoille River. Elmore village sits at the northern end of the lake. The Worcester Mountains are on the western side of the town. Mt. Elmore, at the northern end of the range, rises to an elevation of 2,608 feet (795 m) to the west of Lake Elmore.

Vermont Route 12 crosses the town, passing through Elmore village and along the east side of Lake Elmore. The highway leads northwest 5 miles (8 km) to Morrisville and south 21 miles (34 km) to Montpelier, the state capital.

== Demographics ==
Historical population
| Census | Pop. | Note | %± |
|---|---|---|---|
| 1790 | 12 | | — |
| 1800 | 45 | | 275.0% |
| 1810 | 157 | | 248.9% |
| 1820 | 157 | | 0.0% |
| 1830 | 442 | | 181.5% |
| 1840 | 476 | | 7.7% |
| 1850 | 504 | | 5.9% |
| 1860 | 602 | | 19.4% |
| 1870 | 637 | | 5.8% |
| 1880 | 682 | | 7.1% |
| 1890 | 593 | | −13.0% |
| 1900 | 550 | | −7.3% |
| 1910 | 553 | | 0.5% |
| 1920 | 468 | | −15.4% |
| 1930 | 382 | | −18.4% |
| 1940 | 300 | | −21.5% |
| 1950 | 312 | | 4.0% |
| 1960 | 237 | | −24.0% |
| 1970 | 292 | | 23.2% |
| 1980 | 421 | | 44.2% |
| 1990 | 573 | | 36.1% |
| 2000 | 849 | | 48.2% |
| 2010 | 855 | | 0.7% |
| 2020 | 886 | | 3.6% |
U.S. Decennial Census

As of the 2000 census, there were 849 people, 306 households, and 223 families residing in the town. The population density was 21.7 people per square mile (8.4/km^{2}). There were 458 housing units at an average density of 11.7 per square mile (4.5/km^{2}). The racial makeup of the town was 98.35% White, 0.12% Native American, 0.35% Asian, 0.12% from other races, and 1.06% from two or more races. Hispanic or Latino of any race were 0.47% of the population.

There were 306 households, out of which 42.8% had children under the age of 18 living with them, 61.4% were married couples living together, 6.2% had a female householder with no husband present, and 26.8% were non-families. 18.0% of all households were made up of individuals, and 5.6% had someone living alone who was 65 years of age or older. The average household size was 2.77 and the average family size was 3.20.

In the town, the population was spread out, with 29.8% under the age of 18, 5.5% from 18 to 24, 32.4% from 25 to 44, 23.8% from 45 to 64, and 8.5% who were 65 years of age or older. The median age was 37 years. For every 100 females, there were 97.9 males. For every 100 females age 18 and over, there were 98.0 males.

The median income for a household in the town was $45,357, and the median income for a family was $48,214. Males had a median income of $31,250 versus $27,361 for females. The per capita income for the town was $20,069. About 6.4% of families and 6.3% of the population were below the poverty line, including 6.0% of those under age 18 and 2.8% of those age 65 or over.

== Notable people ==
- George W. Bailey Jr., Secretary of State of Vermont, born in Elmore

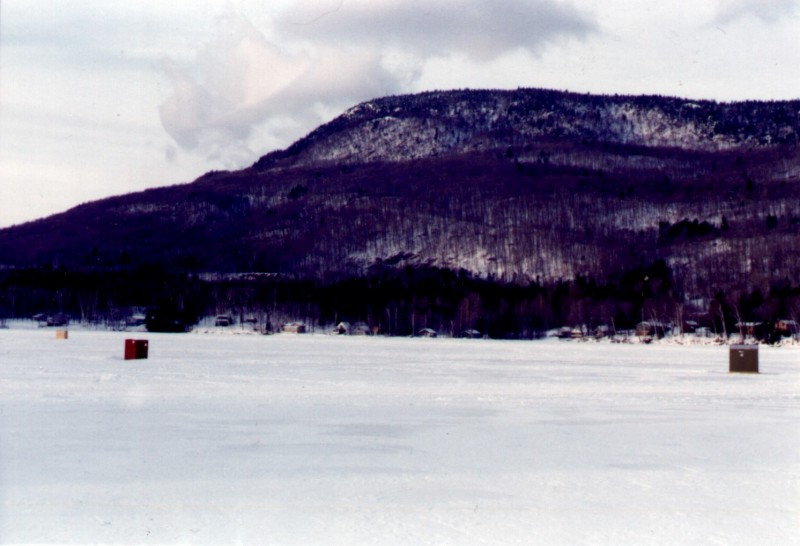
Ice fishing shanties on Lake Elmore, with Elmore Mountain rising behind
