= Belle Isle Marsh Reservation =

Reservation in East Boston, Massachusetts, U.S.

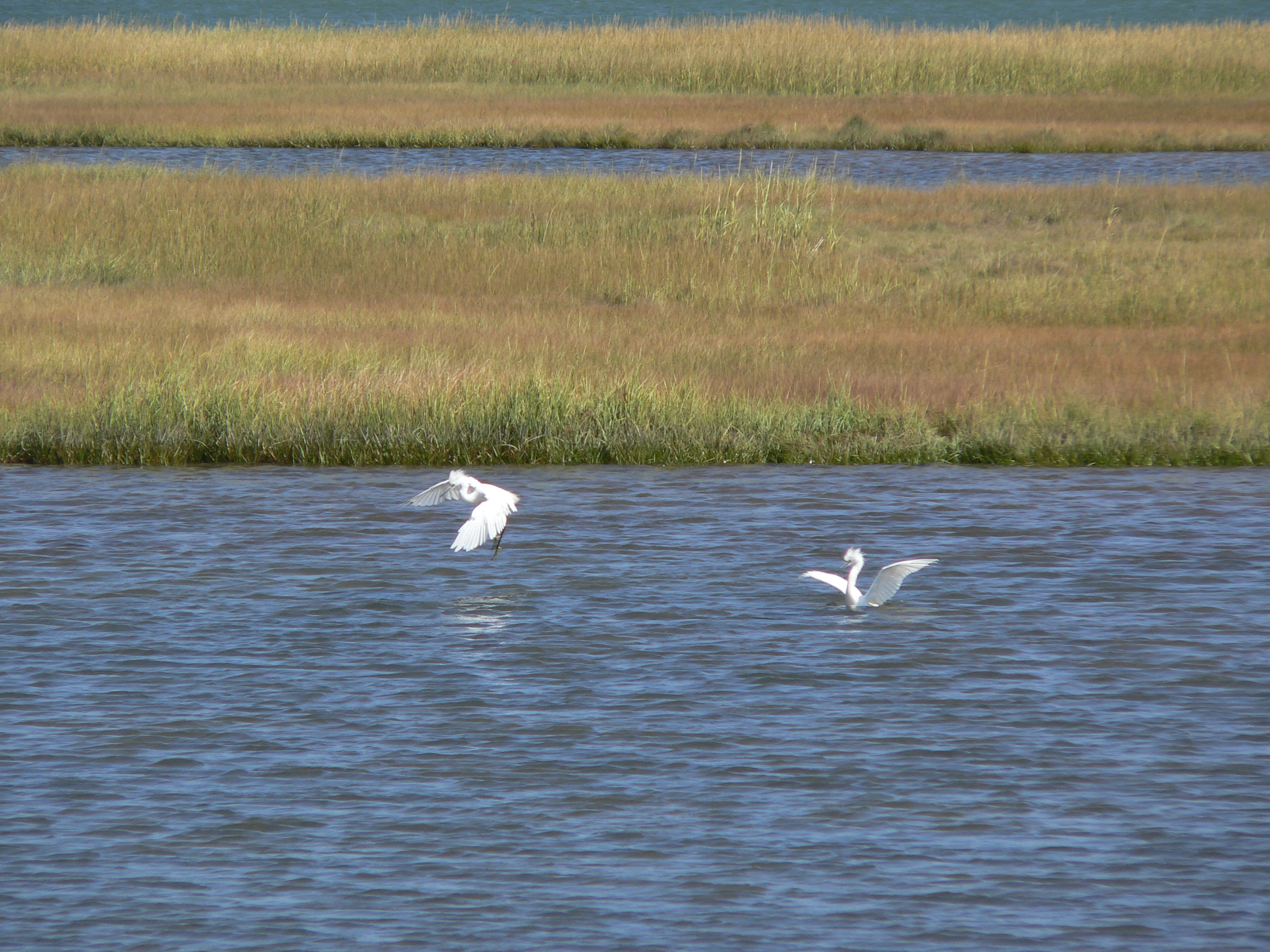
- Egrets in the marsh

- Location within Greater Boston area Location within Massachusetts Location within the United States
- Location: East Boston, Winthrop and Revere, Massachusetts, United States
- Coordinates: 42°23′21″N 70°59′21″W
- Area: 188 acres (76 ha)
- Elevation: 0 ft (0 m)
- Established: 1985
- Administrator: Massachusetts Department of Conservation and Recreation
- Website: Official website

Belle Isle Marsh Reservation in East Boston, Suffolk County, Massachusetts, is an urban nature preserve and public recreation area containing mostly coastal wetlands. The 350-acre (1.4 km^{2}) Reservation includes the largest remaining salt marsh in the Boston area. The marsh also borders the towns of Revere and Winthrop.

It was once a Metropolitan District Commission reservation, but it is now run by the Massachusetts Department of Conservation and Recreation. It is a reserve for a variety of flora and fauna. Salt marshes were once prevalent along the Massachusetts Bay shoreline. The marsh is home to a wide variety of saltmarsh plants, marine life, and birds. The reservation is managed by the Department of Conservation and Recreation.

== History ==
Although it is now connected to the mainland, Belle Isle was formerly an actual island. It was granted in 1628 to William Brereton, who named it Susana Island in honor of his daughter. It was later referred to as Hog Island or Hogg Island on maps, before it was purchased by Joseph Russel near the end of the 18th century, who named it Belle Isle. In 1800, it was purchased by John Breed, who lived on the island, which was then referred to as Breed's Island. Part of the island is now developed as Orient Heights; much of the remainder is Belle Isle Marsh.

== Activities and amenities ==
Features of the reservation include landscaped hiking paths, benches, an observation tower, and handicap access. A portion of the Boston Harborwalk runs through the reservation.

== Gallery ==
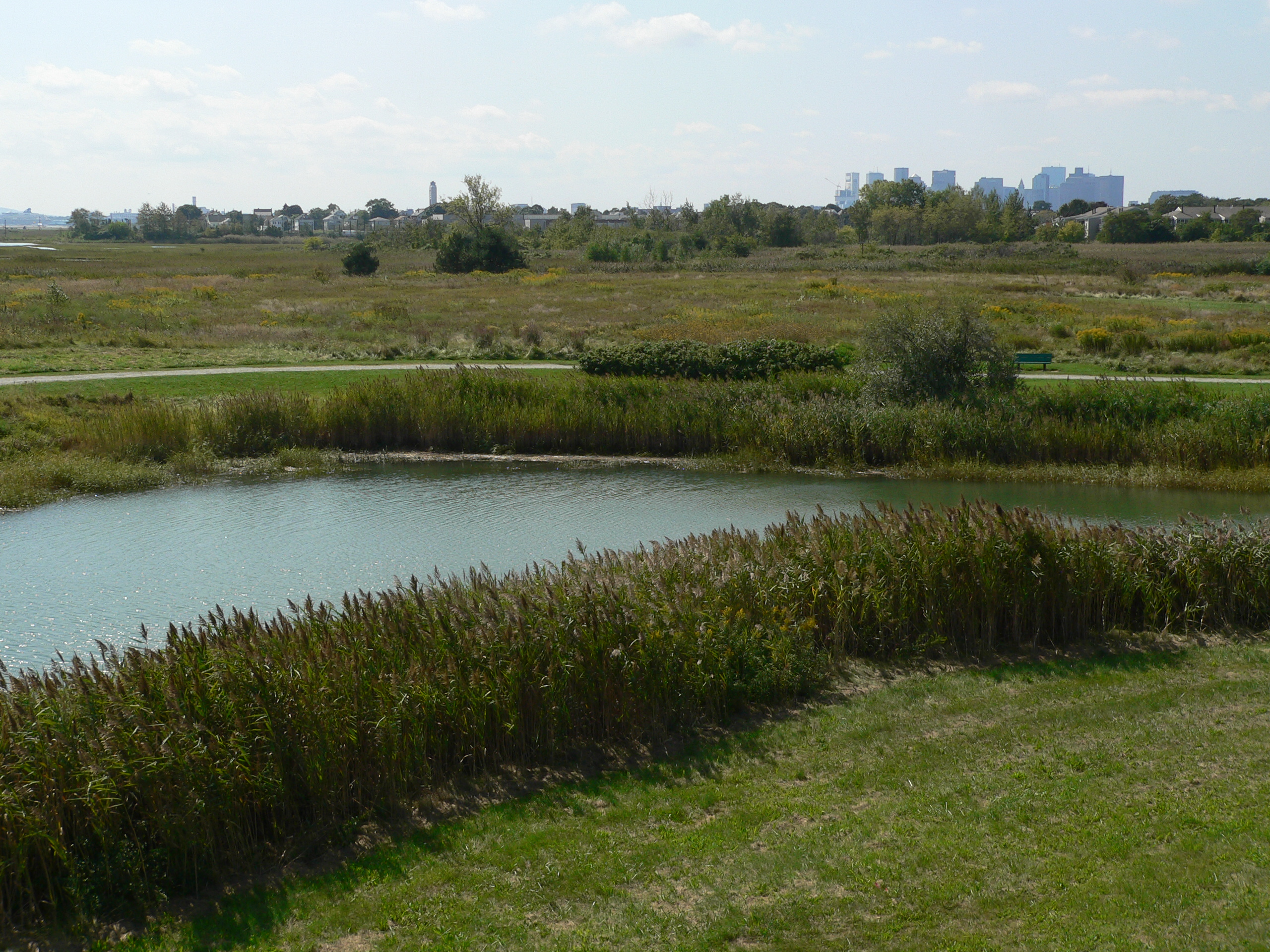
Marsh with Boston skyline in the distance

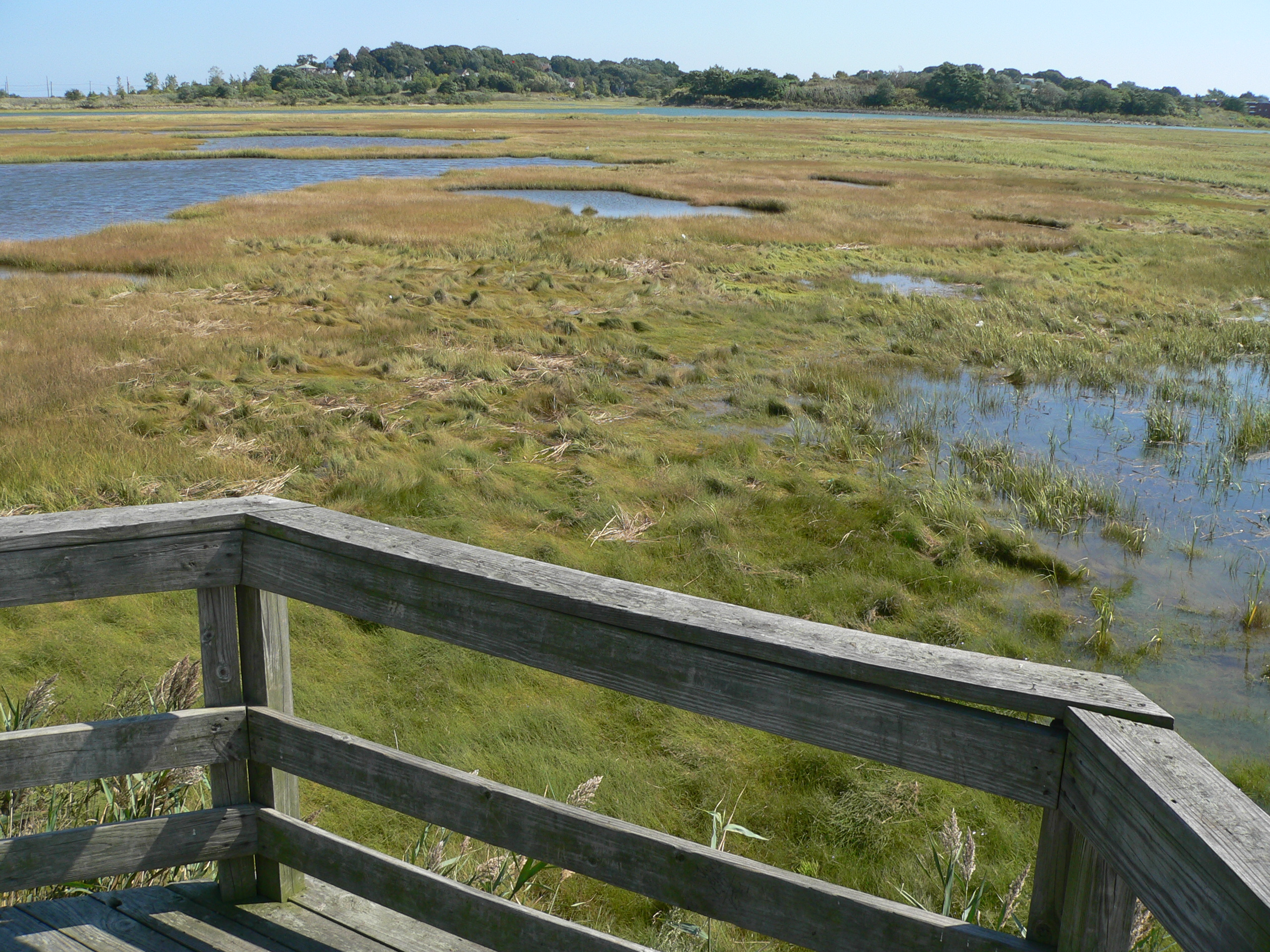
From the observation tower

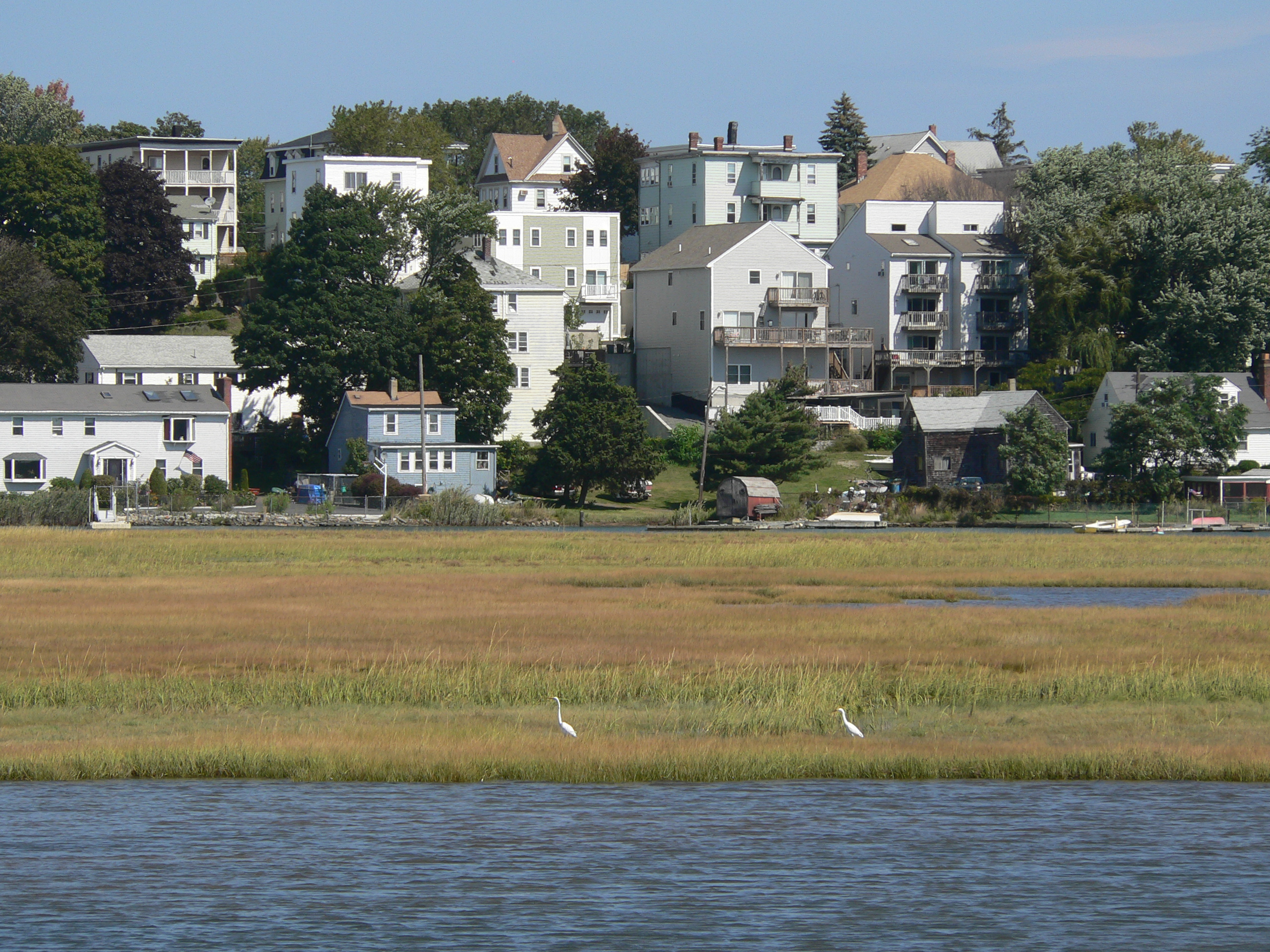
Adjacent homes in Revere
