= Rochambeau Monument (Newport, Rhode Island) =

Rochambeau Monument & Statue (Newport, RI)
- United States
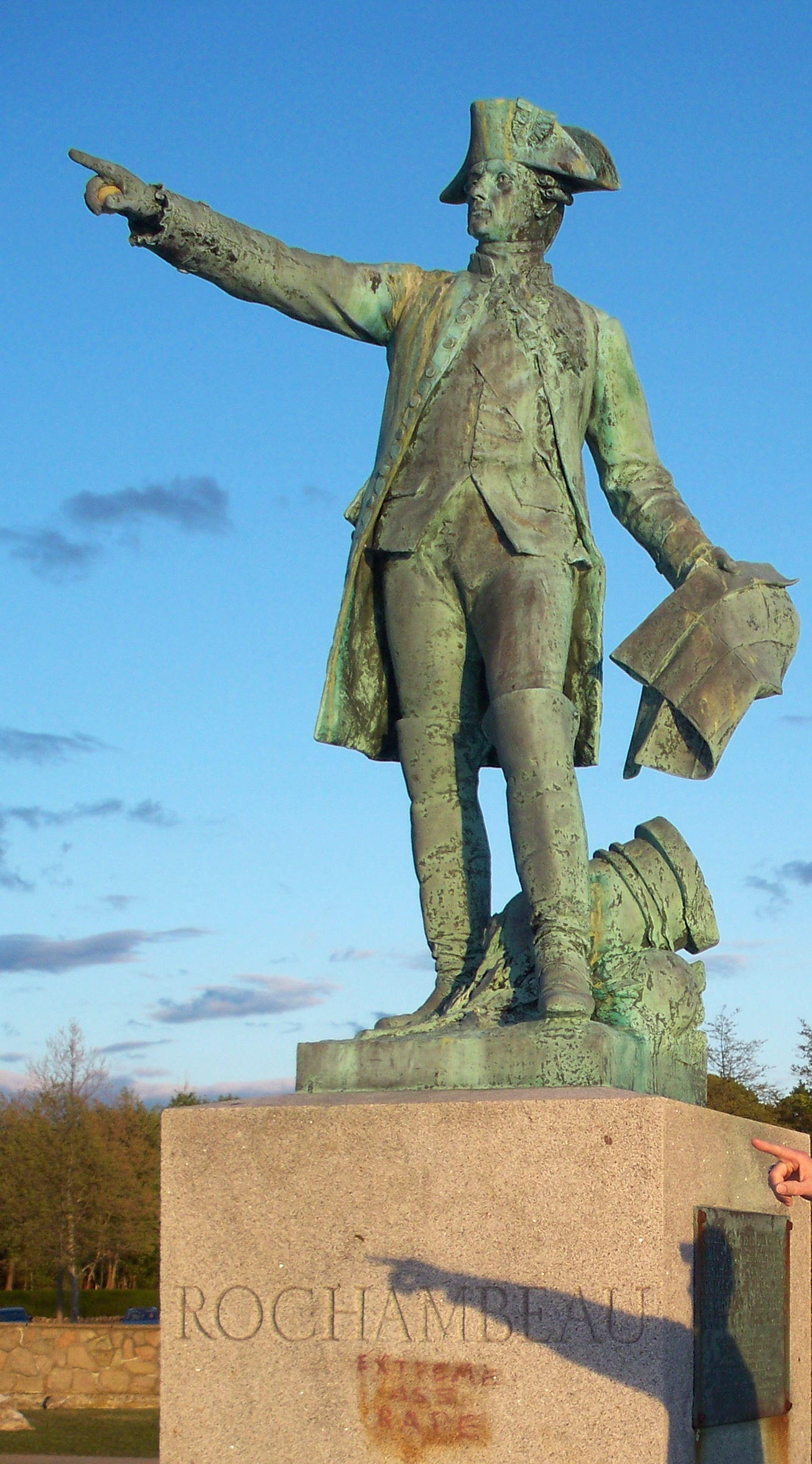
- Rochambeau Monument in King Park
- For Jean-Baptiste Donatien de Vimeur, comte de Rochambeau
- Unveiled: 1934
- Location: 41.476885°N 71.321664°W near Newport, RI
- Rochambeau

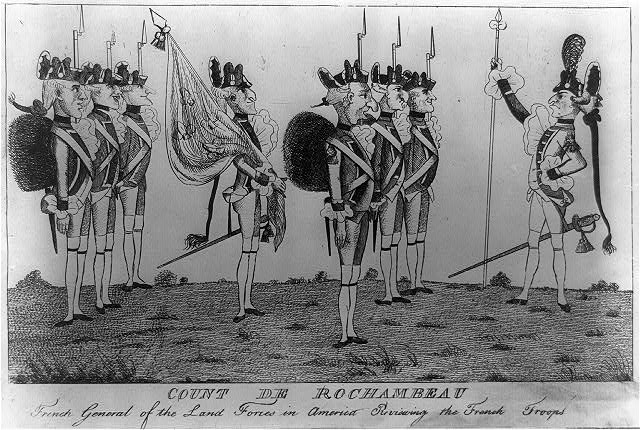
Cartoon anonymous American in 1780 on the Count de Rochambeau during a parade of French troops at Newport

Rochambeau Statue and Memorial is a monument to French nobleman and General Jean-Baptiste Donatien de Vimeur, comte de Rochambeau, who was a key commander of the French forces who assisted the Continental Army during the American Revolutionary War. The monument is located on the waterfront in King Park, along the southern edge of Newport Harbor, near Brenton Cove and Fort Adams state park and was erected in 1934. This is the 3rd replica of the Rochambeau Statue in Lafayette Park, Washington DC, which was created by renowned French sculptor Fernand Harmar. It was donated by A. Kingsley Macomber. The statue was restored in 2019 by the fundraising efforts of members of the Alliance Française of Newport.

== See also ==
- 1934 in art
