= Lake Elmore =

Lake in Vermont, United States

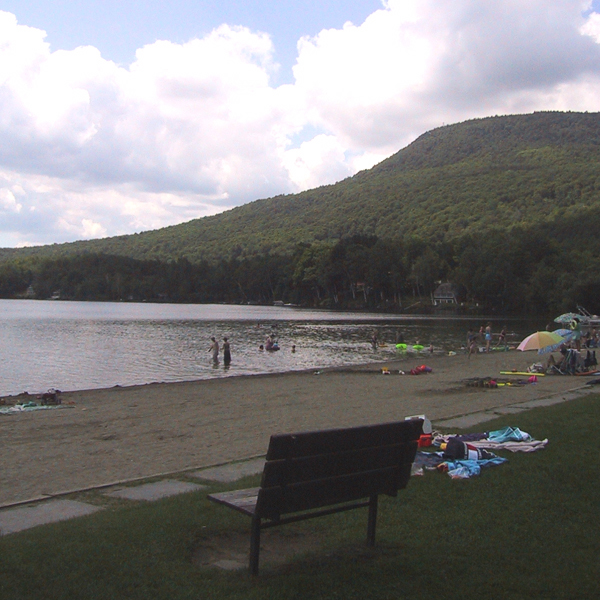

- Location within Vermont
- Location: Elmore, Lamoille County, Vermont
- Coordinates: 44°32′31″N 72°31′30″W
- Primary outflows: Elmore Pond Brook
- Basin countries: United States
- Surface area: 216 acres (87 ha)
- Surface elevation: 1,138 ft (347 m)

Lake Elmore is a 219-acre (0.89 km^{2}) lake located in and named after Elmore, Vermont. The lake is located northwest of Elmore, and it drains into the Lamoille River through Elmore Pond Brook at the northern end.

Recently, the lake has had a problem with milfoil, and there are several fundraisers every year to help the Milfoil Foundation, which then uses the money to pay for the milfoil's extraction.

The park had its beginning in 1936 when the town of Elmore and local citizens made a gift of 30 acres on Lake Elmore to the state of Vermont. With modest means, a picnic and beach area were created. Today, with more than 700 acres, Elmore State Park has become a popular, developed recreation facility.

According to the Vermont Department of Forests, Parks, and Recreation, the town calls itself "The Beauty Spot of Vermont."
