= Barrington Beach =

Beach in Rhode Island, United States

Coordinates: 41°43′20″N 71°18′32″W

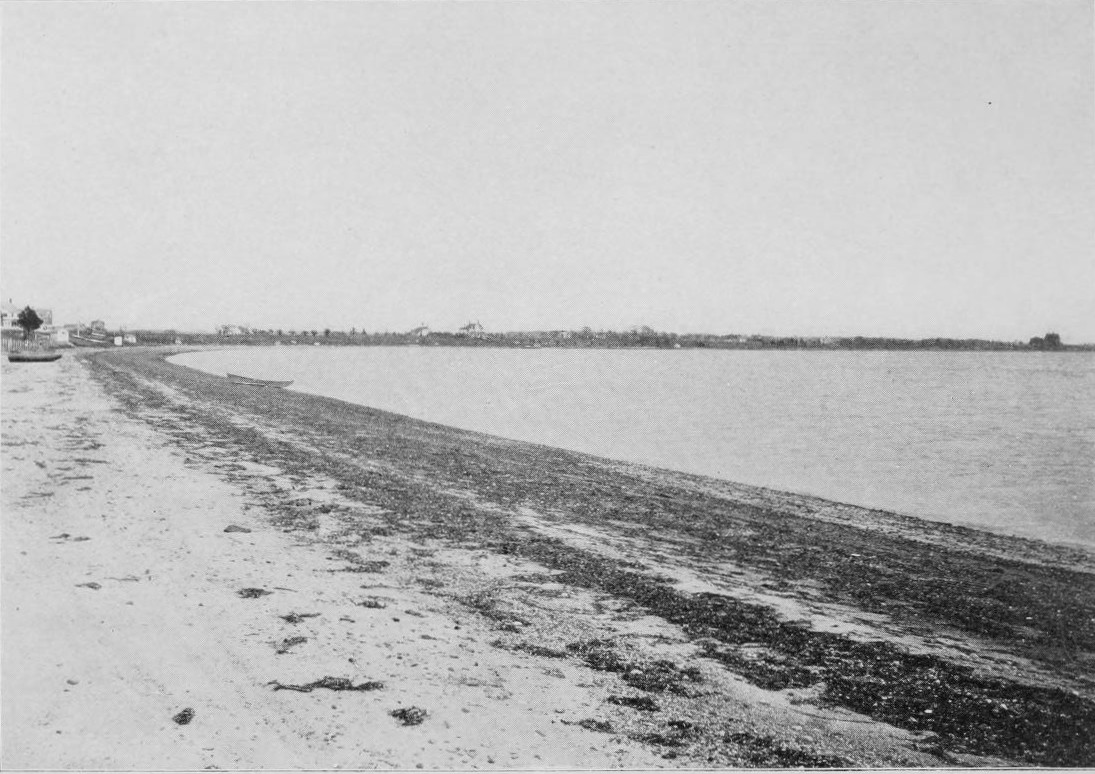
History of Barrington, Rhode Island - View of Town Beach and

Barrington Beach is a beach located in Barrington, Rhode Island, United States. It has 4 acres (1.6 ha) of beachfront overlooking Narragansett Bay. The length of the shore is 700 feet (210 m). It is located in the East Bay region of Rhode Island, and is adjacent to the Rhode Island Country Club. It is considered a barrier spit. The beach has long been used for clam digging.

Construction to address issues of pollution, storm damage, and rising sea levels began in October 2013. The Rhode Island Department of Health has recommended closing the beach due to bacterial levels frequently, including in July 2011, with a recommended reopening a day later; and in July 2024.
