= Roy Carpenter's Beach =

Beach in Rhode Island, United States

Coordinates: 41.372646°N 71.560631°W

Roy Carpenter's Beach is a private beach in the town of South Kingstown, Rhode Island. It is located near the village of Matunuck on Route 1 at the Matunuck Beach Road exit, near the Theatre by the Sea.
