= Watchaug Pond =

Kettle pond (lake) in southern Rhode Island

Watchaug pond
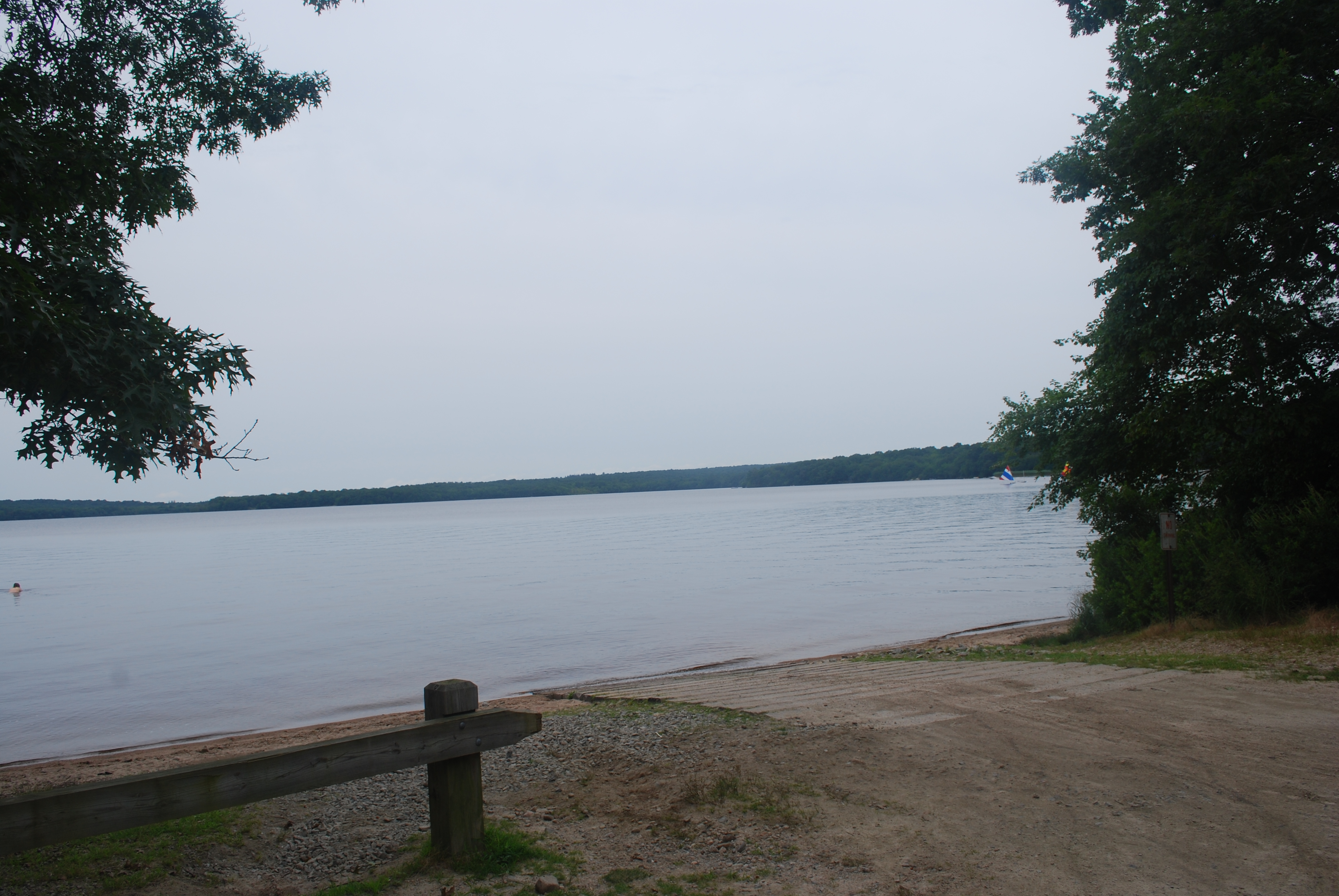

- Location within Rhode Island
- Location: Washington County, Rhode Island
- Coordinates: 41°23′00″N 71°41′23″W
- Type: kettle pond
- Basin countries: United States
- Surface area: 573 acres (2.32 km^{2})
- Average depth: 8 ft (2.4 m)
- Max. depth: 36 ft (11 m)
- Surface elevation: 36 ft (11 m)

Watchaug Pond is a kettle pond (lake) located in southern Rhode Island, in the town of Charlestown. It is surrounded by the John Vincent Gormley 8-mile loop trail which was dedicated by Senator Jack Reed in 1999. The Vin Gormley trail is the second to last leg of the North-South Trail that transects the state. In addition it is near the Audubon Society's Kimball Wildlife Refuge. The 573-acre (2.32 km^{2}) pond is within 3,000 acres (12 km^{2}) of public land. There is a public cement boat ramp on Sanctuary Road. The Kettle Pond Visitor Center, operated by U.S. Fish and Wildlife Service and the Rhode Island National Wildlife Refuge, hosts school field trips and educational programs about the pond's flora, fauna and habitats.
