= Savin Hill Beach =

Public beach in Boston, Massachusetts, United States

Coordinates: 42°18′28.6″N 71°3′3.1″W

Savin Hill Beach is a public beach in the Dorchester neighborhood of Boston, Massachusetts. It is proximate to Malibu Beach.

The closest subway stop is Savin Hill on the MBTA Red Line.
