= Winthrop Parkway =

Parkway in Revere, Massachusetts

- Winthrop Parkway, Metropolitan Parkway System of Greater Boston
- U.S. National Register of Historic Places
- U.S. Historic district
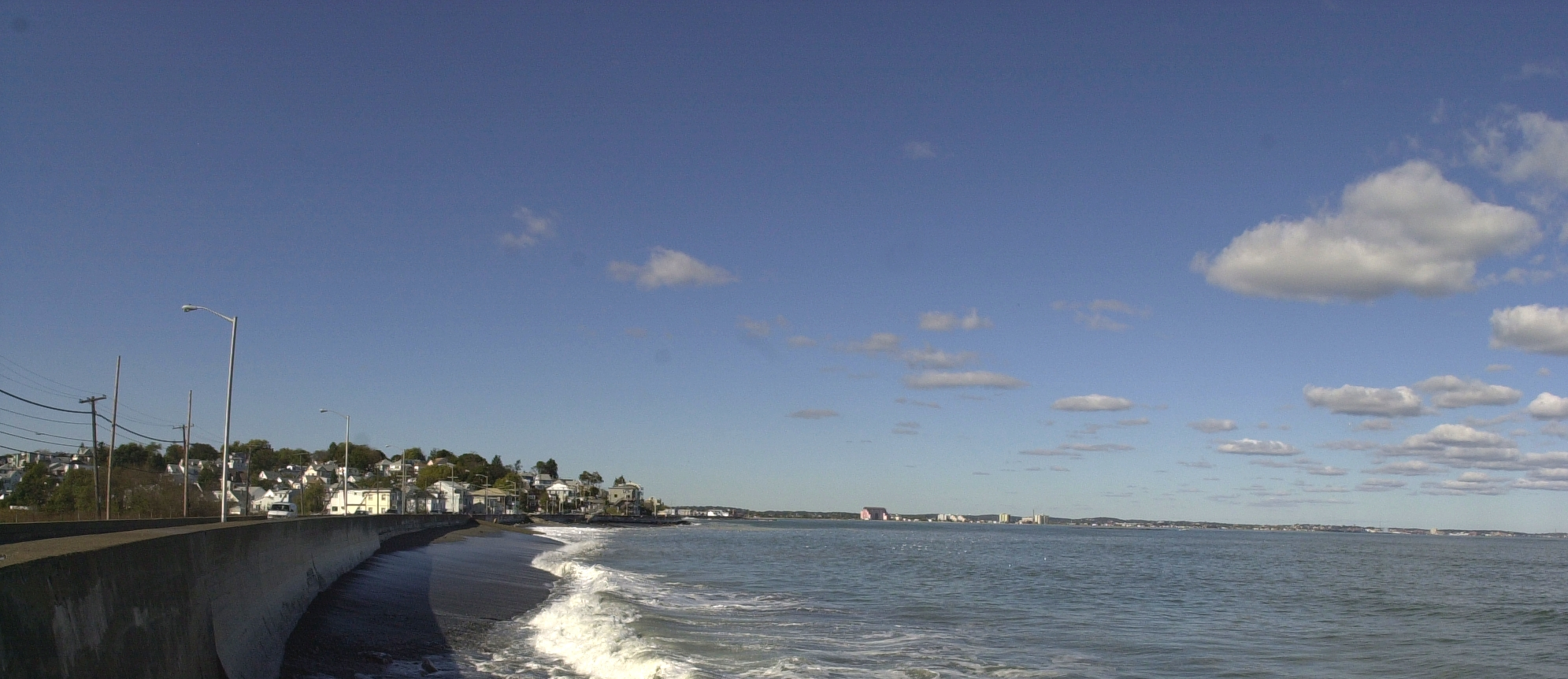

- Location within Massachusetts Location within the United States
- Location: Winthrop Parkway, Revere, Massachusetts
- Coordinates: 42°23′29″N 70°58′52″W
- Area: 3.5 acres (1.4 ha)
- Built: 1909
- Architect: Eliot, Charles; Olmsted Brothers
- MPS: Metropolitan Park System of Greater Boston MPS
- NRHP reference No.: 03001471
- Added to NRHP: January 21, 2004

Winthrop Parkway is a historic parkway in Revere, Massachusetts. The parkway, built between 1909 and 1919 and now designated as part of Route 145, runs for about 0.75 miles (1.21 km), from Eliot Circle (the junction with the Revere Beach Parkway and Revere Beach Boulevard) southeast to the Revere-Winthrop line. Acquisitions for its construction represent the last public purchase of oceanfront lands in Revere. It was listed on the National Register of Historic Places in 2004.

== History ==
Winthrop Parkway was one of several parkways proposed in the coastal area north of Boston, Massachusetts in 1895. Although plans were drafted for it a few years later by the Metropolitan Parks Commission (MPC, predecessor to the Metropolitan District Commission), these plans were shelved while the commission focused on the construction of Winthrop Shore Drive and Revere Beach Parkway. Its development was also complicated by the need to develop a complete new right of way, whereas the other two parkways were built largely on existing alignments.

In 1905 the Boston, Revere Beach and Lynn Railroad gave a stretch of right of way to the MPC between Eliot Circle, terminus of the Revere Beach Parkway, and Leverett Street. This part of the road was built in 1909, cutting through the Beachmont neighborhood of Revere. With the original plan to build to roadway all the way to Winthrop Beach, the MPC in 1914 proposed to lengthen the parkway to the city line. Land acquisition and construction followed, and that section of the road, which runs along the coast, was completed by 1919. The MPC then built the adjacent seawall. Discussions to further extend the parkway never resulted in further development.

The roadway was widened in 1946, apparently to facilitate parking. Some time before then, tidal gates were added on either side of the parkway near Leverett Street to regulate the passage of water in and out of Belle Isle Marsh.

== See also ==
- National Register of Historic Places listings in Suffolk County, Massachusetts
