= 2012 Harvard cheating scandal =

American academic scandal

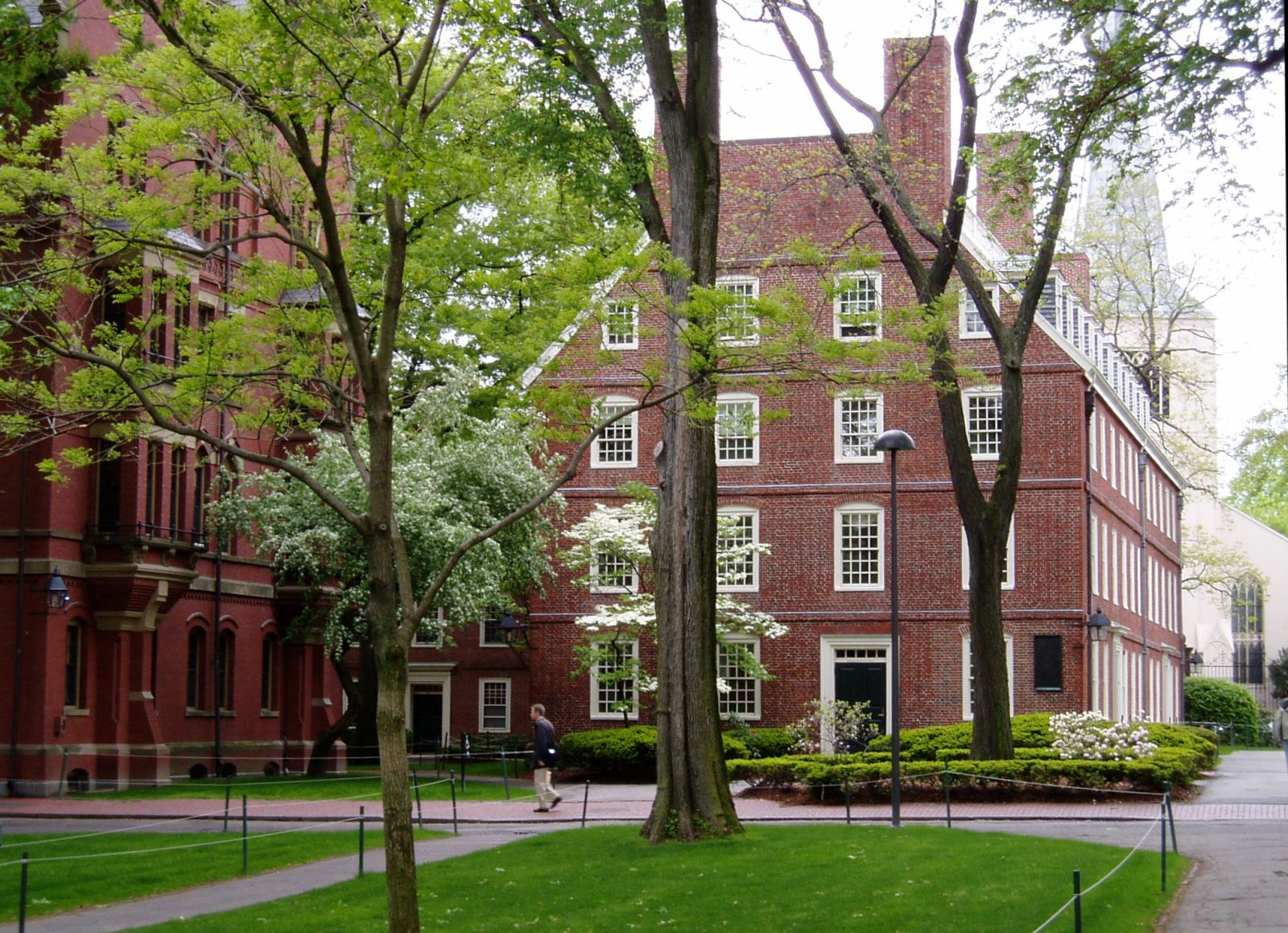
Harvard University's Massachusetts Hall

The 2012 Harvard cheating scandal involved approximately 125 Harvard University students who were investigated for cheating on the take-home final examination of the spring 2012 edition of Government 1310: "Introduction to Congress". Harvard announced the investigation publicly on August 30, 2012. Dean of Undergraduate Education Jay M. Harris described the case as "unprecedented in its scope and magnitude". The Harvard Crimson ranked the scandal as the news story most important to Harvard in 2012.

A teaching fellow noticed similarities between a small number of exams during grading in May 2012. The course's professor brought the case to the Harvard College Administrative Board, which reviewed all final exams, leading to individual cases against nearly half of the 279 students enrolled in the class, almost two percent of the undergraduate student body. The administrative board completed its investigation in December 2012. On February 1, 2013 Harvard revealed that "somewhat more than half" of the investigated students, estimated at 70%, were forced to withdraw.

Government 1310: "Introduction to Congress" was led by assistant professor Matthew B. Platt in Spring 2010, 2011, and 2012. The course was offered to students of Harvard College and Harvard Extension School. It developed a reputation as an easy course, receiving a high proportion of "easy" or "very easy" ratings in the Q Guide, Harvard's collection of course evaluations. According to some Spring 2012 students, Platt immediately confirmed this reputation by promising 120 A's and stating that attendance was optional. Students who attended could share their notes.

Grades were determined by four take-home exams. In 2010 and 2011, the take-home exams were essays, but in 2012 they were changed to a short answer format. The change corresponded with a spike in difficulty and a drop in overall score, according to the Q Guide. Students said the short answer format facilitated collaboration. Some guessed that the changes were forced from above.

== Spring 2012 final exam ==
The spring 2012 final exam was assigned April 26 and due May 3 at 5:00 p.m. Its first page contained the instructions: "The exam is completely open book, open note, open internet, etc. However, in all other regards, this should fall under similar guidelines that apply to in-class exams. More specifically, students may not discuss the exam with others—this includes resident tutors, writing centers, etc." The use of etc. has been questioned.

Students complained about confusing questions on the final exam. Due to "some good questions" from students, Platt clarified three exam questions by email on April 30. Platt cancelled his office hours on the May 3 due date on short notice. Many students received assistance from the teaching fellows.

== Spring 2013 – present ==
Government 1310 had its spring 2013 Harvard College course listing removed as of October 7, 2012. Platt taught the course through the Harvard Extension School only for spring 2013 and spring 2014. Grading was based on two essay exams, ten quizzes and the final. The collaboration policy forbade any collaboration.

== Investigation ==
A teaching fellow noticed similarities between a small number of exams during grading in May 2012. Platt reported the suspected plagiarism in a letter to administrative board secretary John "Jay" L. Ellison on May 14. The similarities were first noticed in answers for the bonus short answer question "Describe two developments in the history of Congress that ostensibly gave individual MCs [members of Congress] in the House greater freedom and/or control but ultimately centralized power in the hands of party leadership." Some students picked the "somewhat obscure" pair of the Cannon Revolt of 1910 and Henry Clay and "all the answers use the same (incorrect) reading of the course material in arguments that are identically structured." Additional comparisons revealed possible collaboration on the other questions.

The administrative board reviewed all exams over the summer and flagged roughly 125 for suspected collaboration. The suspects constitute nearly half of the 279 students enrolled in the class and almost two percent of Harvard College's undergraduate student body. Harris said the similarities include "answers that look quite alike to answers that appear to have been lifted in their entirety." Harvard enlisted "supplemental fact finders" to deal with the load. Peter F. Lake, a Stetson University College of Law professor, and Harvard alumnus, estimated that it would take approximated fifty hours per student totaling "essentially one administrator’s entire year of energy."

Harvard announced the investigation publicly on August 30, 2012. Dean of undergraduate education Jay M. Harris justified the announcement as a springboard to raise awareness and a teachable moment. A senior under investigation dismissed this explanation, writing, "Harvard chose to go public with this story to first and foremost save their own asses."

On the same day as the announcement, Harvard Faculty of Arts and Sciences dean Michael D. Smith sent an email to all faculty members informing them of the investigation and suggesting that they clarify their collaboration policies.

Each student was given copies of their exams and similar ones, then had to submit a written explanation. The student met with an administrative board subcommittee and was shown the other students' statements. Some students named the classmates they collaborated with. The subcommittee recommended an action to the full board.

Cases were finalized in September and December 2012. Students forced to withdraw vanished from campus as verdicts were issued every Tuesday. The administrative board completed its investigation in December 2012.

== Discipline ==
Potential discipline for academic dishonesty includes a year's forced withdrawal. In May 2010 the administrative board gained the ability to "exclude" students and fail them. IvyGate published rumors that the administrative board developed a "tiered punishment scheme" based on general classes of collaboration but Faculty of Arts and Sciences spokesperson Jeff Neal stated that each case would be evaluated individually.

Students could withdraw voluntarily before their cases were closed, according to an email sent by Ellison to resident deans. If convicted and sentenced to a required withdrawal, the leave of absence would be credited as time served. A forced withdrawal includes a permanent notation on the student's transcript. Harvard biology professor Richard Losick calls the note "a severe punishment" and one suspected student describes it as "almost the kiss of death in the academic realm." During their absence, students must "hold a full-time, paid, non-academic job in a non-family situation, for at least six consecutive months" before becoming eligible for readmittance.

On February 1, 2013, Smith revealed that "somewhat more than half" of the students were forced to withdraw "for a period of time" and "roughly half" of the remainder were put on disciplinary probation. Smith's e-mail covers all administrative board cases for the past term without mentioning Government 1310 or the scandal, but a Harvard official said they were from one course. For the majority of cases, the "period of time" is two semesters according to students.

=== Athletes ===
Harvard Crimson varsity team athletes will lose a year of Ivy League eligibility if they play any games and are forced to withdraw. If they register and attend classes before withdrawing, the Harvard Department of Athletics Student-Athlete Handbook says "In nearly all circumstances, [they] will be ineligible to compete in the first year [they] return to Harvard." According to estimates by students, over half the class and up to half of those suspected are athletes. The Harvard Crimson football team was expected to lose players, but it won its season opener. None of the starters left the team. Sports Illustrated reported that Kyle Casey, current co-captain and leading scorer of last year's 2011–12 Harvard Crimson men's basketball team withdrew from Harvard ahead of the registration deadline. The Boston Herald reported that co-captain Brandyn Curry was expected to withdraw also. On October 9, 2012 a team spokesperson confirmed that they "are not playing this season." Platt highlighted a group of baseball players in his letter to the Ad Board. One athlete told The Boston Globe that his teammates combined notes while travelling on their team bus. Four ice hockey players left the team.

In a telephone interview with the Associated Press, Harvard president Drew Faust said that athletes should not be set apart or given special treatment. Faust said "It is not about one student group. It’s not confined to any one student group." Athletes and non-athletes withdrew voluntarily.

== Reaction ==
=== Students ===
Students claimed that collaboration like note-sharing and consulting teaching fellows was widespread. One student produced shared lecture notes and argued successfully that they were the source. Students under investigation complained about uncertainty stemming from the length of the investigation and the Administrative Board's hiatus over the summer. One 2012 graduate now working on Wall Street told Bloomberg Businessweek "Dragging us into this investigation now, when we have financial obligations and jobs, seems very unfair." Current students expressed concerns about pro-rated tuition costs where students forced to withdraw later would pay more. Some students did not receive their verdicts until shortly before finals. In the interest of "financial equity," Harvard calculated tuition refunds for all required withdrawals based on September 30, 2012. Harvard Extension School students wrote to The Boston Globe and GovLoop to debunk claims that Platt encouraged collaborating on exams.

A number of students responded to Harvard's announcement by going to the media themselves and "trying to present the other side" of the story. A senior reached out to The New York Observer and Salon. He told Salon "we’re being scapegoated" and that many students are ready to file lawsuits. One student who had contacted a lawyer told The Harvard Crimson "Harvard has created this war between the students and the fricking school, and this is a war that I am willing and very eager to fight." Experts said that Harvard can be sued for procedural errors, lost employment opportunities or intentional or negligent infliction of emotional distress. After the final announcement, lawyers said that lawsuits would be difficult and unlikely. Harvey A. Silverglate said "Schaer vs. Brandeis makes Harvard very close to invulnerable." One lawyer said students may be waiting to graduate and avoid retribution. The statute of limitations for breach of contract is six years in Massachusetts.

Implicated students and parents were disappointed by Smith's e-mail and blamed Platt. Other students thought the punishment was fair. Robert Peabody, an attorney for two students said the process was too slow and calling it "death by a thousand nicks", "living torture", "basically hell" and "twisting in the wind." He said his clients "emotionally deteriorated over the course of the semester."

Harvard Crimson's survey of graduating seniors of the class of 2013 estimated that 32.0% of students cheated on "papers or take-home tests," with 7.0% self-reporting their cheating.

=== Harvard ===
An honor code was drafted by Harvard's Committee on Academic Integrity and adopted on May 6, 2014 by the Faculty of Arts and Sciences by "overwhelmingly" positive vote. Colin Diver, former president of Reed College writes that an "Honor Principle" must be the basis of a culture of academic integrity. Some professors defended the take-home exam format.

Erika Christakis and Nicholas A. Christakis write that there is a "national crisis of academic dishonesty." Harry R. Lewis entreats Harvard to "Know thyself." Howard Gardner writes that the case exposes "ethical rot" at Harvard. Gardner contemplates the scandal "as a play in four acts."

Faust, Smith and Harris made statements regarding the investigation at the first Faculty of Arts and Sciences meeting of Fall 2012 on October 2. Faust also granted an interview with The Harvard Crimson. She refused comment on student athletes saying the investigation "includes a wide spectrum of students."

The instructors of Harvard's Expository Writing Program are using the scandal to accentuate the anti-plagiarism principles they have already been teaching.

=== Thomas G. Stemberg ===
Thomas G. Stemberg, prominent Harvard alumnus and Staples Inc. founder, wrote a heavily critical letter addressed to Faust dated January 6, 2013. Stemberg was co-chair of the Friends of Harvard Basketball fundraising group. The 2012–13 Harvard Crimson men's basketball team lost two stars to the scandal. Stemberg criticized Harvard for punishing students who used collaborative notes alongside those who copied answers. He alleged that students had escaped punishment by lying in their testimony. He called Platt and other undergraduate instructors "clearly not qualified." Stemberg said to Bloomberg News "Those students who cut and pasted exam answers deserved to get kicked out. The rest of them should have been vindicated, and the faculty member fired." The other co-chair Thomas W. Mannix disapproved of how the media focused on the basketball team and individual players.

=== Commentary ===
Editorials by The Harvard Crimson call out widespread confusion over the acceptability of collaboration as the scandal's root cause and focus on extracurricular activity. An editorial by The Cavalier Daily blames the "poorly worded exam instructions" and the phrase "open Internet". According to an editorial by The Boston Globe, the cheating exposes a lack of quality in Government 1310. An editorial by The Christian Science Monitor examines the challenges of teaching integrity. Naomi Schaefer Riley writes in Bloomberg View that the scandal highlights problems in the college admissions process. Farhad Manjoo, writing for Slate, believes "The students should be celebrated for collaborating" as they would in the real world. Sarah Green writes in Harvard Business Review that a developed love of learning would prevent cheating. Forbes contributor Richard Levick blames Harvard for drawing out the investigation and failing to maintain confidentiality. Alexandra Petri writes in The Washington Post that cheating is caused by an aversion to failure. In The Boston Globe, Lauren Stiller Rikleen blames the Millennial Generation's inexperience on a lack of structure. A number of student newspapers published opinion pieces on cheating inspired by the event. Jonathan Zimmerman of the Steinhardt School of Culture, Education, and Human Development at New York University writes in The Christian Science Monitor that "poor teaching" encourages cheating.

On February 11, 2013 The Daily Show did a segment on the scandal.

=== Yale ===
The Yale Freshman Class Council designed a shirt for the Harvard–Yale football game replacing "Veritas" in the Harvard logo with "Cheaters" or "Cheatas" but the Yale Licensing Office rejected the design. The approved shirt has "Try cheating your way out of this one" on its back. Harvard won the game.

Yale College Dean Mary Miller discouraged instructors from using take-home finals in direct response to the scandal.

== Administrative Board ==
On October 23–26, 2012 The Harvard Crimson published a four-part series about the Administrative Board and the changes made in 2009–2010. The Harvard Crimson followed up with a critical editorial. One criticism is resident deans are normally trusted advisors but communications with them are not protected by privilege.

== Collaboration policies ==
On August 30, 2012, the same day as the announcement, Harvard Faculty of Arts and Sciences Dean Michael D. Smith sent an email to all faculty members informing them of the investigation and suggesting that they clarify their collaboration policies.

Harris reminded instructors that course syllabi must contain explicit collaboration policies before the Spring 2013 semester. Some classes also went over their policies in their first lecture.

== Search of deans' email accounts ==
On March 9, 2013 The Boston Globe reported that Harvard searched 16 resident deans' email accounts seeking the source of a leaked email shortly after the scandal broke. On March 11 Smith and Evelynn Hammonds confirmed the search in an official statement. One dean had forwarded the email to two students in their role as an advisor and it was redistributed, reaching The Harvard Crimson. In light of a second leak of an Administrative Board meeting and with no explanations forthcoming, administrators approved the email search. Information technology staff searched the subject lines of the deans' staff email accounts. Only the dean responsible was notified about the search. The statement said Senior Resident Dean Sharon Howell was also informed but she and an anonymous Harvard official said she was not. The Faculty of Arts and Sciences privacy policy requires members to be "notified at the earliest possible opportunity." The policy was partially due to suspected snooping by Harvard President Lawrence Summers. It was not clear if resident deans are faculty or merely staff. The search breaks the faculty policy but not the staff policy. Faculty members reacted negatively to the search.

Resident deans have separate administrative and personal email accounts. The first search examined only the administrative account.

On April 2, 2013 Hammonds disclosed that additional searches were run on the deans' two email accounts seeking communication with reporters for The Harvard Crimson. In April, Hammonds announced that her earlier statement had not been complete as she had failed to recollect a second email search, this time of the accounts of Allston Burr Resident Deans, academics who live in Harvard's undergraduate housing and advise students. Hammonds did not inform Smith of this second search, violating the Faculty of Arts and Sciences' email privacy policy.

The Harvard Crimson called on Hammonds to resign, stating: "Since Hammonds provided misinformation regarding the highly sensitive issue of email searches, and since she violated clear policy regarding those searches, her presence at the helm of the College stands as a roadblock to rebuilding trust between students, faculty, and the administration."

On May 28, Hammonds announced that she would resign to lead a new Harvard research program on race and gender in science. Hammonds said that her decision to resign was unrelated to the email search incident.

An outside investigation run by Michael B. Keating of Foley Hoag found that the searches were done in good faith.
