= Massachusetts Route 145 =

State highway in Suffolk County, Massachusetts, US

Route 145
- Route 145 highlighted in red

Route information
- Maintained by MassDOT
- Length: 6.716 mi (10.808 km)
- Existed: 1958 (c. 1954 as Route 45)–present

Major junctions
- South end: Route 1A in Boston
- North end: Route 16 in Revere

Location
- Country: United States
- State: Massachusetts
- Counties: Suffolk

Highway system
- Massachusetts State Highway System; Interstate; US; State
← Route 143	→ Route 146
← US 44	→ Route 47

Route 145 is a 6.716-mile-long (10.808 km) circuitous south–north urban state highway in Massachusetts. It is entirely within Suffolk County and primarily serves the peninsular town of Winthrop from East Boston and Revere. Its southern terminus is at Route 1A in East Boston and its northern terminus is at Route 16 in Revere.

== Route description ==
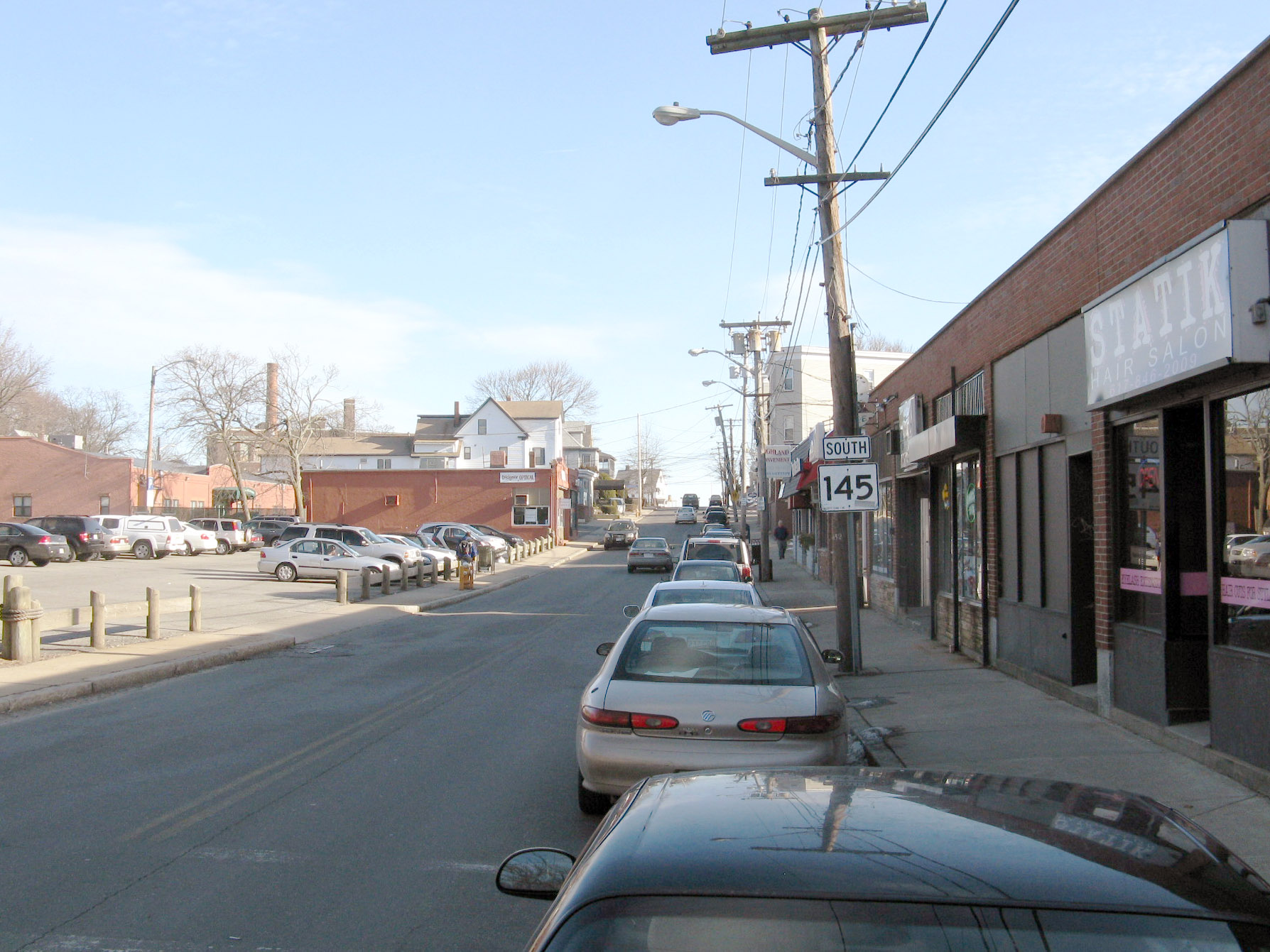
Southbound at Crest Avenue in Winthrop

Although it is officially a south–north highway, Route 145 travels in each of the four main compass directions at some point along its route. Route 145 begins at the intersection of Neptune Road and Bennington Street in East Boston, just after the point where the Mass Pike/I-90 ends and merges with Route 1A. An access road from Route 1A junction travels a short distance on Neptune Road to Bennington Street, with a right turn onto Bennington Street marking the beginning of Route 145. Route 145 travels northeast along this major arterial street to the Orient Heights neighborhood and then bears right along Saratoga Street at Orient Heights Square. The route continues along Saratoga Street east until crossing into Winthrop over a bridge at Belle Isle Inlet.

Route 145 travels a short distance down Main Street in Winthrop before turning right and traveling nearly due south along Pleasant Street. This residential section of Winthrop features Donovan's Beach which offers a view of the Boston skyline looking west-southwest across Logan Airport. Pleasant Street continues south then bears left a few times before becoming Washington Avenue, where Route 145 travels east to meet Veterans Road. At this intersection, Route 145 heads north along Veterans Road while traffic heading for Point Shirley and Deer Island continues to Shirley Street. Along Veterans Road the route heads north through Winthrop and then bears left at the intersection with the north end of Winthrop Shore Drive to become Crest Avenue and then Revere Street, heading generally northwest.

Leaving Winthrop, Route 145 enters Revere and is called Winthrop Parkway, which travels north along the Atlantic Ocean past Revere's Beachmont neighborhood and meets Revere Beach Parkway at Eliot Circle. From the circle Route 145 travels south then west as the beginning of the westbound parkway. Technically the route ends as the parkway crosses under Route 1A after passing the Suffolk Downs area and travels less than 1,000 feet (300 m) to meet Route 16.

== History ==

Modern Route 145 was first commissioned between 1954 and 1956 as Route 45. The route was renumbered to 145 in 1958.

== Major intersections ==
The entire route is in Suffolk County.

Location	mi	km	Destinations	Notes
Boston	0.000	0.000	Bennington Street south	Continuation beyond Route 1A and Neptune Road
Boston	0.000	0.000	Route 1A south / Neptune Road – Logan Airport, Sumner Tunnel, Boston	Southern terminus
Revere	6.679	10.749	Route 1A south – Logan Airport, Sumner Tunnel	
Revere	6.716	10.808	Route 16 (Revere Beach Parkway) – Tobin Bridge, Chelsea	Northern terminus
1.000 mi = 1.609 km; 1.000 km = 0.621 mi: Incomplete access
