= Winthrop High School (Massachusetts) =

Location
- 400 Main Street; Winthrop, Massachusetts 02152; United States
- Coordinates: 42.3803°N 70.9794°W

Information
- School district: Winthrop Public Schools
- Principal: Matthew Crombie
- Grades: 9–12
- Gender: Coed
- Enrollment: 568 (2024–2025)
- Colors: Blue & Gold
- Athletics conference: Northeastern Conference
- Mascot: Viking
- Website: whs.winthrop.k12.ma.us

Winthrop High School is a public four-year high school in Winthrop, Massachusetts, United States. It is a part of Winthrop Public Schools.

The current school building, with 187,917 square feet (17,458.1 m^{2}) of space, had a cost of $80.2 million, with about $42.5 million or 60% of the costs covered by the Massachusetts School Building Authority. The building is shared with Winthrop Middle School. The first steel beams were put up in 2015 and opening was to occur in fall 2016. Note: Winthrop Middle School and Winthrop High School are housed in the same building, but are two separate and distinct schools with their own administration.

== Sports ==
The WHS Ice hockey team won the MIAA 2025 State championship at TD Garden.

== Notable alumni ==
- Paul Francis Anderson, American prelate of the Roman Catholic Church
- Patricia Brown, pitcher who played in the All-American Girls Professional Baseball League
- Mike Eruzione, 1980 USA Olympic hockey team gold medalist
- John B. Kennedy, American city manager and politician
- Harriet White Medin, American actress and dialogue coach
- Beatrice Roberts, American film actress
- Larry Thomas, American professional baseball pitcher
- Dale Dunbar, former NHL Defenseman
