= Cummings Elementary School =

Cummings Elementary School may refer to:

- Arthur T. Cummings Elementary School, Winthrop, Massachusetts, United States, within Winthrop Public Schools
- Cummings Elementary School, Walker, Michigan, United States, within Grandville Public Schools
- Cummings K-8 School (formerly Cummings Elementary School), Memphis, Tennessee, United States, within Shelby County Schools, formerly of Memphis City Schools
- Cummings Elementary School, Houston, Texas, United States, within Alief Independent School District
