= Winthrop Public Schools =

Winthrop Public Schools may refer to:

- Winthrop School District (Arkansas)
- Winthrop Public Schools (Maine)
- Winthrop Public Schools (Massachusetts)
