= Lauren Rikleen =

American attorney, author and speaker

- Born: Winthrop, Massachusetts, U.S.
- Education: Brandeis University (BA); Boston College Law School (JD)
- Occupations: Lawyer, author, speaker

Lauren Stiller Rikleen is an American attorney, author and speaker, trainer and consultant on workplace issues. Her two books focusing on the legal profession are Ending the Gauntlet: Removing Barriers to Women's Success in the Law, released in 2006, and Ladder Down: Success Strategies from Women who will be Hiring, Reviewing, and Promoting You, released in 2016. She is also the author of You Raised Us - Now Work With Us: Millennials, Career Success, and Building Strong Workplace Teams (published by the American Bar Association in March 2014 and in paperback 2016), and The Shield of Silence: How Power Perpetuates a Culture of Harassment and Bullying in the Workplace.

== Early life and education ==
Rikleen was born in Winthrop, Massachusetts, and graduated from Winthrop High School. She attended Clark University and is a graduate of Brandeis University, from which she graduated magna cum laude in 1975. She earned a J.D. degree from Boston College Law School in 1979.

== Career ==
Her law career began in 1979 as the assistant director of the Franklin N. Flaschner Judicial Institute, a Massachusetts non-profit engaged in judicial education. In 1981, she joined the U.S. Environmental Protection Agency, Region 1, as an attorney. In 1984, she was hired by the non-profit Clean Sites, Inc. She became an assistant attorney general in early 1987 in the Massachusetts Office of Attorney General, first in its Government Bureau and later in its Environmental Protection Division. In 1988, she joined the Massachusetts-based law firm Bowditch & Dewey, where she founded its environmental law practice and later directed the Bowditch Institute for Women's Success. She established the Rikleen Institute for Strategic Leadership in 2011. She is also a former president of the Boston Bar Association and a former member of the American Bar Association Board of Governors.

The president and founder of the Rikleen Institute for Strategic Leadership, Rikleen formerly served as an executive-in-residence at the Boston College Center for Work & Family in the Carroll School of Management.

An opinion piece by Rikleen in The Boston Globe was noted as one of several national commentaries on the 2012 Harvard cheating scandal. In it, Rikleen suggested the event could have been the result of the Millennial Generation's inexperience with navigating ambiguity. When U.S. District Judge Richard Kopf wrote in a blog that women attorneys should tone down their dress in court, Rikleen told the Associated Press his statements perpetuated a double standard.

=== Books ===
Rikleen's first book, Ending the Gauntlet: Removing Barriers to Women's Success in the Law, published in March 2006 by Thomson Reuters Legalworks, focuses on the institutional challenges and roadblocks women face in their efforts to succeed at law firms. Ladder Down: Success Strategies from Women who will be Hiring, Reviewing, and Promoting You provides career advice to lawyers from successful women lawyers around the world. Fortune.com, in an August 2014 interview with Rikleen, wrote that Rikleen's third book, You Raised Us - Now Work With Us: Millennials, Career Success, and Building Strong Workplace Teams, turned her attention to young people in the workplace by examining the role of younger generations in the workplace and the challenges they face. CBS Boston's "NightSide with Dan Rea," in a radio interview and on his Web site, said that while some claim "this is the most spoiled generation our country has ever seen," Rikleen in her book wrote that it was an unfair stereotype. In March 2016, Ankerwycke Publishing released Millennials in paperback.

The Boston Herald wrote that as part of Rikleen's research for the book, she "surveyed more than 1,000 people born from 1978 to 2000 for their opinions on entitlement, loyalty, commitment, family relationships, communication, technology and how they view success." Fortune.com (which TIME magazine picked up in September 2014), citing the survey, wrote that it "suggests that young workers are looking to big businesses to address the world’s problems." A piece on KGOradio.com about the book centered on stereotypes that baby boomers and millennials face at work, and how to help a mixed-generation team succeed. AARP quoted Rikleen in its review as saying, "If boomers want to coexist with twentysomethings, then they — the older generation — need an attitude adjustment."

A review of The Shield of Silence in Associations Now, the publication of ASAE (the American Society of Association Executives) described the book as “the most compelling—and alarming—book on workplace misconduct across America in 2019.”

== Awards ==
- 2017 – American Bar Association Margaret Brent Women Lawyers of Achievement Award
- 2016 – Massachusetts Lawyers Weekly Top Women of Law - Circle of Excellence Award
- 2015 – Named as one of 50 Influencers in Aging by PBS's Next Avenue
- 2010 - Leading Woman Award Honoree, Girl Scouts of Eastern Massachusetts
- 2007 - Barbara Gray Humanitarian Award from Voices Against Violence
- 2005 - Lelia J. Robinson Award from the Women's Bar Association of Massachusetts
- 2004 - Boston College Law School Alumni Award for Excellence in Law
- 2001 - Athena Award for Professional Excellence
