= Revere Beach Parkway =

Road in Greater Boston, Massachusetts

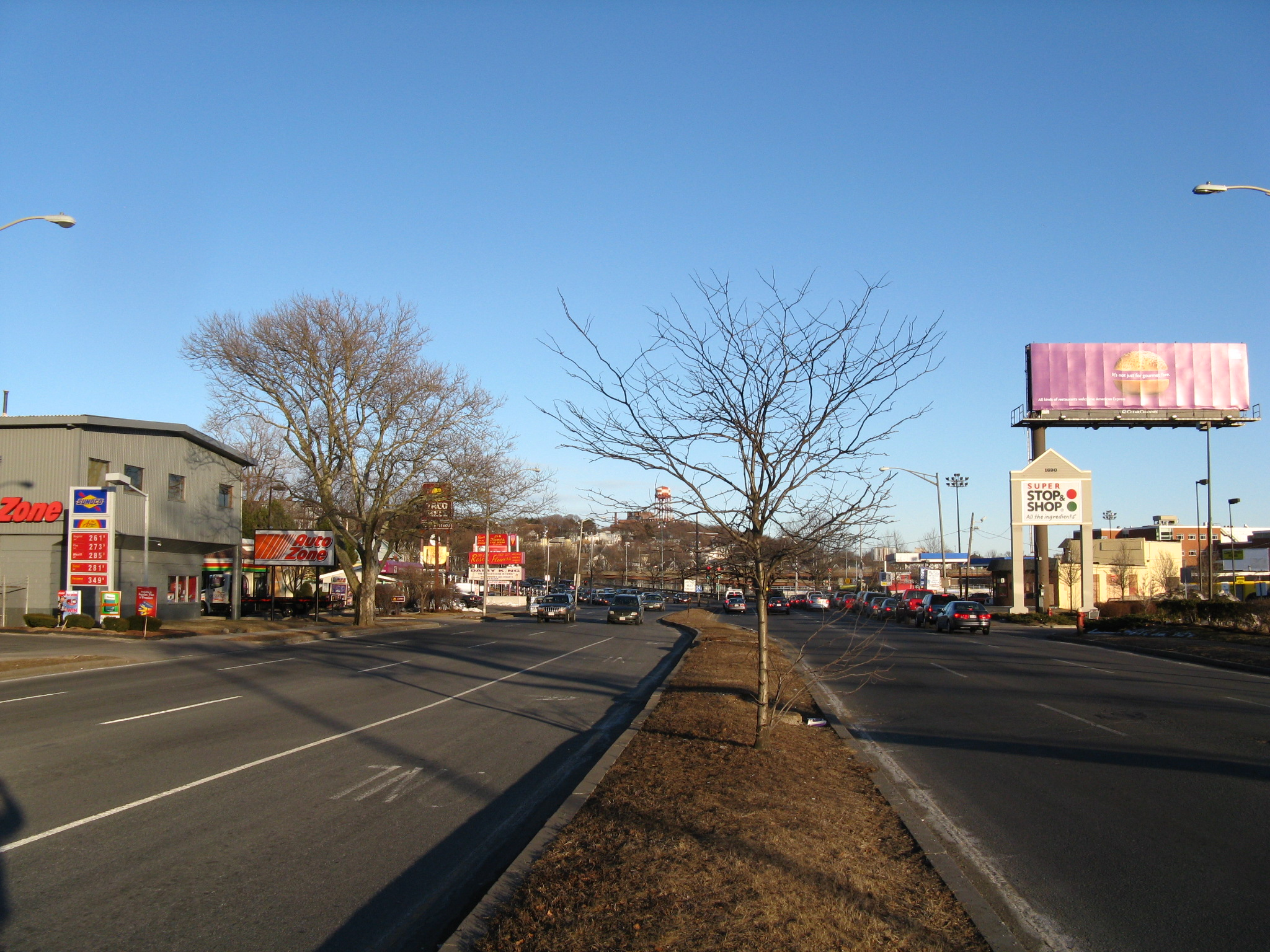
- Looking eastbound at Everett Avenue in Everett
- Interactive map of Revere Beach Parkway
- Part of: Route 16 / Route 145
- Maintained by: Department of Conservation and Recreation
- Length: 5.3 mi (8.5 km)
- Location: Greater Boston, Massachusetts
- West end: Route 28 in Medford
- East end: Route 1A / Route 60 in Revere
- Revere Beach Parkway—Metropolitan Park System of Greater Boston
- U.S. National Register of Historic Places
- U.S. Historic district
- Location within Massachusetts Location within the United States
- Location: Medford, Everett, Chelsea, and Revere, Massachusetts
- Coordinates: 42°24′7.5″N 71°2′40.5″W
- Built: 1899
- Architect: Charles Eliot
- MPS: Metropolitan Park System of Greater Boston MPS
- NRHP reference No.: 07001241
- Added to NRHP: December 6, 2007

Revere Beach Parkway is a historic parkway in the suburbs immediately north of Boston, Massachusetts. It begins at Wellington Circle in Medford, where the road leading to the west is Mystic Valley Parkway, and the north–south road is the Fellsway, designated Route 28. The parkway proceeds east, ending at Eliot Circle, the junction of Revere Beach Boulevard and Winthrop Parkway in Revere. In between, the parkway passes through the cities of Everett and Chelsea. The parkway was built between 1896 and 1904 to provide access from interior communities to Revere Beach. It underwent two major periods of capacity expansion, in the 1930s and again in the 1950s. The parkway is designated as part of Route 16 west of Route 1A, and as part of Route 145 east of that point.

The route of the roadway, along with a number of specific features relating to its original period of construction and those of the later expansions up to 1957, was added to the National Register of Historic Places as a historic district in 2007.

== History ==
Revere Beach Parkway was one of the first parkways proposed by landscape architect Charles Eliot, identified in an 1893 report to a predecessor of the Metropolitan District Commission. Work began in 1897, with the construction of a bridge across the railroad tracks of the Boston, Revere Beach and Lynn Railroad, now the MBTA Blue Line right-of-way. Although this bridge was lengthened to cross State Road, the original 1899 northern bridge abutment survives.

Survey work was done in 1898 to identify the route through Chelsea and Everett. The Olmsted Brothers, who consulted on the parkway design, suggested its width be tailored to the cost required to take the land it ran over, resulting in a wider right-of-way in less expensive areas. By 1899 the entire route had been designed and land acquired, and the eastern section from Eliot Circle to Winthrop Avenue had been completed. When originally built, the parkway ran adjacent to Winthrop Street, but the two were merged during road widening in the 1950s.

Construction between Winthrop Avenue and Main Street in Everett took place between 1900 and 1901, but was complicated by the crossing of the Boston and Maine tracks just west of where Massachusetts Route 1A crosses the parkway. Apparently originally expected to be a grade crossing, in 1903 a pony truss bridge was built to span the tracks. This bridge was replaced in 2015 by a bolted Parker pony truss.

The final section of the parkway, between Main Street in Everett and the Fellsway, was built between 1903 and 1905. This stretch included three significant bridges: two across railroad tracks, and one across the Malden River. The railroad bridges were of steel girder construction, and the Malden River bridge was a drawbridge. The first of these bridges, across the B&M Saugus Branch line, is now used by the Poirer Memorial Roadway, and the parkway crosses the right of way on a modern six-lane bridge. The second, the Woods Memorial Bridge, was a double-leaf simple trunnion drawbridge built in 1954 to replace the original. The third bridge, which now crosses the MBTA Orange Line as well as commuter rail lines, was first replaced in 1956 with a modern six-lane bridge. The Woods Memorial Bridge and the attached bridge crossing the MBTA tracks were later replaced with two fixed bridges constructed between 2015 and 2019.

The roadway has been significantly altered over the years; this has mainly consisted of widening to allow for increased traffic flow. There are two places where original alignments of the parkway remain. One is the Poirer Memorial Roadway, which is a westbound access road from Santilli Circle in Everett to the Sweetser Overpass. The other segment is now part of an access road in Revere on the north side of the parkway.

In 2024, the city of Everett won a federal Reconnecting Communities grant to redesign the rotary at Sweetser Circle.

== Major intersections ==
| County | Location | mi | km | Destinations | Notes |
|---|---|---|---|---|---|
| Middlesex | Medford | 0.0 | 0.0 | Route 16 west (Mystic Valley Parkway) / Route 28 (Fellsway) – Arlington, Watertown, Somerville, Boston, Stoneham, Reading | Route 16 / Parkway continues west |
| Middlesex | Medford | 0.4 | 0.64 | Wellington Station (MBTA) & Rivers Edge Drive | Exit on Westbound Route 16 towards Rivers Edge Dr, Direct exit on Eastbound Route 16 to Wellington Station. |
| Middlesex | Everett | 0.6– 1.3 | 0.97– 2.1 | Route 99 – Everett, Boston | Traffic circle with additional eastbound entrance |
| Middlesex | Everett | 2.7– 3.2 | 4.3– 5.1 | US 1 – Boston, Tobin Bridge, Saugus, Newburyport | Interchange with additional westbound exit |
| Suffolk | Revere | 3.6 | 5.8 | Route 107 north (Broadway) – Revere, Chelsea, Lynn | Interchange; southern terminus of Route 107 |
| Suffolk | Revere | 4.3 | 6.9 | Route 16 east | Parkway turns onto Winthrop Avenue; western terminus of Route 145 |
| Suffolk | Revere | 4.4 | 7.1 | Route 1A south – Logan Airport, Sumner Tunnel | Interchange |
| Suffolk | Revere | 5.3 | 8.5 | Route 145 east (Winthrop Parkway) / Ocean Avenue | Elliot Circle; to Revere Beach Reservation; Route 145 continues east |
1.000 mi = 1.609 km; 1.000 km = 0.621 mi: Route transition

== See also ==
- National Register of Historic Places listings in Suffolk County, Massachusetts
- National Register of Historic Places listings in Middlesex County, Massachusetts
- National Register of Historic Places listings in Medford, Massachusetts
