= Yirrell Beach =

Beach in Winthrop, Massachusetts, U.S.

Coordinates: 42°21′45.35″N 70°58′10.17″W

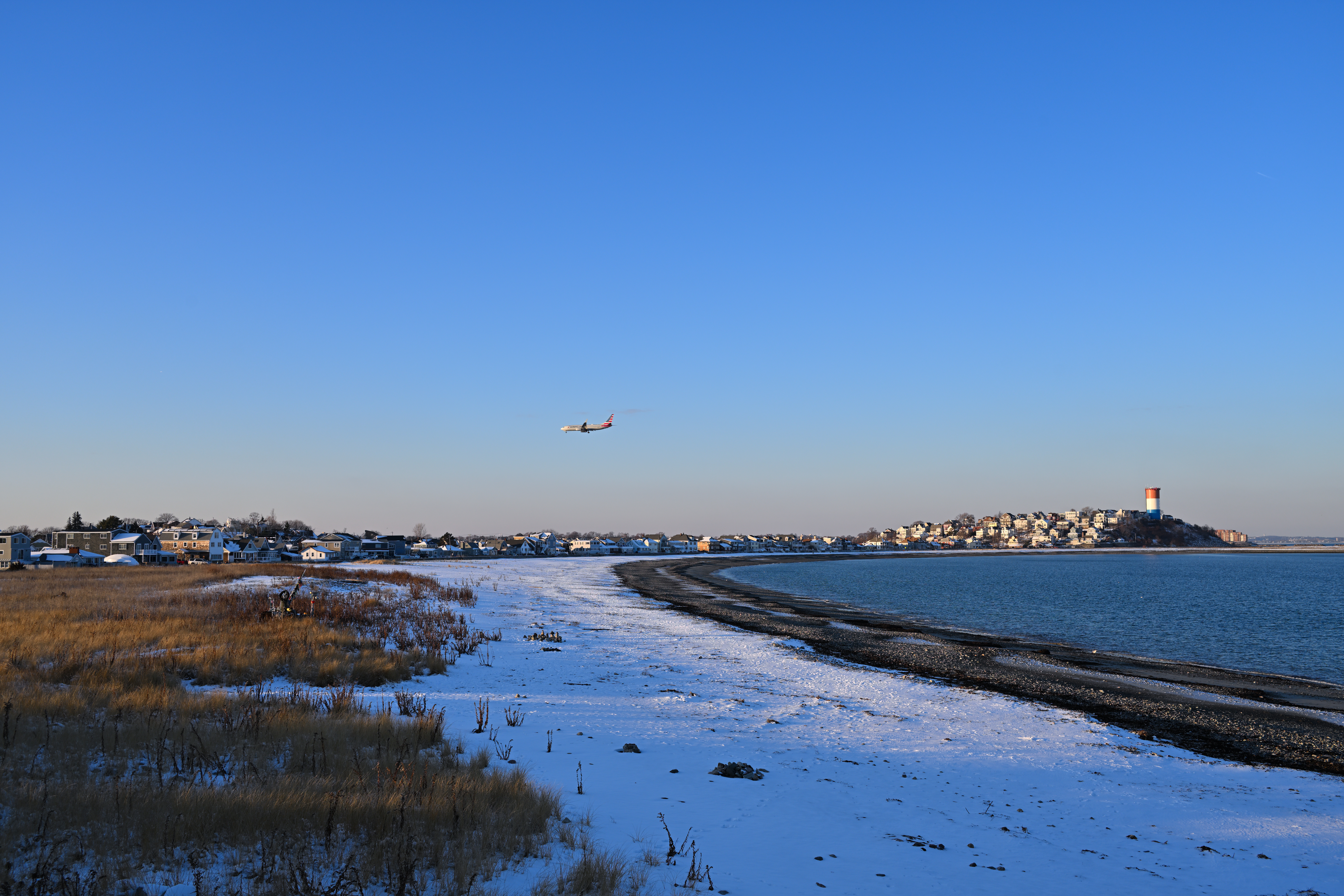
Yirrell Beach in the winter, looking north from Deer Island in 2024

Yirrell Beach is a main beach of Winthrop, Massachusetts. The southern part is also known as Point Shirley Beach, as the neighborhood is Point Shirley. Farther north is Winthrop Beach, Short Beach and eventually Revere Beach in Revere.

Yirrell Beach is located along Shirley Street and is a popular destination for families with small children, as the area by the base of Water Tower Hill is shallow for 300 feet (91 m). The beach is home to Winthrop's Sandcastle Festival in June and the Old Fashioned Family Day at the Beach in July.
