= Winthrop Shore Drive =

Parkway in Winthrop, Massachusetts

- Winthrop Shore Dr., Metropolitan Park System of Greater Boston
- U.S. National Register of Historic Places
- U.S. Historic district
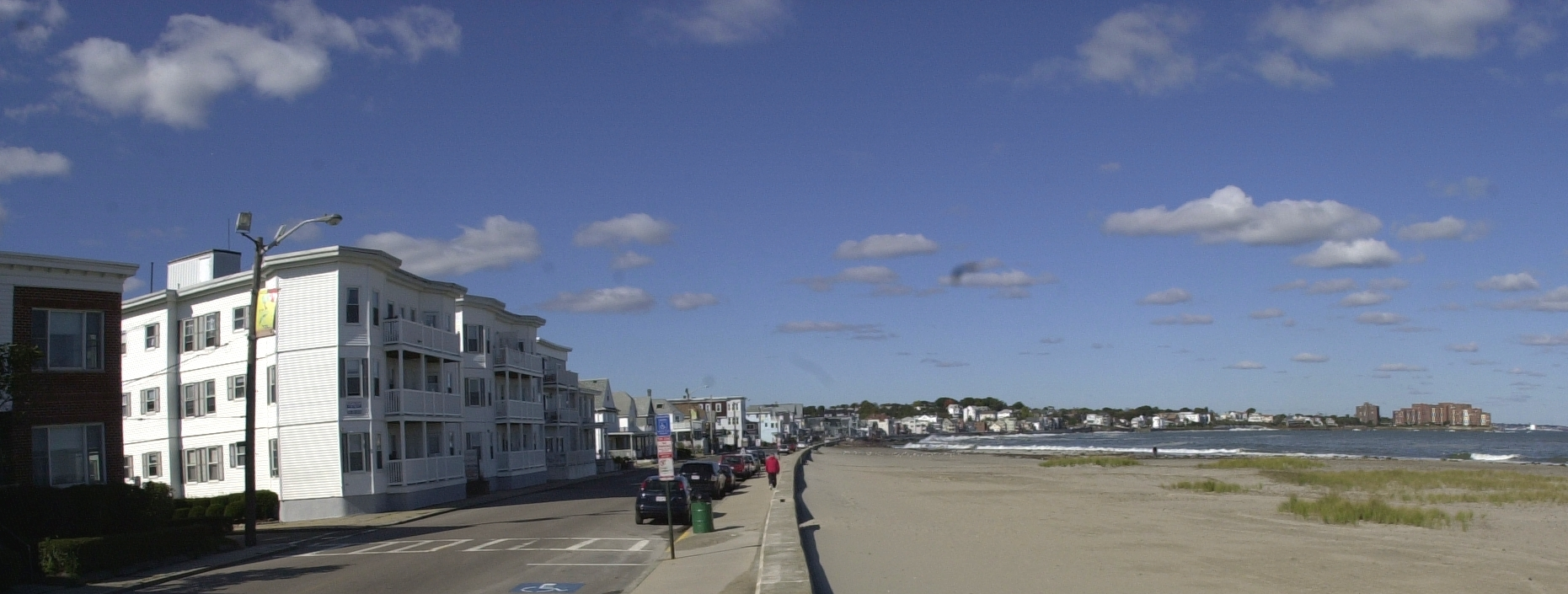

- Location within Massachusetts Location within the United States
- Location: Winthrop Shore Dr., Winthrop, Massachusetts
- Coordinates: 42°22′14″N 70°58′5″W
- Area: 6 acres (2.4 ha)
- Built: 1899
- Architect: Charles Eliot (landscape architect); Olmsted Brothers
- MPS: Metropolitan Park System of Greater Boston MPS
- NRHP reference No.: 03001469
- Added to NRHP: January 21, 2004

Winthrop Shore Drive is a historic parkway in Winthrop, Massachusetts. The mile-long parkway runs through the Winthrop Beach Reservation, and is administered by the Massachusetts Department of Conservation and Recreation (DCR). The parkway is one of a series of ocean parkways (and the second one built) that make up a network of parkways connecting major open spaces in the Greater Boston area. Both the parkway and reservation were designed in the mid-1890s by Charles Eliot for the Metropolitan Parks Commission, a predecessor to the DCR. Land was acquired for the parkway in 1899, and construction was largely completed in 1900.

The parkway was listed on the National Register of Historic Places in 2004.

== See also ==
- National Register of Historic Places listings in Suffolk County, Massachusetts
