= GovLoop =

American technology company

GovLoop is an online social network for people in and around government. The community, which is built on Ning technology, was originally aimed at federal, state, and local government employees in the United States, but has since grown to include students, government contractors, employees of governments outside the United States, and individuals interested in government service. GovLoop hosts personal profile pages, discussion groups and forums, blogs, photographs, videos, slide presentations, a wiki, and two weekly podcasts.

GovLoop was founded in May 2008 by Stephen A. Ressler, then a 28-year-old information specialist with the United States Department of Homeland Security. By April 2009, it had 10,000 members. In August 2010, membership exceeded 32,000.

In September 2009, the GovLoop community was acquired by GovDelivery, a government communications firm in St. Paul, Minnesota, whereupon Ressler left government employment; he is now the CEO of GovLoop. The community employs a community manager, Andrew Krzmarzick, and relies on volunteer community leaders to assist newcomers and monitor contributed content.

As of May 2010, GovLoop hosted more than 700 discussion groups and more than 5,400 blog posts on topics ranging from federal acquisition policies to implementing new government transparency requirements to "Gov Gourmet," a group dedicated to cooking. In July 2010, GovLoop will host its first conference with Young Government Leaders entitled Next Generation of Government Summit, targeted to rising government leaders.

GovLoop has inspired similar sites to be created for public sector employees in Israel, Netherlands, Brazil, Australia, Spain and other Spanish speaking countries.

As of January 2013, GovLoop has over 65,000 members and has been featured as a case study of government innovation in books such as Macrowikinomics.
