= Neptune Road =

Road in Boston, Massachusetts

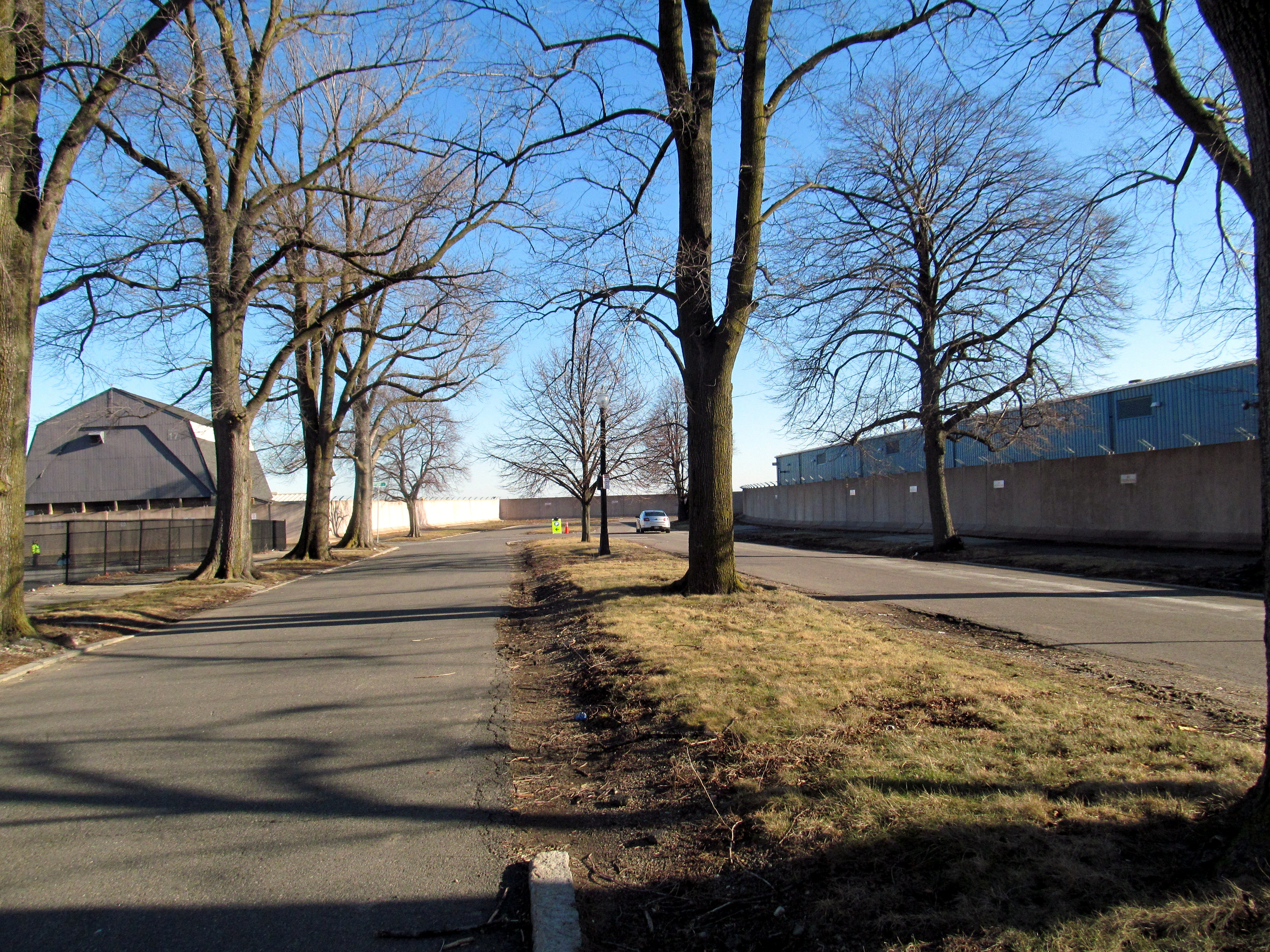
- The remaining stub of Neptune Road viewed from Lovell Street in February 2016
- Interactive map of Neptune Road
- Location: East Boston, Massachusetts
- Postal code: 02128
- Coordinates: 42°22′43″N 71°1′23″W

Neptune Road is located in the East Boston neighborhood of Boston, Massachusetts. The road is fragmented, bisected by the Massachusetts Bay Transportation Authority's Blue Line which surfaces from the subway southwest of the road. Much of the portion southeast of the train tracks is encompassed within Logan International Airport.

== History ==
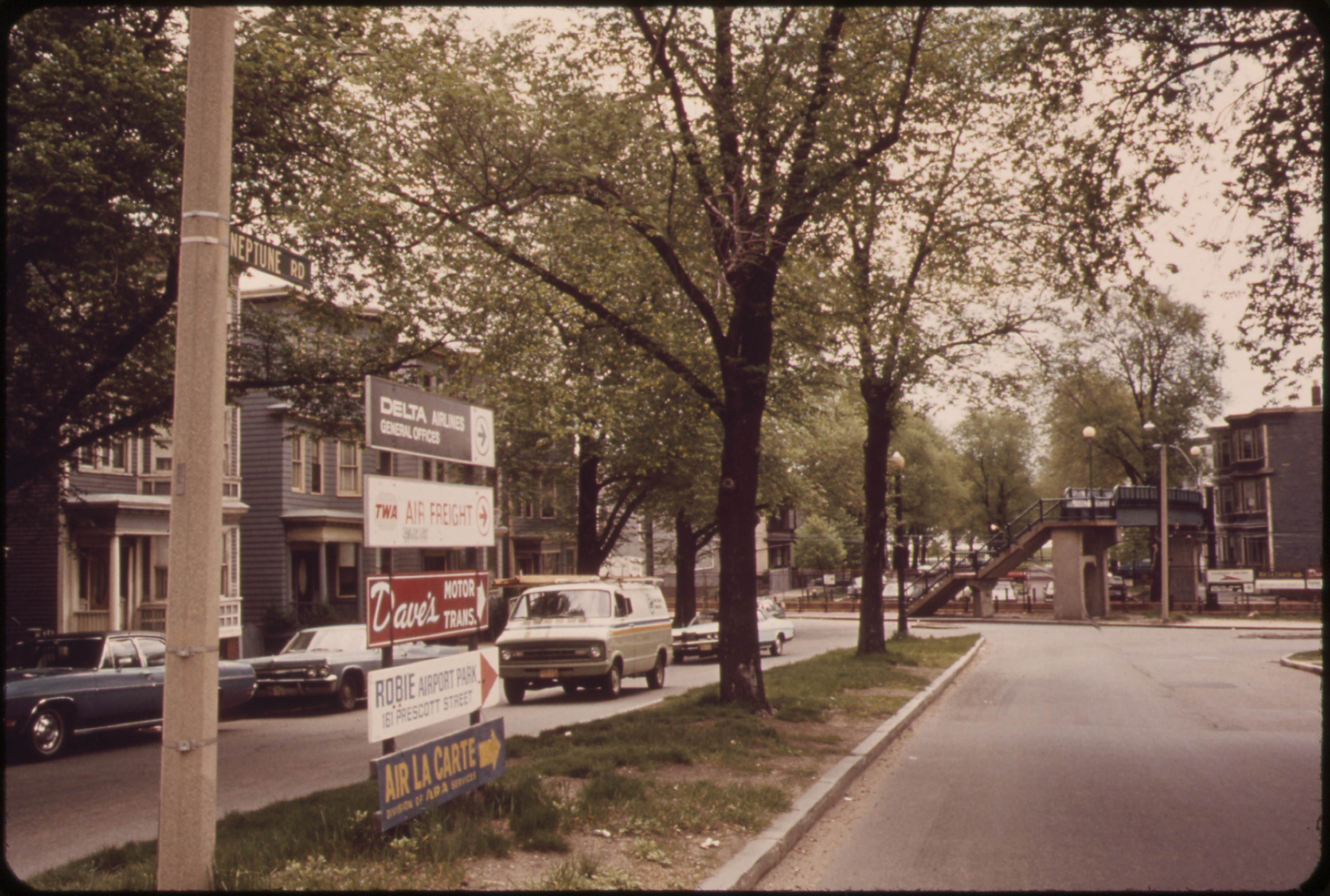
Neptune Road - May 1973

Neptune Road once was a residential street that also served as the entrance to Frederick Law Olmsted's Wood Island Park, a 47-acre waterfront park designed by Olmsted in the 19th century. An elegant tree-lined road with center islands, The Boston Globe referred to the street as a “miniature Commonwealth Avenue”. The expansion of Logan Airport in the late 1960s and early 1970s displaced families along Neptune Road, which is now used for warehouses and rental car property. As the airport expanded, planes flew in low over the residential blocks and conflicts with airport officials escalated. Wood Island Park was leveled early one morning in 1967. On April 23, 1969, 35 workmen with 35 chain saws toppled 35 elms along the road.

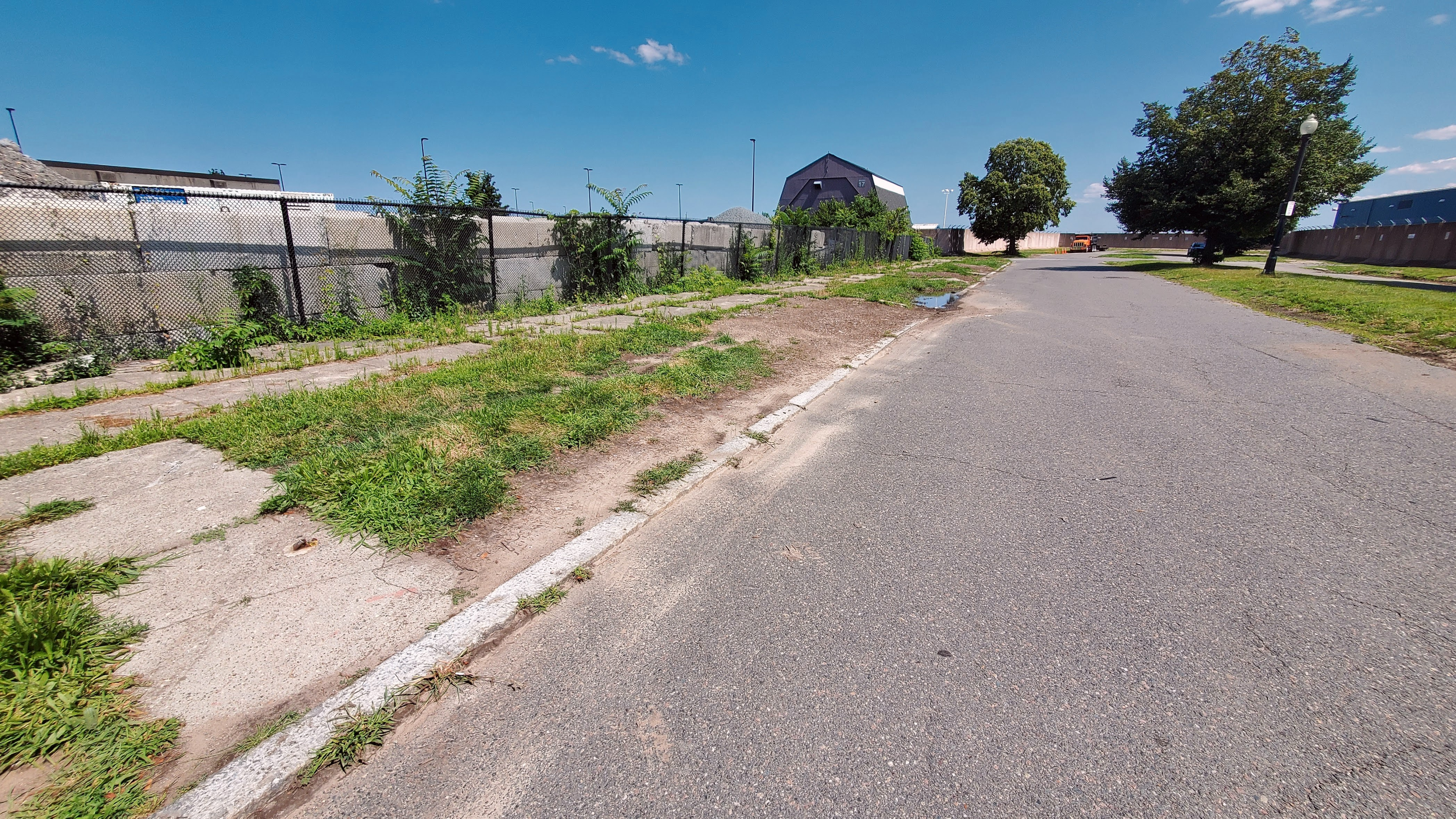
Former sidewalk remains in 2023

The Massachusetts Port Authority, under the reign of then-director and later Governor of Massachusetts Edward J. King, seized by eminent domain some 720 feet (220 m) of the street, and evicted families with the help of US Marshals.

The airport has since implemented four "airport edge buffers" which include parks and greenery. Some of Boston's last surviving elm trees are still located on Neptune Road, resisting the Dutch elm disease that have felled most of the Boston-area elms in the 20th century.

== See also ==
- East Boston
- Logan International Airport
- Massachusetts Port Authority

== Image gallery ==
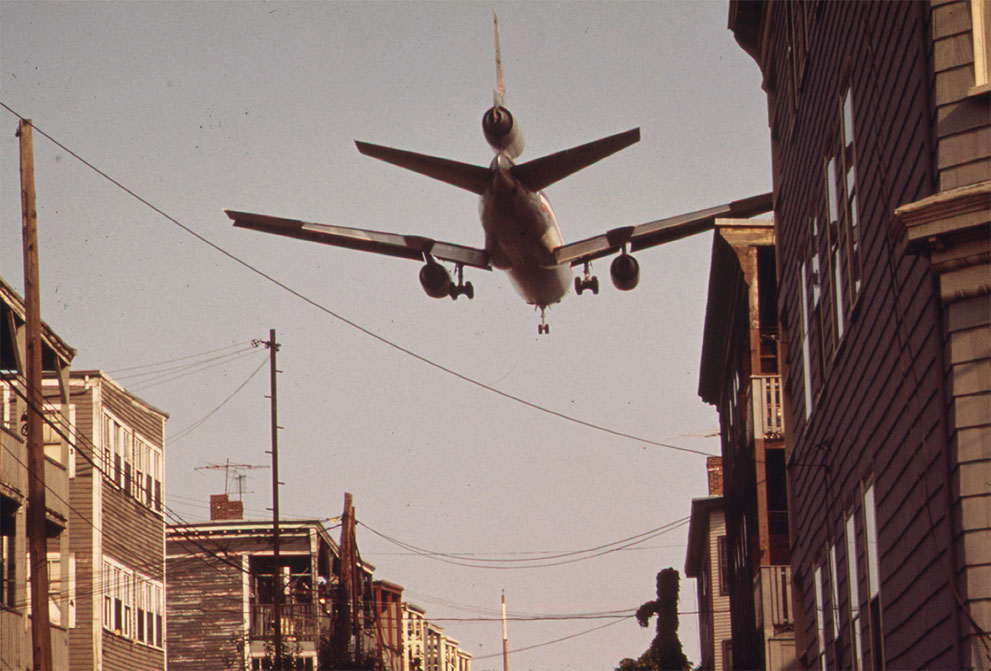
An American Airlines DC-10 comes in for landing at Logan International Airport over Neptune Road in East Boston in May, 1973.

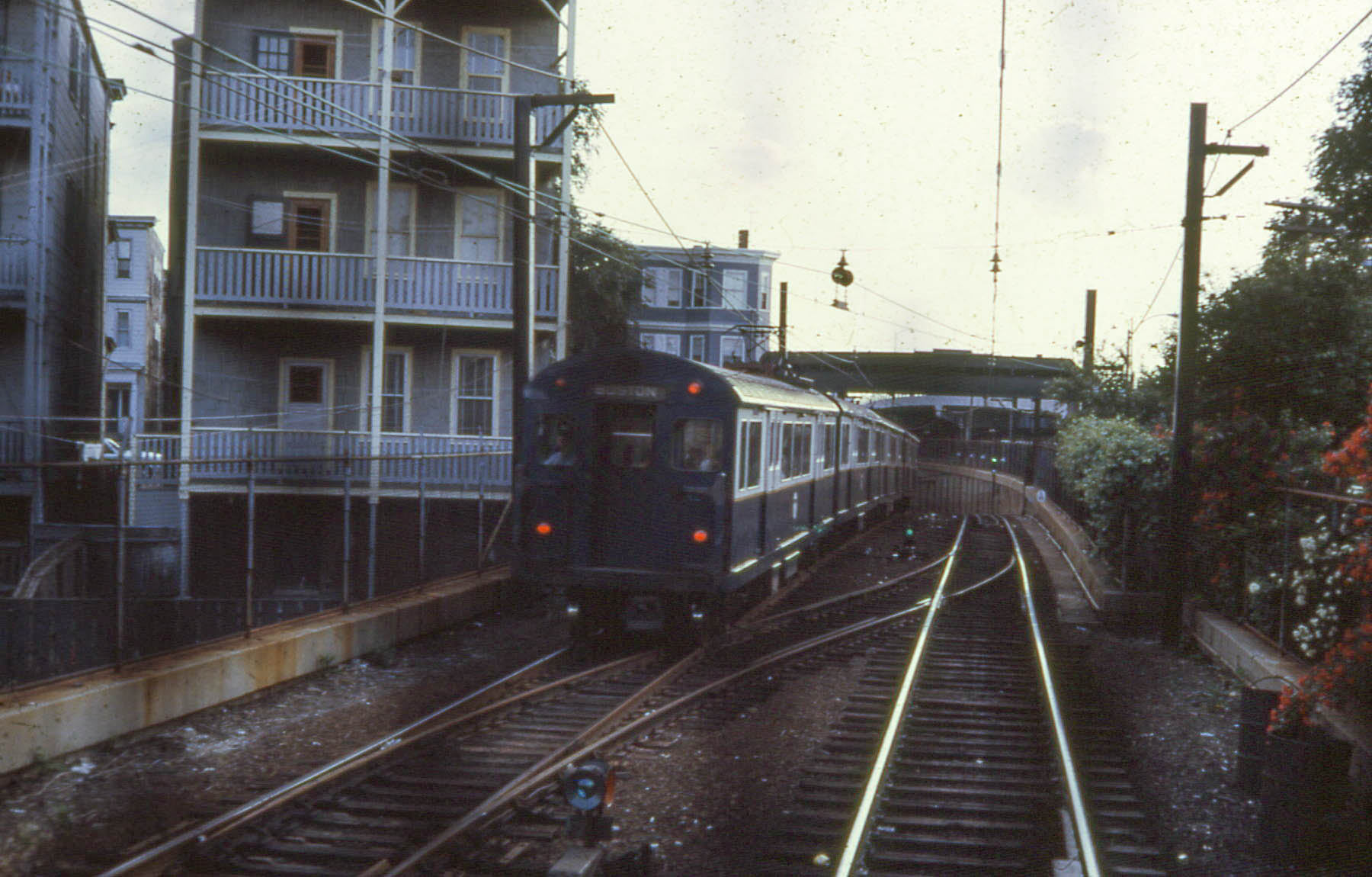
An outbound Blue Line train (erroneously signed as "Boston") passes Neptune Road in 1967.

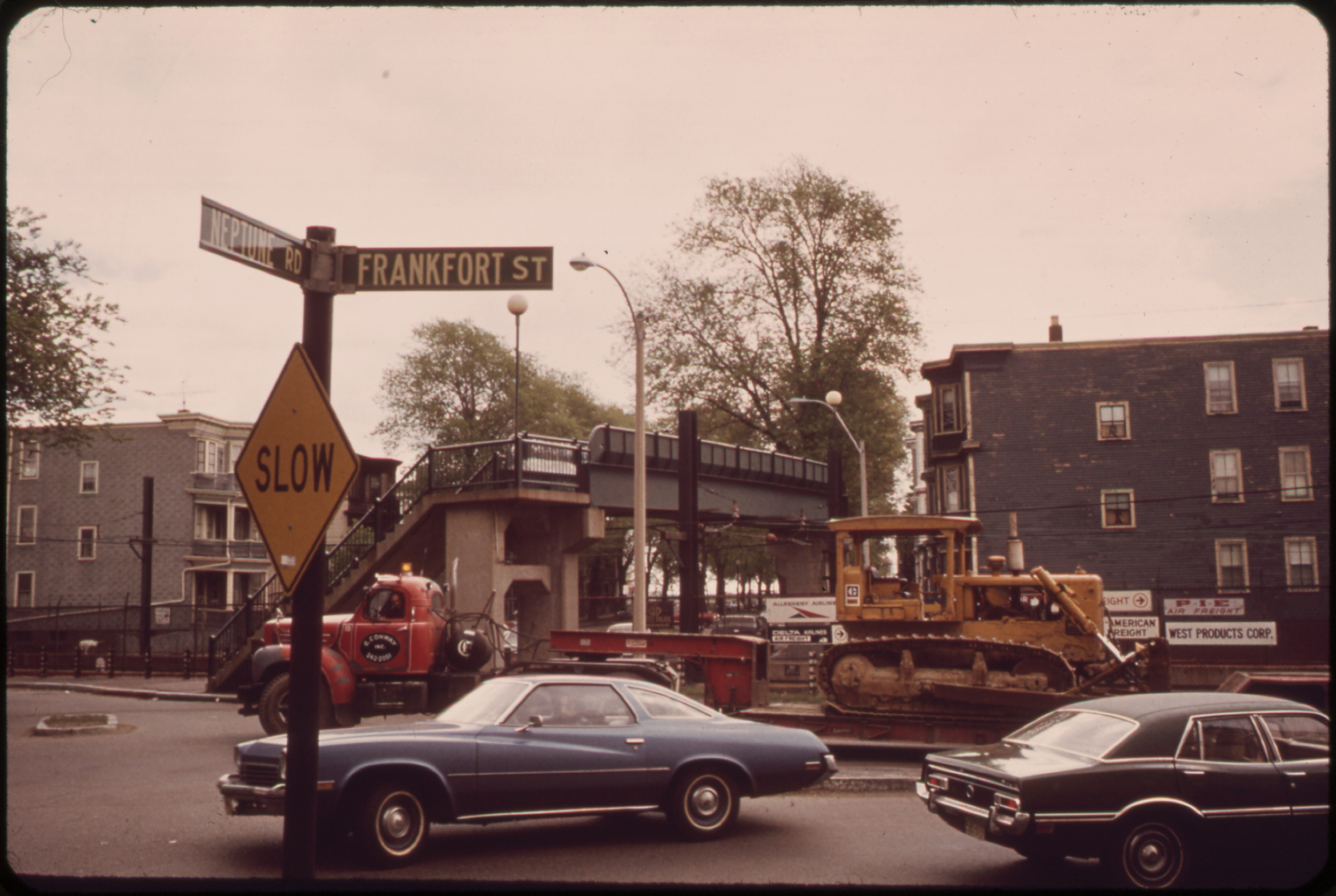
Neptune Road and Frankfort Street. (May 1973)

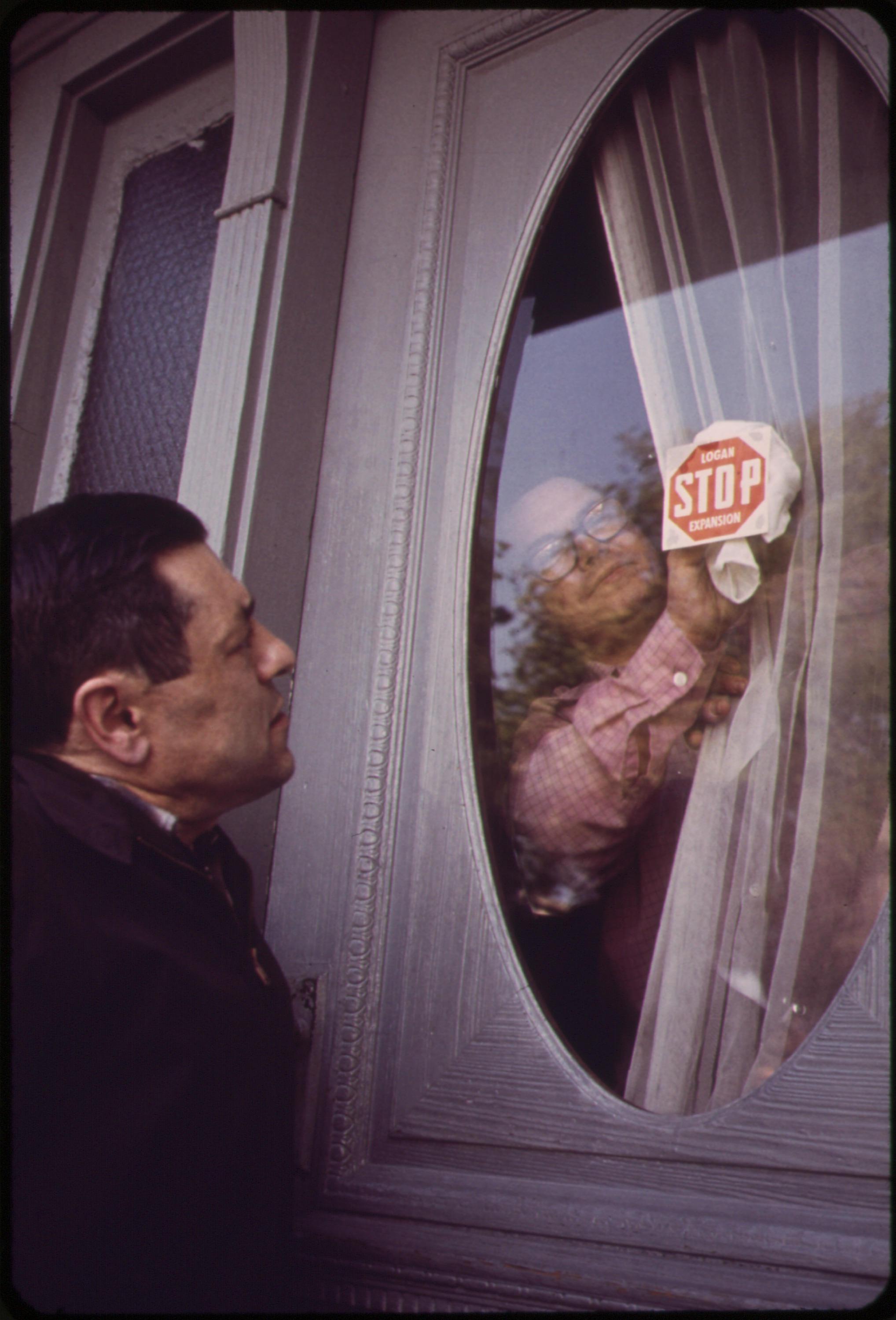
Anthony Bruno affixes a protest sticker to the front door of his Neptune Road House while Joseph Porzio looks on. (May 1973)

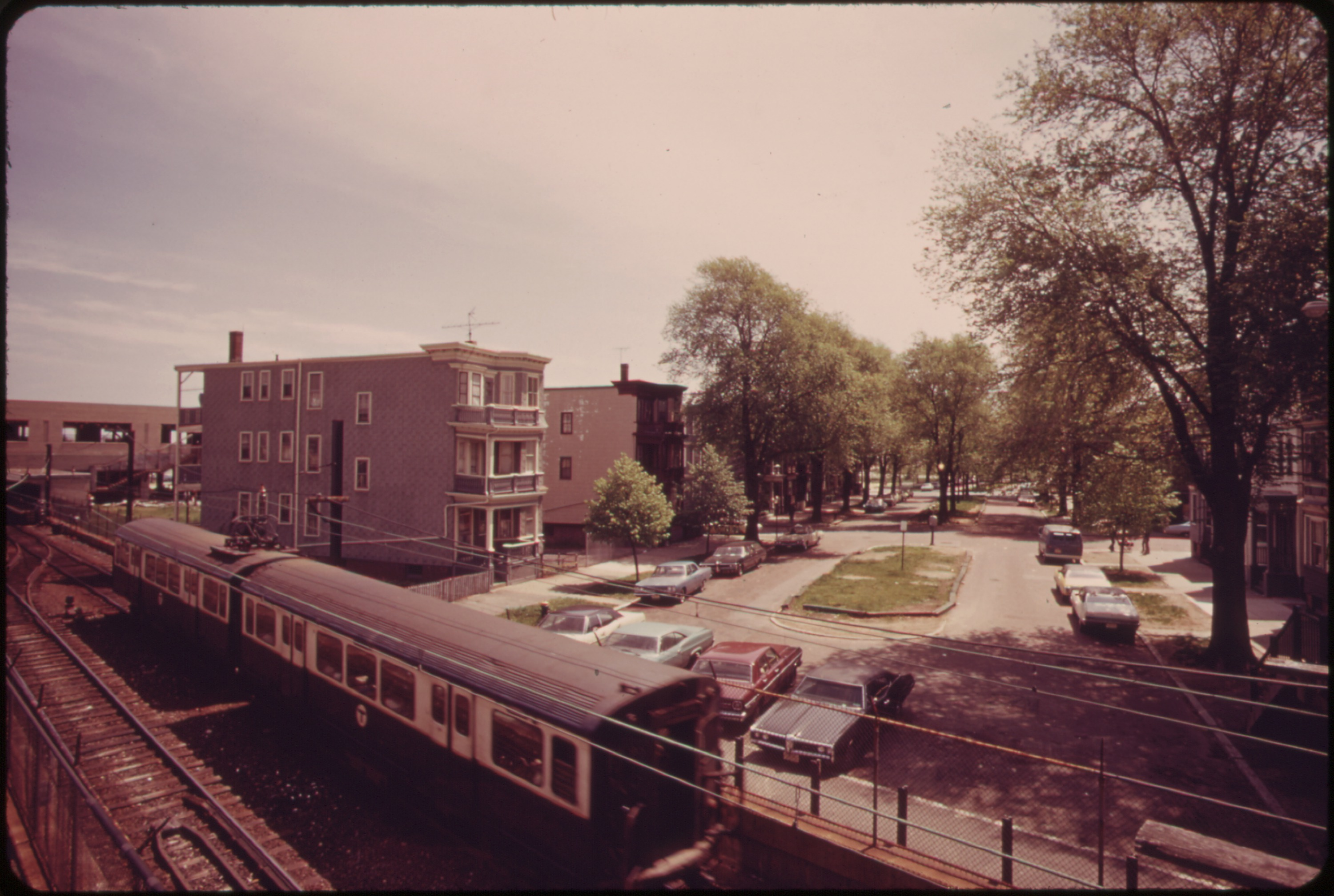
MBTA tracks cut across Neptune Road. (May 1973)

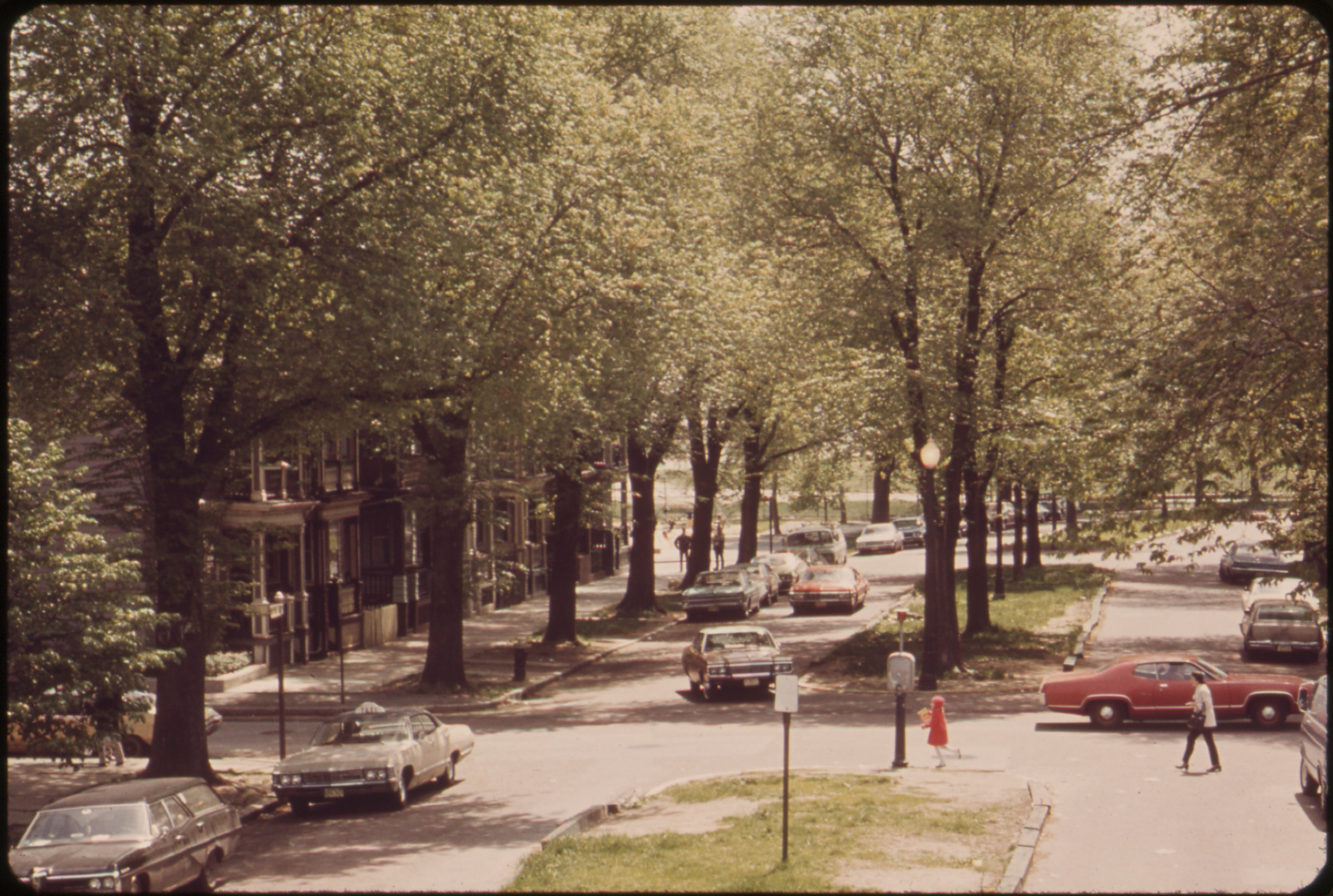
Once Neptune Road led to Wood Island Park and the sea. Now it is bounded by a fence and the Logan Airport runway area. (May 1973)

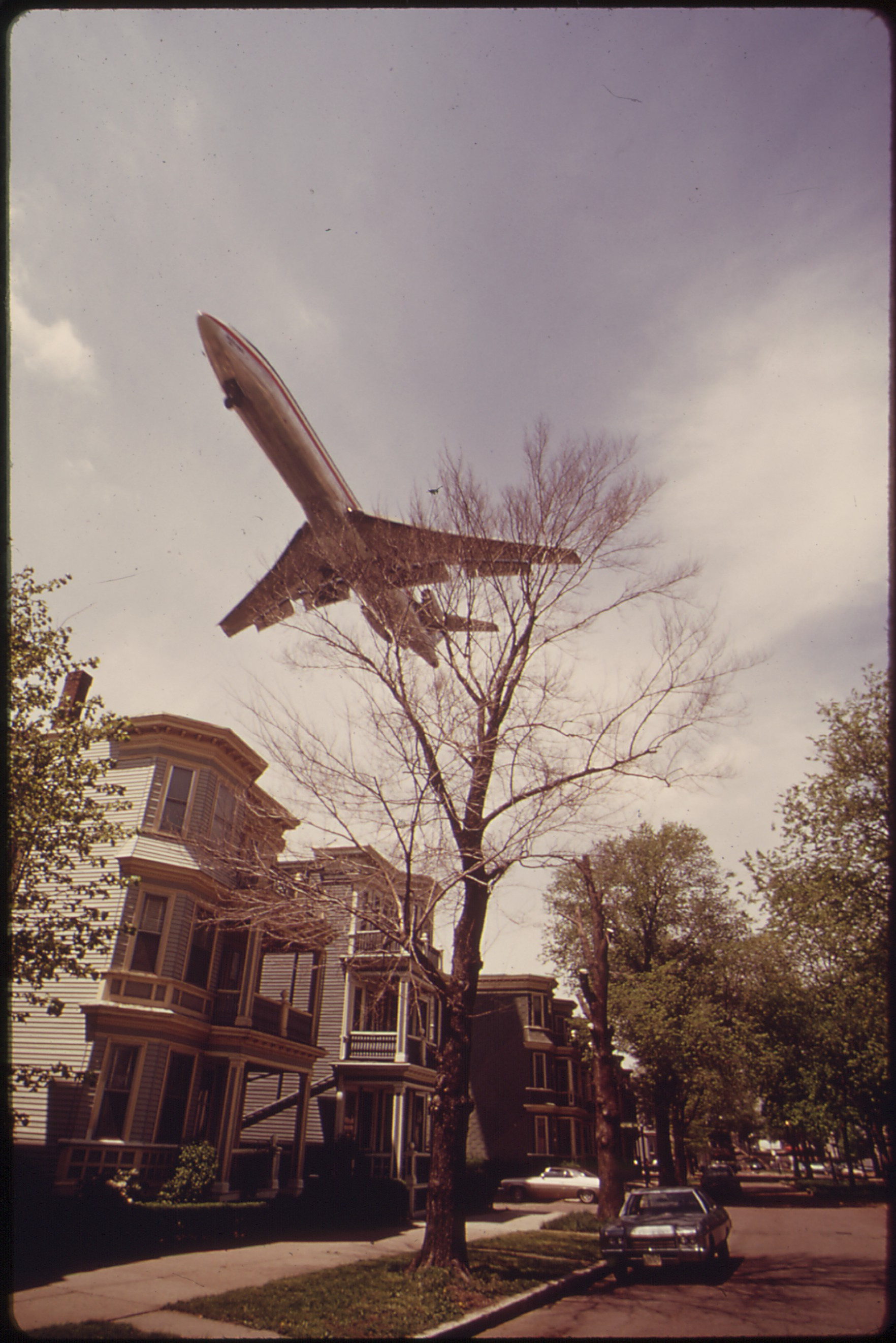
Jet zooms over southwestern side of Neptune Road. (May 1973)
