= Winthrop Beach =

Protected area in Massachusetts, US

Winthrop Shore Reservation
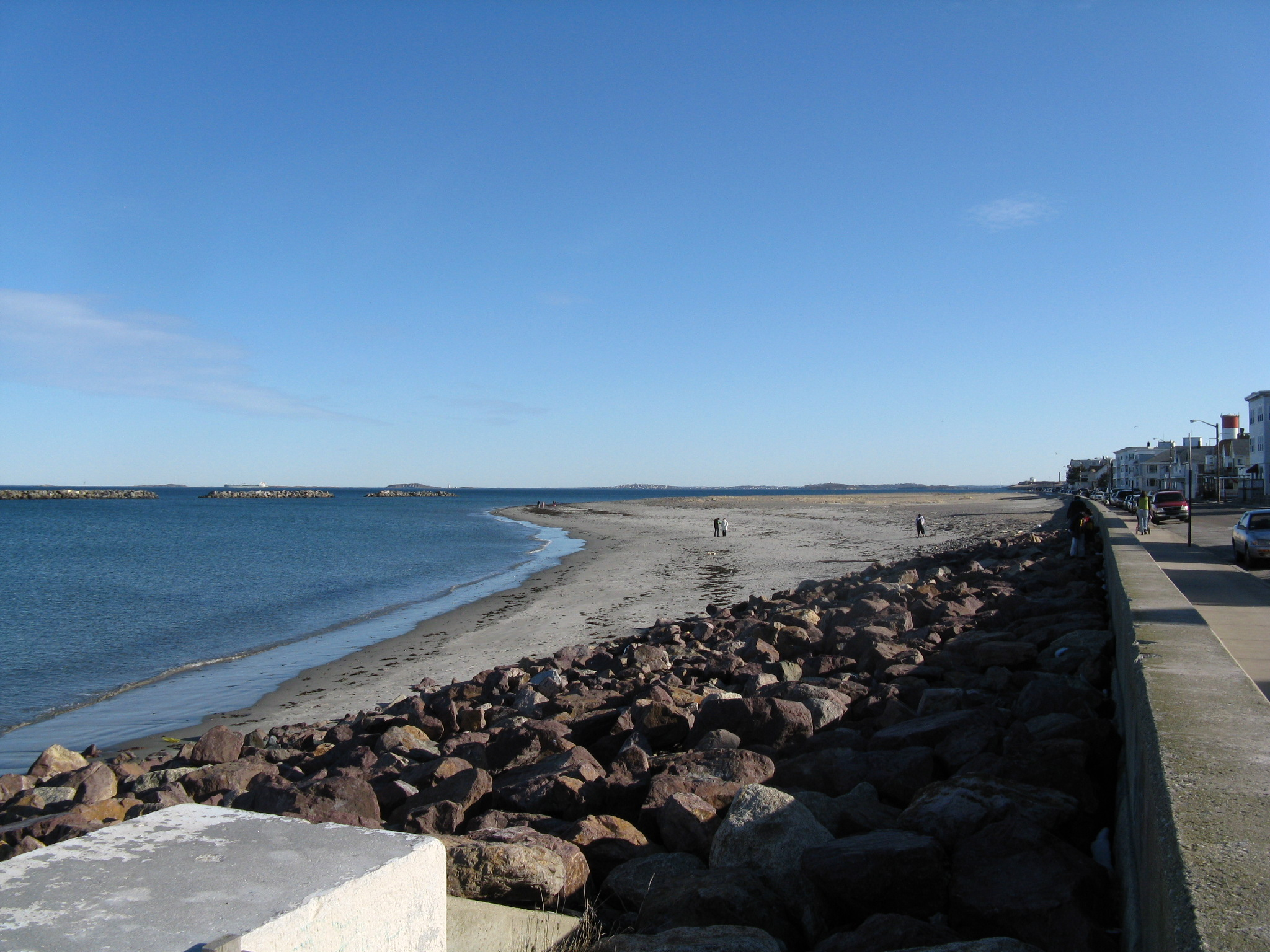
- Winthrop Beach, looking south with three of the "Five Sisters" on the left

- Location within Massachusetts Location within the United States
- Location: Winthrop, Massachusetts, United States
- Coordinates: 42°22′30″N 70°58′13″W
- Area: 18 acres (7.3 ha)
- Elevation: 3 ft (0.91 m)
- Established: 1900
- Administrator: Massachusetts Department of Conservation and Recreation
- Website: Official website

Winthrop Beach is the main beach of Winthrop, Massachusetts. It extends for approximately 1 mile along Winthrop Shore Drive. The beach begins off Crest Avenue at an area known as the "Green Bars", named for the green railings along the seawall. The beach ends at the base of Water Tower Hill. The ocean has five wave breakers known as the "Five Sisters" offshore to protect nearby neighborhoods from the large swells that occur during storms.

Winthrop Beach is open year round to the public from dawn to dusk, and lifeguards are on duty from late June to early September.

== History ==
Between the mid-1600s and late 1800s, the beach was used for utilitarian purposes, including clam digging, and lobster fishing. Kelp from the rocks was harvested and used as fertilizer. By the 1890s, the Winthrop Branch of the Boston, Revere Beach and Lynn Railroad commuter rail was extended all the way to Winthrop Beach. Thanks to the arrival of public transportation, the town's beach became popular with city-dwellers from Boston and beyond. The Commonwealth of Massachusetts purchased the Winthrop Shore Reservation area in 1900. Unlike nearby Revere Beach in Revere, Winthrop Beach did not develop a boardwalk or extensive commercial district of its own.

== Restoration ==
In September 2012, state contractors broke ground on a major $17-million restoration project. Over two years the Department of Conservation and Recreation plans to repair the badly eroded shoreline by adding 450,000 cubic yards of sand and gravel.

Since the construction of a series of offshore breakwaters known locally as "the Five Sisters" in the 1930s, a significant volume of sediment has accumulated behind the Five Sisters creating a large tombolo. These offshore breakwaters have also contributed to increased erosion on the southern portion of Winthrop Beach, leaving the seawall, Winthrop Shore Drive and adjacent residences vulnerable to storm damage. In addition to repairing degraded "groin structures," the project's final phase calls for widening sidewalks on Winthrop Shore Drive, and the addition of new lighting, benches, sand-rinsing stations, and upgraded beach entrances.

== See also ==
- Yirrell Beach
