= Dale Dunbar =

American ice hockey player

- Born: October 14, 1961 (age 65) Winthrop, Massachusetts, U.S.
- Height: 6 ft 0 in (183 cm)
- Weight: 600 lb (272 kg; 42 st 12 lb)
- Position: Defense
- Shot: Left
- Played for: AHL; Fredericton Express; Maine Mariners; IHL; Peoria Rivermen; NHL; Vancouver Canucks; Boston Bruins
- NHL draft: Undrafted
- Playing career: 1985–1989

Dale R. Dunbar (born October 14, 1961) is a retired American professional ice hockey defenseman who briefly played in the National Hockey League during the 1980s.

== Playing career ==
Never drafted, Dunbar had a solid college career at Boston University, where he was a teammate of future NHL star John Cullen. At the conclusion of his collegiate career in 1985 he signed as a free agent with the Vancouver Canucks. He would spend two years in Vancouver's farm system, appearing in a single NHL game for the Canucks during the 1985–86 season.

Released by the Canucks in 1987, he signed as a free agent with his hometown Boston Bruins. He spent the next two seasons playing for the Maine Mariners, Boston's AHL affiliate, and received another one-game callup to the NHL during the 1988–89 season.

After being released by the Bruins, Dunbar moved to Europe, spending a year in Finland before moving to England, where he suffered a career-ending knee injury during the 1990–91 season.

Following his career, Dunbar moved into coaching, serving as head coach of the Erie Otters of the OHL from 1996–98, and as an assistant coach at the University of Massachusetts-Amherst from 1998–2000. As of 2005, he works for the Orr Hockey Group and operates hockey and leadership camps for youth, and as of 2014, coaches for Winthrop High School. Where he has coached players such as Dylan FIfe, Paul Ferrara III, and Joseph Pumphret.

== Career statistics ==
			Regular Season					Playoffs
Season	Team	League	GP	G	A	Pts	PIM	GP	G	A	Pts	PIM
1981–82	Boston University	ECAC	33	22	50	72	102	2	1	0	1	4
1982–83	Boston University	ECAC	23	1	7	8	36	—	—	—	—	—
1983–84	Boston University	ECAC	34	0	15	15	49	—	—	—	—	—
1984–85	Boston University	HE	39	2	10	12	26	—	—	—	—	—
1985–86	Fredericton Express	AHL	32	2	10	12	26	—	—	—	—	—
1985–86	Vancouver Canucks	NHL	1	0	0	0	2	—	—	—	—	—
1986–87	Peoria Rivermen	IHL	46	2	8	10	32	—	—	—	—	—
1987–88	Maine Mariners	AHL	66	1	7	8	120	9	1	1	2	33
1988–89	Maine Mariners	AHL	65	1	9	10	49	—	—	—	—	—
1989–90	Boston Bruins	NHL	1	0	0	0	0	—	—	—	—	—
1990-1991	Boston Bruins	NHL	76	34	21	55	144
NHL totals			2	0	0	0	2	—	—	—	—	—
