= Jay M. Harris =

American scholar

- Education: Columbia University (BA, MA, PhD); Jewish Theological Seminary of America (MA)
- Scientific career
- Fields: Jewish studies
- Institutions: Harvard University

Jay M. Harris is an American scholar and Harry Austryn Wolfson Professor of Jewish Studies at Harvard University. He is known for his works on Jewish history.

== Education ==
Harris received his bachelor's, master's, and doctoral degrees from Columbia University. He also obtained a master's degree from the Jewish Theological Seminary of America.

== Career ==
Harris taught at Columbia, the Jewish Theological Seminary, Princeton University, and the University of Pennsylvania, before joining the Harvard faculty in 1989. He was named Harris K. Weston Associate Professor of the Humanities in 1991 and the Harry Austryn Wolfson Professor of Jewish Studies in 1994.

Harris served as co-master of Cabot House. From 2000 to 2004, Harris was also editor of the AJS Review.

In 2008, Harris was named dean of undergraduate education at Harvard College before stepping down in 2017. Harris was the first to hold the position of Dean of Undergraduate Education in its current form, following a restructuring of the College's leadership in 2003 that consolidated the role under the Dean of the College.

During his tenure, he oversaw the introduction of the Program in General Education in 2009 and its subsequent revision, led the development of Harvard's first Honor Code, which came into effect in 2015, and spearheaded initiatives including the Classroom to Table program and an expansion of Freshman Seminar offerings.

His tenure was also marked by two major academic dishonesty scandals. The first involved allegations that nearly half the students in Government 1310 had inappropriately collaborated on a take-home final examination in 2012. The second concerned more than ten percent of enrollees in Computer Science 50 in fall 2016, prompting Harris to attend course sessions and urge students not to cheat.
