= Winthrop, Massachusetts =

- City
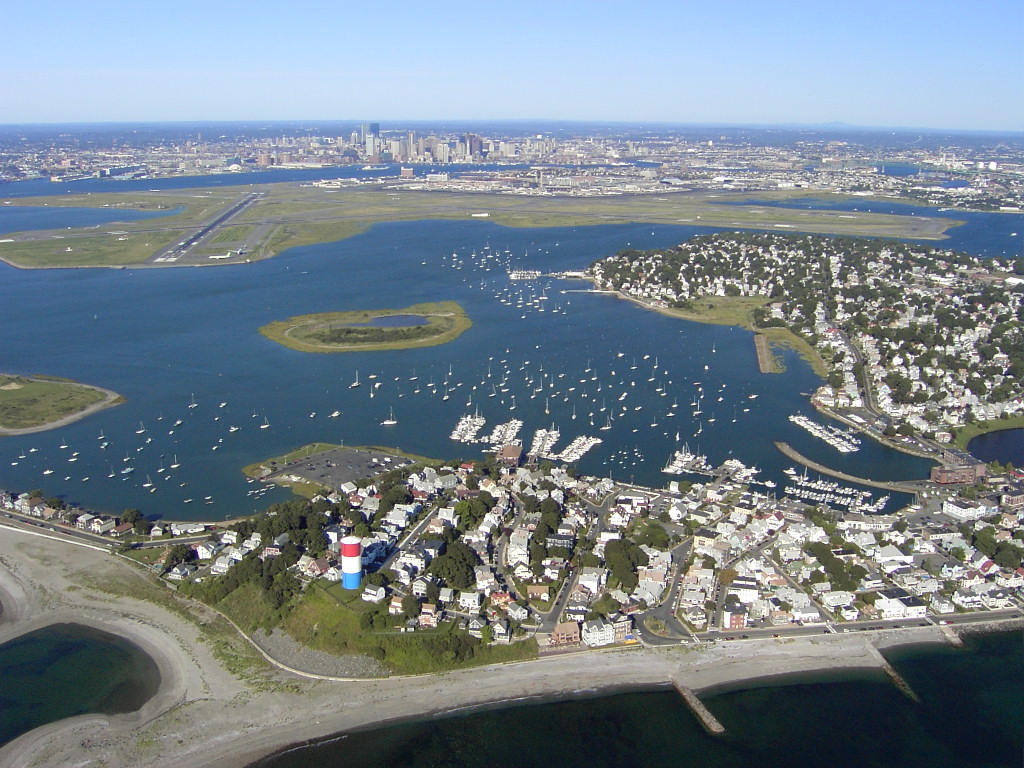
- Aerial view of Winthrop and Boston, Massachusetts skyscrapers

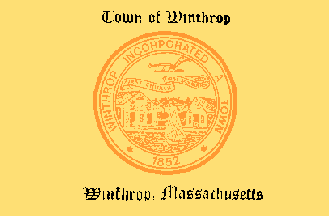
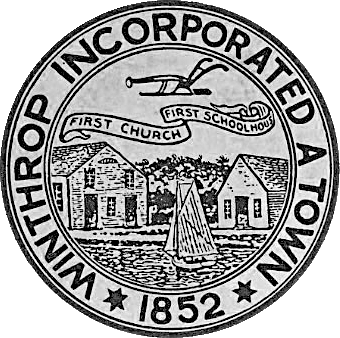
- Flag Seal
- Nickname: Winthrop-by-the-Sea
- Motto: "Where the North Shore begins"
- Location in Suffolk County and the state of Massachusetts

- Location in the United States
- Coordinates: 42°22′30″N 70°59′00″W
- Country: United States
- State: Massachusetts
- County: Suffolk
- Settled: 1630
- Incorporated: 1852

Government
  - Type: Council-manager
  - Council President: James Letterie
  - Town Manager: Anthony Marino

Area
  - Total: 8.32 sq mi (21.55 km^{2})
  - Land: 1.99 sq mi (5.16 km^{2})
  - Water: 6.33 sq mi (16.39 km^{2})
- Elevation: 36 ft (11 m)

Population (2020)
  - Total: 19,316
  - Density: 12,084/sq mi (4,665.7/km^{2})
- Demonym: Winthropian
- Time zone: UTC-5 (Eastern)
  - Summer (DST): UTC-4 (Eastern)
- ZIP Code: 02152
- Area code: 617 / 857
- FIPS code: 25-80930
- GNIS feature ID: 0618335
- Website: winthropma.gov

Winthrop is a city in Suffolk County, Massachusetts, United States. The population was 19,316 at the 2020 census. Winthrop is an ocean-side suburban town in Greater Boston situated at the north entrance to the Boston Harbor, geographically nearby to the Logan International Airport. It is located on a peninsula, 1.6 square miles (4.2 km^{2}) in area, connected to the city of Revere, Massachusetts by a narrow isthmus and to Boston by a bridge over the harbor inlet to the Belle Isle Marsh Reservation in the neighborhood of East Boston. It is also connected by an isthmus to Deer Island.

Settled in 1630, Winthrop is one of the oldest communities in the United States. It is also one of the smallest and most densely populated municipalities in Massachusetts. It is one of the four municipalities that comprise Suffolk County (the others are Boston, Revere, and Chelsea). It is the southernmost part of the North Shore area, with a 7-mile (11 km) shoreline that provides views of the Atlantic Ocean to the east and of the Boston skyline to the west.

In 2005, the Town of Winthrop voted to change its governance from a representative town meeting adopted in 1920 to a council-manager form of government. Under Massachusetts law, as of 2006 when the new Town Charter took effect, Winthrop became de jure a city. However, it is one of thirteen cities in Massachusetts that chose to remain known as a 'town.'

== History ==
Winthrop was settled in 1630 by English Puritan colonists as "Pullen Poynt" (Pulling Point), so named because the tides made hard pulling for boatmen. The present town is named after John Winthrop (1587–1649), second governor of the Massachusetts Bay Colony and an English Puritan leader. On April 8, 1630, Winthrop departed from the Isle of Wight, England on the ship Arbella, arriving in Salem in June where he was met by John Endecott, the first governor of the colony. John Winthrop served as governor for twelve of the colony's first twenty years of existence. It was he who decided to base the colony at the Shawmut Peninsula, where he and other colonists founded what is now the City of Boston.

Originally part of an area called Winnisimmet by the native Massachusett tribe, Pullen Poynt was annexed by the Town of Boston in 1632 and was used as a grazing area. In 1637, it was divided into fifteen parcels of land that were given by Governor Winthrop to prominent men in Boston with the stipulation that each must erect a building on his land within two years. Few, if any, of these men ever lived on these parcels of land, but their farms prospered. One of these early houses, the Deane Winthrop House, was the home of Governor Winthrop's youngest son, Deane Winthrop, who lived there until his death in 1704. This house is still standing and is also the oldest continually occupied home in the United States. Although occupied, it is also open to the public at select times. The house is maintained by the Winthrop Improvement and Historical Association.

In 1739, what is now Chelsea, Revere, and Winthrop, withdrew from Boston due to governmental control disputes and became the Town of Chelsea. In 1775, residents of the Town of Chelsea played a key role in the Battle of Chelsea Creek of the American Revolutionary War. Again, the desire for more local control resulted in Revere and Winthrop seceding from Chelsea in 1846 to become North Chelsea. Shortly thereafter, in 1852, Winthrop was incorporated as a town in its own right with a Board of Selectmen and Open Town Meeting form of government. In 1920, Winthrop was the second town in the Commonwealth of Massachusetts to apply for and receive a Charter for a Representative Town Meeting, which continued to 2006.

As noted above, Winthrop adopted a home rule charter in 2005 with a council-manager form of government and is no longer governed by a representative town meeting. It is now legally a city, but chooses to be known as a town that has a city form of government. The new Town Charter, which took effect in 2006, was passed in a special election. The Board of Selectmen and Town Meeting were abolished, and legislative powers were vested in an elected Town Council. Executive power, largely ceremonial, resides in the Council President, who is popularly elected. An appointed Town Manager serves as the head of administrative services.

== Geography ==
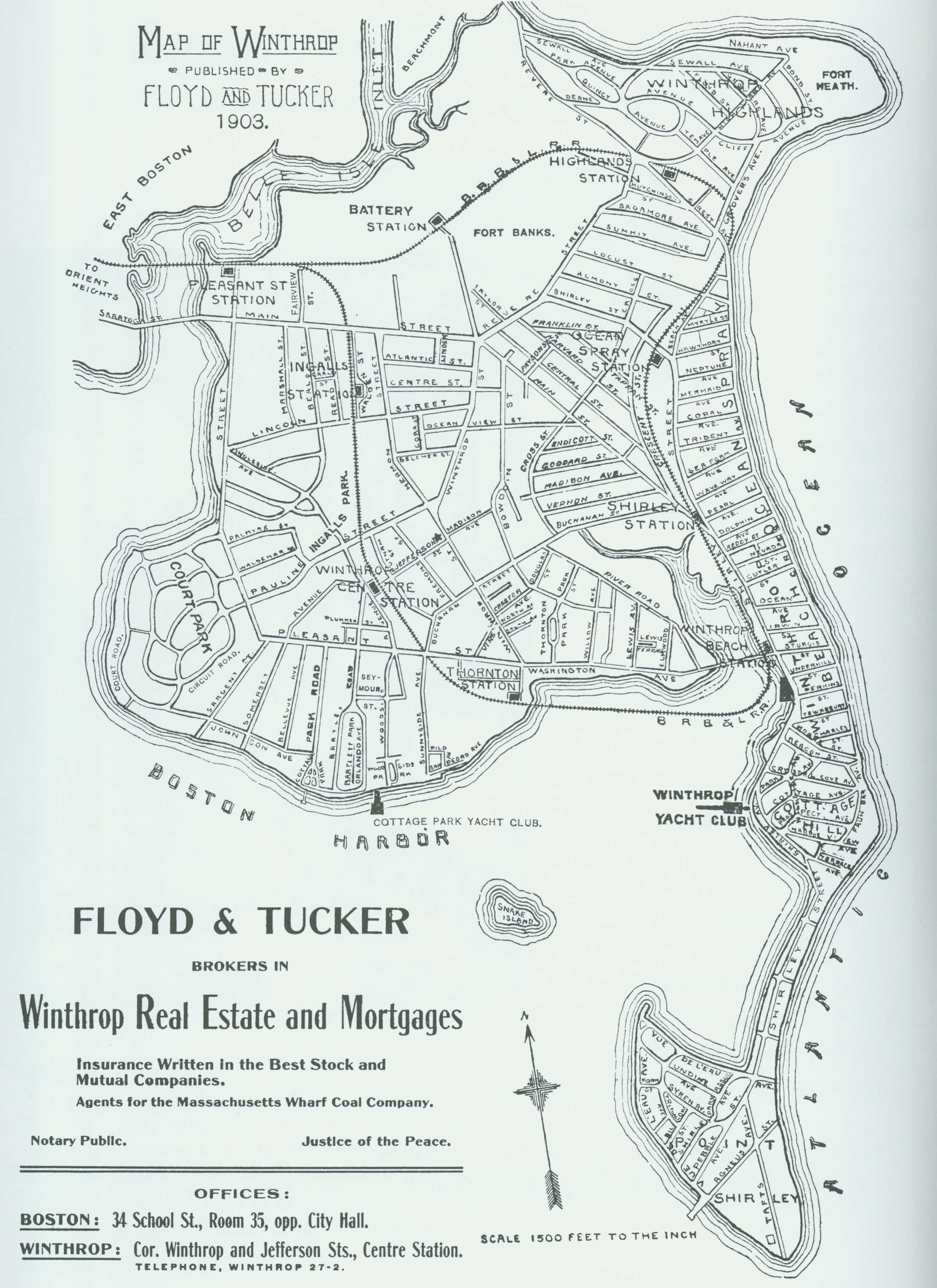
1903 map showing the stations of the former Winthrop Loop of the Boston, Revere Beach and Lynn Railroad

According to the United States Census Bureau, the town has a total area of 8.3 square miles (21.5 km^{2}), of which 2.0 square miles (5.2 km^{2}) is land and 6.3 square miles (16.3 km^{2}) (76.02%) is water. However, according to the Town Government, Winthrop has a land area of just 1.6 square miles (4.1 km^{2}).

Winthrop is connected by land skirting the Belle Isle Marsh Reservation, which is shared across the Belle Isle Inlet with East Boston. The town was originally separated from Deer Island. Although still an island by name, Deer Island has been connected to Winthrop since the former Shirley Gut channel, which once separated the island from the town, was filled in by the New England Hurricane of 1938. The town is considered the northern dividing line between Boston Harbor to its west and Massachusetts Bay to its east.

The town is divided into several neighborhoods with a central downtown area, including Court Park and Cottage Park along the Boston Harbor side of town, and Point Shirley, Cottage Hill, Winthrop Beach, Ocean Spray, and Winthrop Highlands on the Massachusetts Bay side. The town is bordered by Revere to the north, and Boston on the northwest, west, and southeast. The water rights of the town extend to the edge of the county, and border those of Nahant in Essex County. As a result of the expansion of Logan International Airport, part of four of the runways (4L/22R, 4R/22L, 15R/33L, and most of 15L/33R) lies within what was once the water rights of the town. By land, Winthrop is 5.5 miles (8.9 km) from Beacon Hill, the measuring point for all road signs in Massachusetts.

== Demographics ==
Historical population
| Year | Pop. | ±% |
|---|---|---|
| 1860 | 544 | — |
| 1870 | 532 | −2.2% |
| 1880 | 1,043 | +96.1% |
| 1890 | 2,726 | +161.4% |
| 1900 | 6,058 | +122.2% |
| 1910 | 10,132 | +67.2% |
| 1920 | 15,455 | +52.5% |
| 1930 | 16,852 | +9.0% |
| 1940 | 16,768 | −0.5% |
| 1950 | 19,496 | +16.3% |
| 1960 | 20,303 | +4.1% |
| 1970 | 20,335 | +0.2% |
| 1980 | 19,294 | −5.1% |
| 1990 | 18,127 | −6.0% |
| 2000 | 18,303 | +1.0% |
| 2010 | 17,497 | −4.4% |
| 2020 | 19,316 | +10.4% |
| 2024* | 18,739 | −3.0% |
* = population estimate. source= U.S. Decennial Census

As of the census of 2000, there were 18,303 people, 7,843 households, and 4,580 families residing in the town. The population density was 9,208 inhabitants per square mile (3,555/km^{2}). There were 8,067 housing units at an average density of 4,058.5 per square mile (1,567.0/km^{2}). The racial makeup of the town was 94.44% White, 1.68% Black, 1.15% Asian, 0.16% Native American, 0.04% Pacific Islander, 1.36% from other races, and 1.16% of two or more races. Hispanic or Latino people of any race comprised 2.69% of the population.

There were 7,843 households, of which 23.6% had children under the age of 18 living with them, 43.1% were married couples living together, 11.5% had a female householder with no husband present, and 41.6% were non-families. 32.5% of all households were made up of individuals, and 11.9% had someone living alone who was 65 years of age or older. The average household size was 2.3 and the average family size was 2.98.

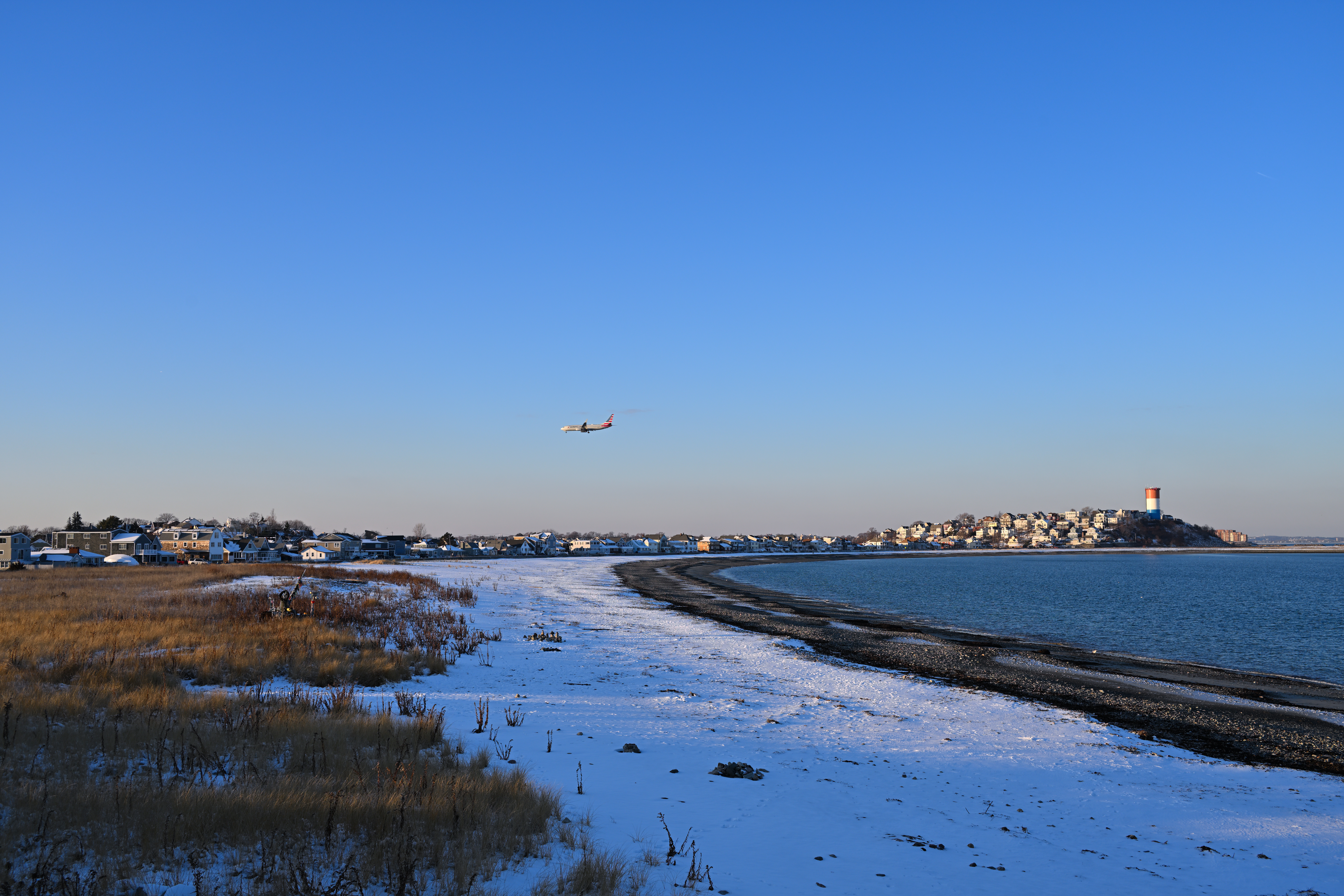
Yirrell Beach in the winter, looking north from Deer Island in 2024

In the town the population was spread out, with 18.6% under the age of 18, 7.3% from 18 to 24, 33.2% from 25 to 44, 24.4% from 45 to 64, and 16.5% who were 65 years of age or older. The median age was 40 years. For every 100 females, there were 88.8 males. For every 100 females age 18 and over, there were 86.3 males.

The median income for a household in the town was $53,122, and the median income for a family was $65,696. Males had a median income of $42,135 versus $36,298 for females. The per capita income for the town was $27,374. About 3.3% of families and 5.5% of the population were below the poverty line, including 4.1% of those under age 18 and 8.0% of those age 65 or over.

== Economy ==
By the mid-1990s, large shopping malls in the nearby North Shore region of Massachusetts, especially Square One Mall in Saugus, began to drain small businesses, though a strong small business community still prevails.

The town is divided into four unique business areas: the Shirley Street Business District, the Highlands District, the center, and Magee's Corner District. In July 2017, Massachusetts Governor Charlie Baker announced a $2.38 million grant to the town to redevelop its Center Business District.

== Arts and culture ==
=== Military forts ===
Winthrop is home to two historic military forts, Fort Banks and Fort Heath. Fort Banks was a United States Coast Artillery fort, which served to defend Boston Harbor from enemy attack from the sea and was built in the 1890s during what is known as the Endicott period, a time in which the coast defenses of the United States were seriously expanded and upgraded with new technology. Fort Heath was built in 1898 also as a Coast Artillery fort. It is now replaced with the Fort Heath Apartment building, Seal Harbor condominia, and a small park on the bluff overlooking the Atlantic Ocean and Revere Beach.

=== Historic places ===
Winthrop has five places on the National Register of Historic Places.

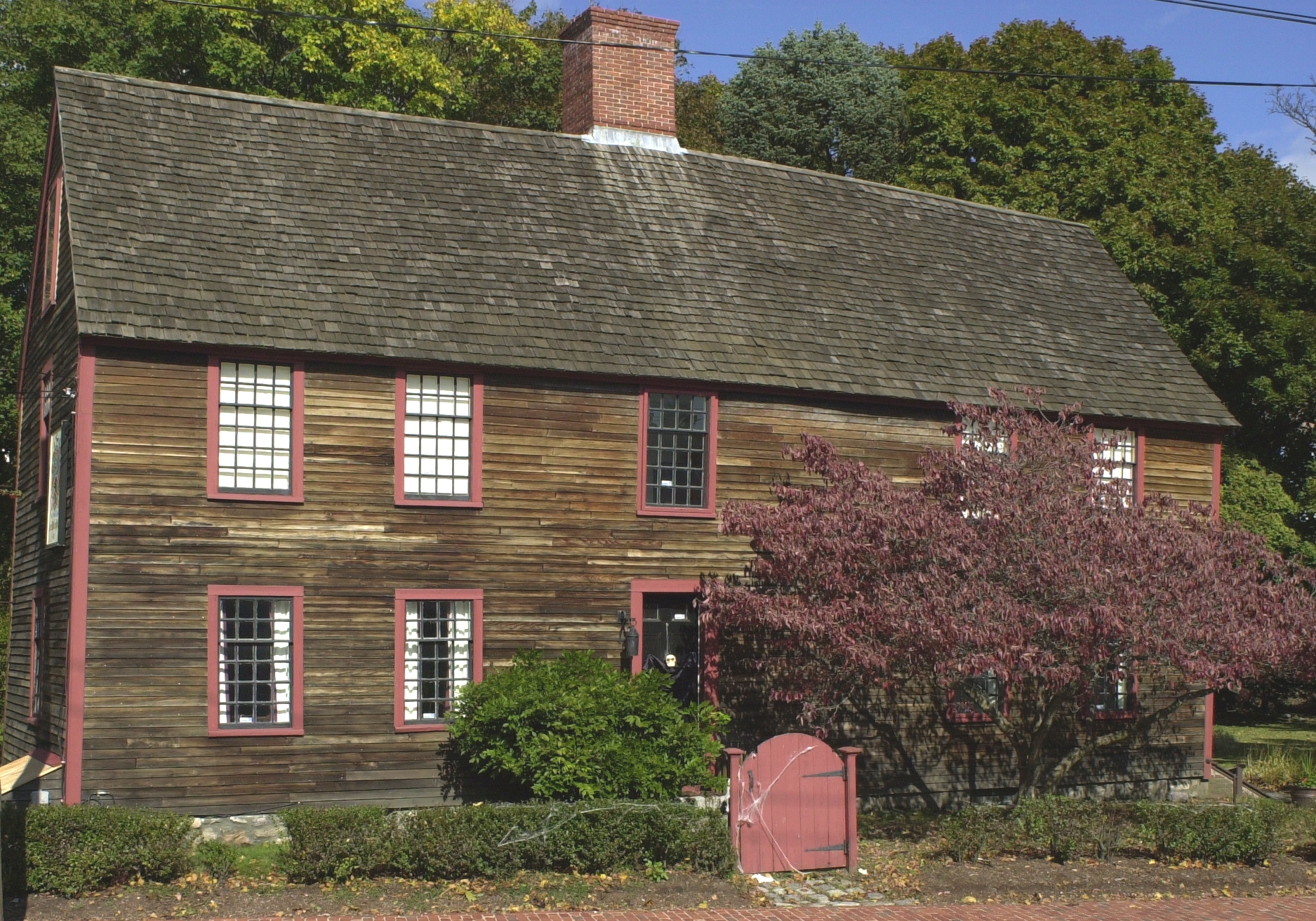
Deane Winthrop House

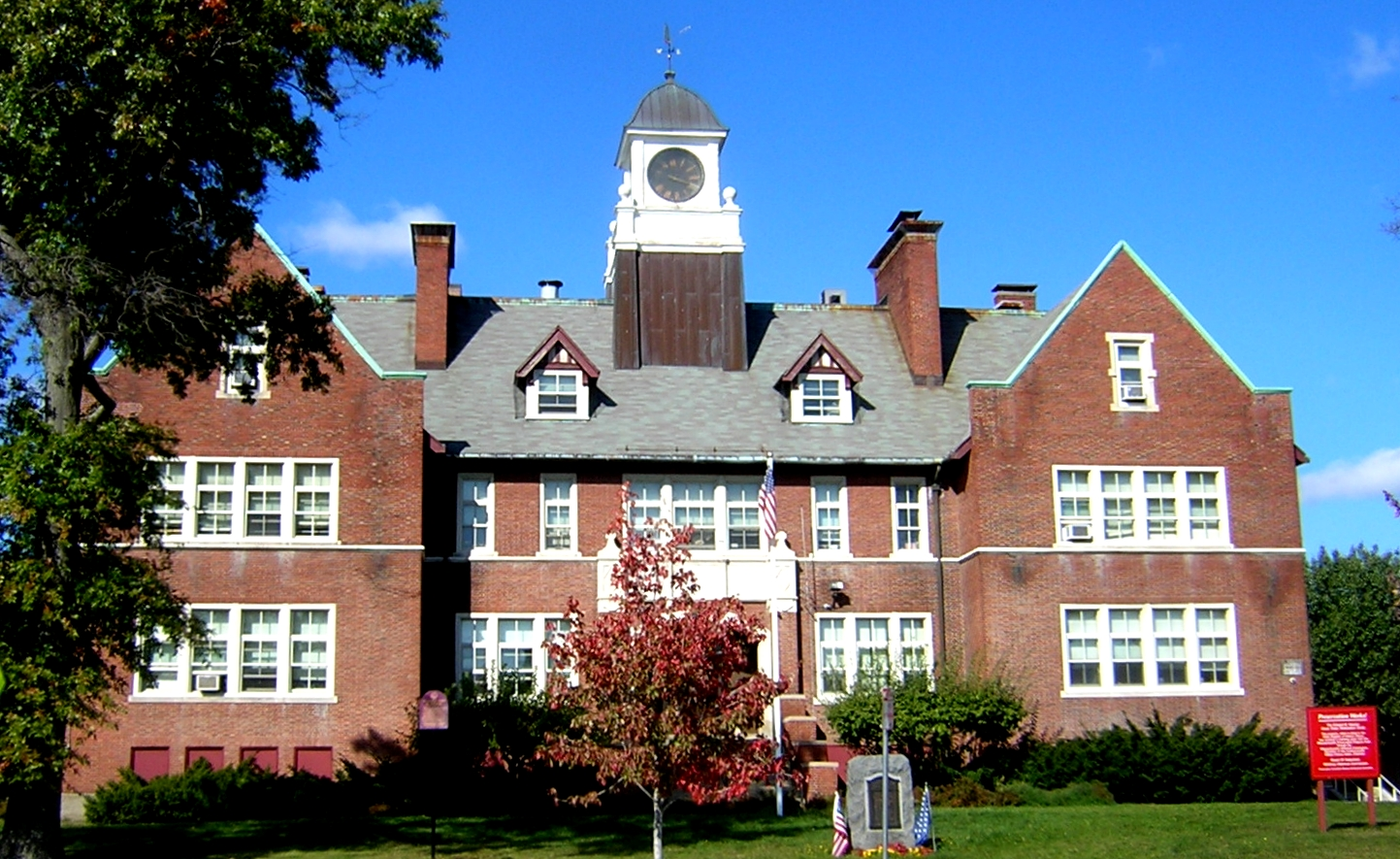
Edward B. Newton School

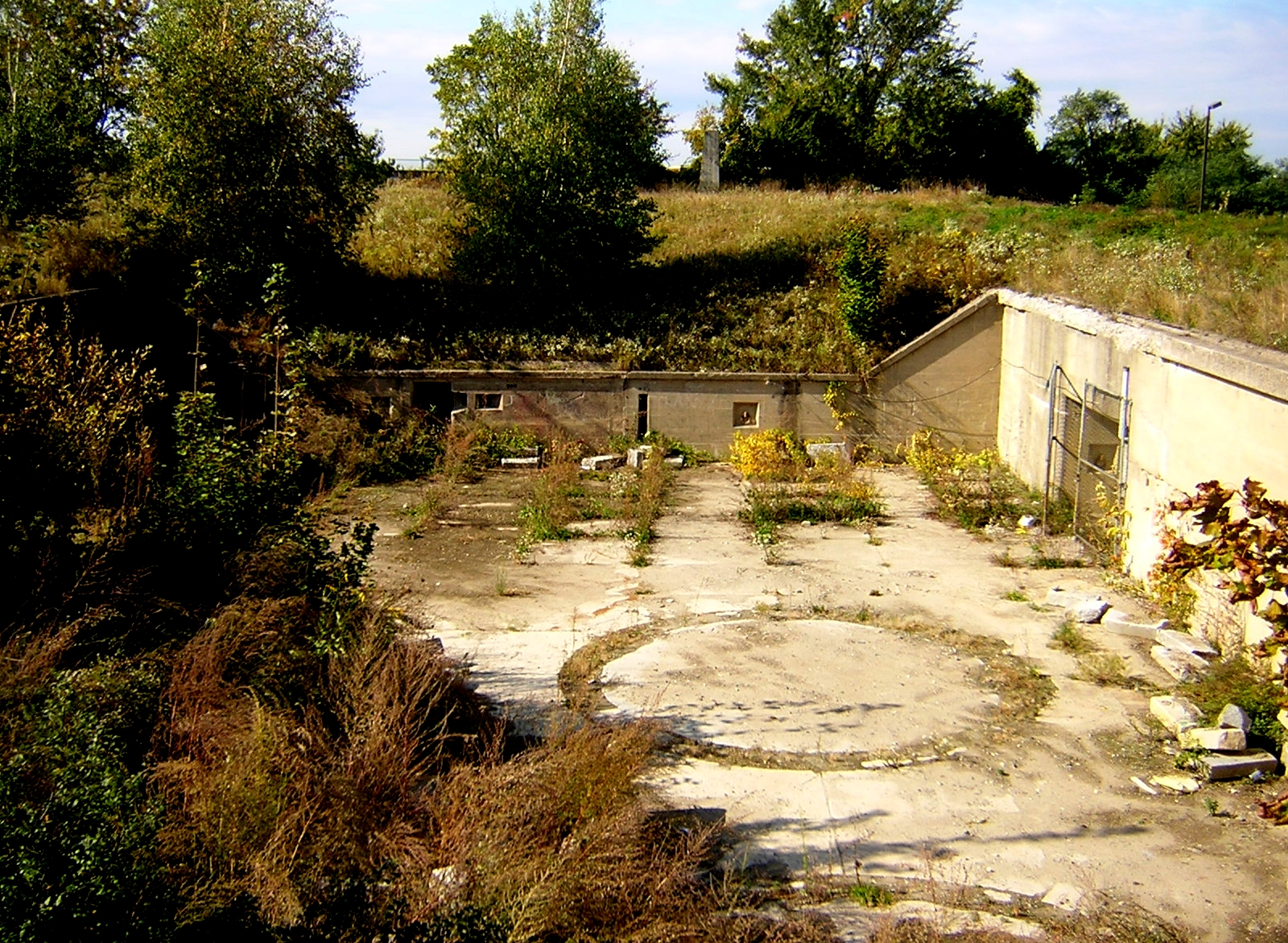
Fort Banks Mortar Battery

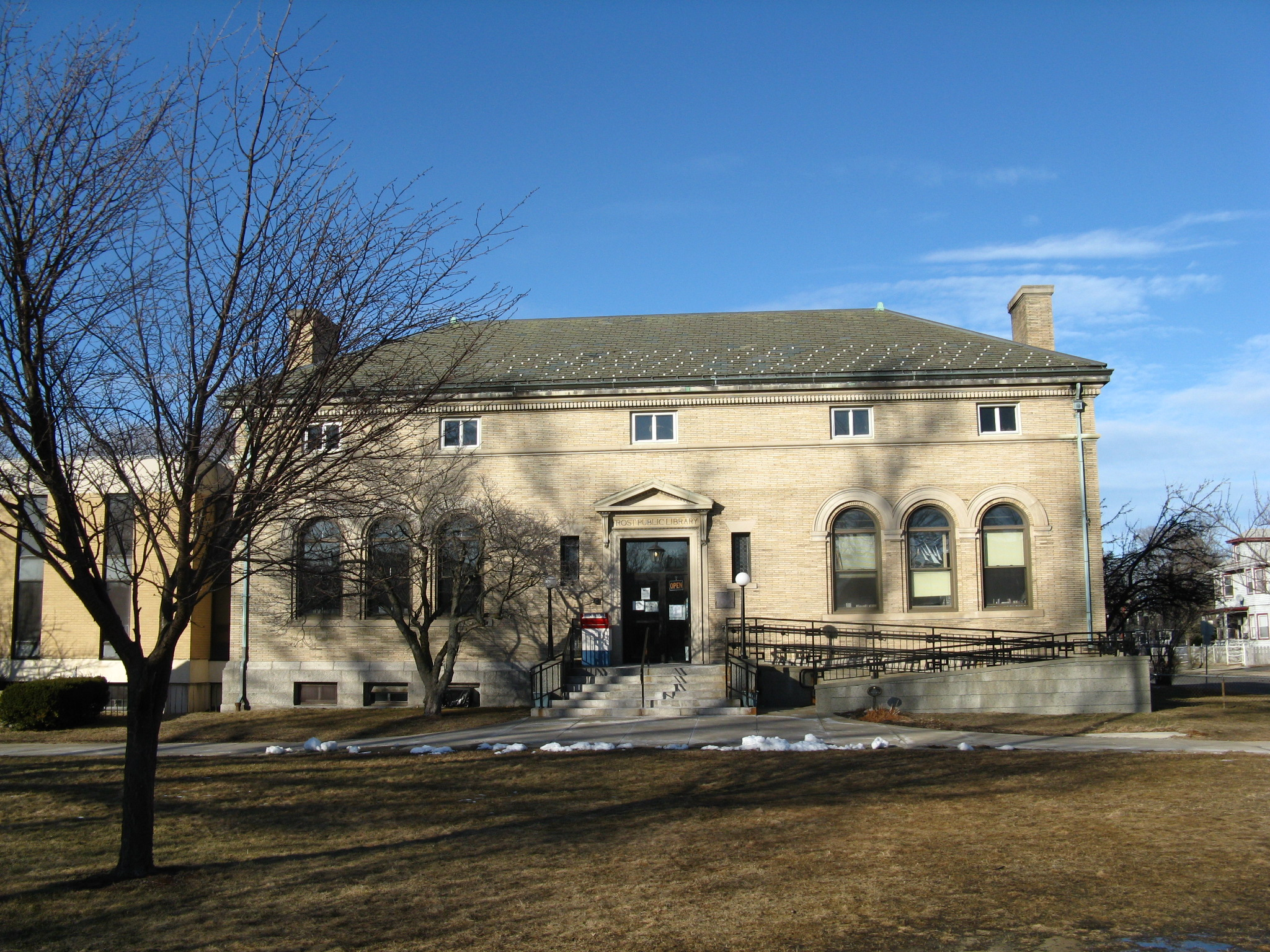
Winthrop Center/Metcalf Square Historic District

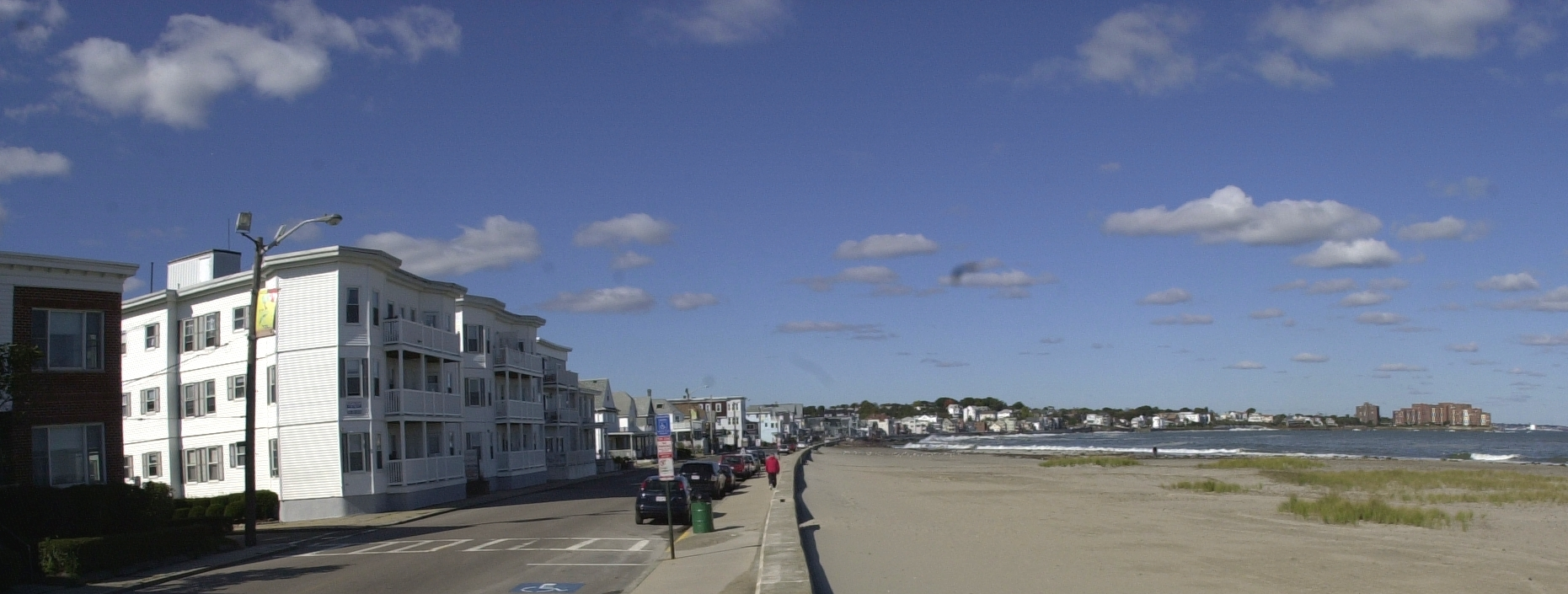
Winthrop Shore Drive

== Parks and recreation ==
Winthrop has numerous beaches due to being surrounded by water. The major beaches are Winthrop Beach and Yirrell Beach; others include Donovan's Beach, Halford Beach, Pico Beach and Short Beach.

Among numerous baseball fields and recreational parks, Winthrop's recreational facilities include Larsen Rink, an indoor ice skating rink, and Winthrop Golf Course, a private 9-hole, par 35 golf course.

== Education ==
Winthrop currently has four schools that are a part of Winthrop Public Schools:

- Winthrop Middle School, grades 6–8
- Winthrop High School, grades 9–12
- Arthur T. Cummings Elementary School, grades 3–5
- William P. Gorman Fort Banks Elementary School, grades Pre-K–2

== Media ==
Winthrop has a weekly newspaper, the Winthrop Sun Transcript, which reports local news, current events, happenings, and town concerns.

== Infrastructure ==
=== Transportation ===
Highways include Massachusetts Route 145.

Bus service is provided by Paul Revere Transportation. Bus service in Winthrop began in 1940 following the closure of the Boston, Revere Beach and Lynn Railroad (known as the "Narrow Gauge") which had a Winthrop Branch (1877–1940) with nine stations.

A water transportation dock is located at the public landing and provides ferry service across Boston Harbor. The MBTA operates the service seasonally between Winthrop, Logan Airport, and Central Wharf, and Fan Pier in the Seaport District.

=== Utilities ===
Located on Great Head (Water Tower Hill) is the Winthrop Water Tower. It is a red, white, and blue striped tower capable of holding 1 million US gallons (3,800 m^{3}) of water. It is maintained by Winthrop's Water Department.

== Notable people ==
- Don and Richard Addrisi, singing-songwriting duo
- Bob Barney, professor and Olympic scholar
- Dave Barney, educator and swimming coach
- Mark Bavaro, former National Football League player
- Herbert Bix, Pulitzer Prize winning author
- Patricia Brown, All-American Girls Professional Baseball League player
- Robert DeLeo, politician and former Speaker of the Massachusetts House of Representatives
- Jillian Dempsey, captain of the Boston Pride and all-time NWHL scoring leader
- Rick DiPietro, former National Hockey League goalie
- Art Ditmar, former Major League Baseball player
- Terry Driscoll, professional basketball player
- Gaylord DuBois, author
- Dale Dunbar, former National Hockey League defenseman
- Mike Eruzione, former ice hockey player and captain of the 1980 Winter Olympics United States national team in the famous Miracle on Ice game
- Lewis P. Fickett Jr., Virginia state legislator, diplomat, and educator
- Irving Fine, composer, member of the Boston School
- Stanley Forman, photojournalist
- Thomas Fulham, President of Suffolk University from 1970 to 1980
- Michael Goulian, aerobatic pilot
- Bob Hansen, Major League Baseball player for the Milwaukee Brewers
- Marie Jansen, musical actress, long-time resident
- Edward J. King, Governor of Massachusetts (1979–1983)
- Steven Lento, musician best known under his alias Steven Van Zandt, guitar and mandolin player in Bruce Springsteen's E Street Band
- Daniel Lopatin, electronic musician best known under his alias Oneohtrix Point Never
- James M. Matarazzo, academic
- Robert Ellis Orrall, singer-songwriter
- Sylvia Plath, poet
- Lauren Rikleen, author, lawyer, workplace expert
- Bob Walsh, former National Basketball Association executive
- Benjamin Lee Whorf, linguist
- Richard Whorf, actor
- Pat Woodell, actress and singer
