= Winthrop Public Schools (Massachusetts) =

School district in Massachusetts, US

Winthrop Public Schools is the school district of Winthrop, Massachusetts.

Lisa Howard (née Gill) became the superintendent in 2018.

As of 2020 the enrollment was above 1,900.

== Schools ==
- Winthrop High School (grades 9–12)
- Winthrop Middle School (grades 6–8)
  - Note: Winthrop Middle School and Winthrop High School are housed in the same building, but are two separate and distinct schools with their own administration.
- Arthur T. Cummings Elementary (grades 3–5)
- William P. Gorman/Fort Banks Elementary School (Preschool-2nd grade)

Former schools:

- A.W. Dalrymple School
- E.B. Newton School
- N.E. Willis School
