= List of Maine state parks =

This list includes 35 state parks, public reserved lands, and state historic sites in the U.S. state of Maine. They are operated by the Maine Department of Conservation, with the exceptions of Baxter State Park, which is operated by the Baxter State Park Authority, and Peacock Beach, which is under local management.

Maine State Parks and Historic sites Green- State Parks Blue - Historic sites

== State parks ==
Name	County	Town	Area		Estab- lished	River / lake / other	Image	Remarks
Name	County	Town	acres	ha	Estab- lished	River / lake / other	Image	Remarks
Allagash Wilderness Waterway	Aroostook, Piscataquis		24,164	9,779	1966	Allagash River		Canoeing, fishing, hunting, camping
Androscoggin Riverlands	Androscoggin	Turner	2,674	1,082		Androscoggin River		Canoeing, multi-use trails along 12 miles of river frontage
Aroostook State Park	Aroostook	Presque Isle	898	363	1938	Echo Lake		Swimming, hiking, camping
Baxter State Park	Piscataquis		209,501	84,782	1931			Hiking on Mount Katahdin
Birch Point State Park	Knox	Owls Head	62	25	1999	Penobscot Bay		Pocket beach
Bradbury Mountain State Park	Cumberland	Pownal	730	300	1939			Mountain biking
Camden Hills State Park	Knox, Waldo	Camden, Lincolnville	5,710	2,310	1947			Trails: hiking, horseback riding, mountain biking, cross-country skiing, snowmobiling
Cobscook Bay State Park	Washington	Edmunds Township	871	352	1964	Cobscook Bay		Tide watching
Crescent Beach State Park	Cumberland	Cape Elizabeth	242	98	1966	Atlantic Ocean		Saltwater beach, hiking trails
Damariscotta Lake State Park	Lincoln	Jefferson	19	7.7	1970	Damariscotta Lake		Sandy beach
Ferry Beach State Park	York	Saco	117	47		Atlantic Ocean		Sandy beach
Fort Point State Park	Waldo	Stockton Springs	156	63	1974	Penobscot Bay		Scenic vistas, fishing
Grafton Notch State Park	Oxford	Grafton Township	3,129	1,266	1963	Bear River		Hiking
Holbrook Island Sanctuary State Park	Hancock	Brooksville	1,345	544	1971	Penobscot Bay		Hiking, kayaking, swimming, birdwatching
Lake St. George State Park	Waldo	Liberty Township	358	145		Lake St. George		Camping, swimming, boating, hiking
Lamoine State Park	Hancock	Lamoine	55	22	1949	Frenchman's Bay		Camping, kayaking
Lily Bay State Park	Piscataquis	Greenville	924	374	1959	Moosehead Lake		Fronts the state's largest lake
Mackworth Island	Cumberland	Falmouth	100	40	1946	Casco Bay		Hiking, scenic vistas
Moose Point State Park	Waldo	Searsport	146	59	1952	Penobscot Bay		Hiking, scenic vistas
Mount Blue State Park	Franklin	Weld	7,489	3,031	1955	Webb Lake		Beach, hiking, camping
Mount Kineo State Park	Piscataquis	Kineo Township	800	320		Moosehead Lake		Trails, vistas
Owls Head Light State Park	Knox	Owls Head	13	5.3		Penobscot Bay		Beaches, lighthouse
Peacock Beach State Park	Sagadahoc	Richmond	10	4.0		Pleasant Pond		Locally managed
Peaks-Kenny State Park	Piscataquis	Dover-Foxcroft, Bowerbank	813	329	1964	Sebec Lake		Beach, boating, camping
Penobscot River Corridor	Piscataquis, Somerset		12,500	5,100		Penobscot River		Remote, wilderness recreation, fishing, hiking, canoeing
Popham Beach State Park	Sagadahoc	Phippsburg	605	245		Atlantic Ocean		Sandy beach
Quoddy Head State Park	Washington	Lubec	541	219	1962	Atlantic Ocean		Historic lighthouse
Range Ponds State Park	Androscoggin	Poland	740	300	1965	Range Ponds		Sandy beach
Rangeley Lake State Park	Franklin	Rangeley, Rangeley Plantation	870	350	1960	Rangeley Lake		Lakeside camping
Reid State Park	Sagadahoc	Georgetown	770	310	1946	Sheepscot Bay		Swimming, sandy beaches
Roque Bluffs State Park	Washington	Roque Bluffs	274	111	1969	Englishman Bay		Hiking trails
Sebago Lake State Park	Cumberland	Naples, Casco	1,342	543	1938	Sebago Lake		Boating, swimming, camping
Shackford Head State Park	Washington	Eastport	87	35	1989	Cobscook Bay		Shoreline and inland hiking
Swan Lake State Park	Waldo	Swanville	67	27		Swan Lake		Swimming, canoeing
Two Lights State Park	Cumberland	Cape Elizabeth	41	17	1961	Casco Bay		Historic lighthouses
Vaughan Woods State Park	York	South Berwick	165	67	1949	Salmon Falls River		Old-growth forest
Warren Island State Park	Waldo	Islesboro	70	28	1959	Penobscot Bay		Access by private boat
Wolfe's Neck Woods State Park	Cumberland	Freeport	244	99	1969	Casco Bay		Osprey watching

== State historic sites ==
Name	County	Town	Area		Image	Remarks
Name	County	Town	acres	ha	Image	Remarks
Bible Point	Aroostook		27	11		Campsite of the young Teddy Roosevelt on Mattawamkeag Lake
Colburn House State Historic Site	Kennebec	Pittston	6	2.4		Home of patriot and shipbuilder Reuben Colburn
Colonial Pemaquid State Historic Site	Lincoln	Bristol	19	7.7		Site of colonial settlement dating from the early 1600s
Eagle Island State Historic Site	Cumberland	Harpswell	17	6.9		Casco Bay home of explorer Admiral Robert Peary
Fort Baldwin State Historic Site	Sagadahoc	Phippsburg	10	4.0		Early 20th-century coastal defense fortification near the mouth of the Kennebec River
Fort Edgecomb State Historic Site	Lincoln	Edgecomb	3	1.2		Two-story, octagonal wooden blockhouse on Davis Island
Fort Halifax State Historic Site	Kennebec	Winslow	0.75	0.30		British colonial outpost on the Sebasticook River
Fort Kent State Historic Site	Aroostook	Fort Kent	3	1.2		Fortification built during the Aroostook War at the confluence of the Fish and Saint John rivers
Fort Knox State Historic Site	Waldo	Prospect	124	50		Nineteenth-century coastal fortification on the Penobscot River
Fort McClary State Historic Site	York	Kittery Point	27	11		Nineteenth-century coastal fortification at the mouth of the Piscataqua River
Fort O'Brien State Historic Site	Washington	Machiasport	2	0.81		Site of fortification on the Machias River destroyed during both the American Revolutionary War and the War of 1812
Fort Popham State Historic Site	Sagadahoc	Phippsburg	4	1.6		Civil War-era coastal fortification at the mouth of the Kennebec River
Fort Pownall	Waldo	Stockton Springs	3	1.2		In Fort Point State Park
John Paul Jones State Historic Site	York	Kittery	2	0.81		Site of the Maine Sailors' and Soldiers' Memorial by Bashka Paeff
Katahdin Iron Works	Piscataquis	T6R9	23	9.3		Site of an ironworks in operation from 1845 to 1890
Storer Garrison State Historic Site	York	Wells	0	0		A plaque commemorating the site of the Storer Garrison
Whaleback Shell Midden	Lincoln	Damariscotta	11	4.5		Oyster shell midden on the Damariscotta River

== Public reserved lands ==
Name	County	Town	Area		Estab- lished	River / lake / other	Image	Remarks
Name	County	Town	acres	ha	Estab- lished	River / lake / other	Image	Remarks
Bald Mountain	Franklin		1,873	758				
Bigelow Preserve	Franklin, Somerset		35,000	14,000				
Bradley	Penobscot		9,113	3,688				
Chains of Ponds	Franklin		1,119	453				
Chamberlain Lake	Piscataquis		10,290	4,160				
Cutler Coast	Washington		12,238	4,953				
Day's Academy	Piscataquis		7,309	2,958				
Dead River	Somerset		7,031	2,845				
Deboullie	Aroostook		21,871	8,851				
Dodge Point	Lincoln		548	222				
Donnell Pond	Hancock		15,391	6,229				
Duck Lake	Hancock, Washington		25,220	10,210				
Eagle Lake	Aroostook		24,416	9,881				
Four Ponds	Franklin		6,018	2,435				
Gero Island	Piscataquis		4,051	1,639				
Great Heath	Washington		6,207	2,512				
Holeb	Somerset		20,155	8,156				
Kennebec Highlands	Franklin, Kennebec		6,076	2,459				
Little Moose	Piscataquis		15,055	6,093				
Machias River Corridor	Washington		10,026	4,057				
Mahoosuc	Oxford		31,807	12,872				
Moosehead Lake	Piscataquis		14,500	5,900				
Mount Abram	Franklin		6,214	2,515				
Nahmakanta	Piscataquis		43,966	17,792				
Pineland	Cumberland		646	261				
Richardson	Oxford		22,728	9,198				
Rocky Lake	Washington		11,150	4,510				
Round Pond	Aroostook		20,349	8,235				
Salmon Brook Lake Bog	Aroostook		1,857	752				
Scraggly Lake	Penobscot		9,092	3,679				
Scopan	Aroostook		20,135	8,148				
Seboeis Unit	Penobscot, Piscataquis		21,369	8,648				
Seboomook	Somerset		41,500	16,800				
Telos	Aroostook		22,962	9,292				
Tumbledown	Franklin		10,555	4,271				
Wassataquoik	Penobscot		2,099	849				

== See also ==
- List of U.S. national parks
- Maine Wildlife Management Areas (WMA)
