= Pownal Cattle Pound =

- U.S. National Register of Historic Places
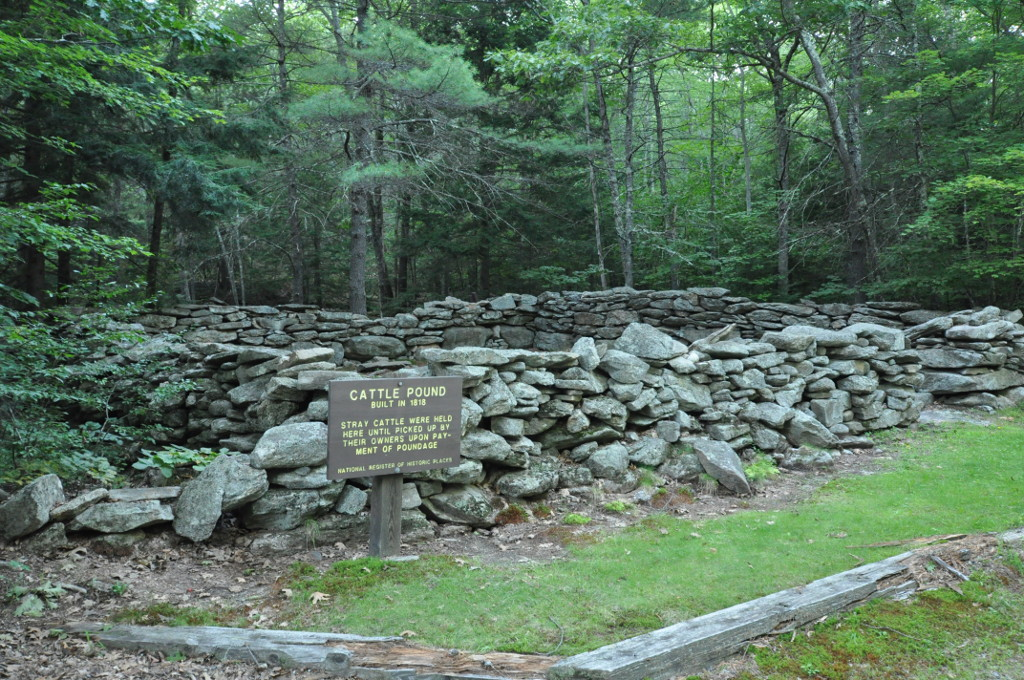

- Location within Maine Location within the United States
- Location: Hallowell Rd., Bradbury Mountain State Park, 0.7 mi. N of jct with Dyer Rd., Pownal, Maine
- Coordinates: 43°54′6″N 70°10′41″W
- Area: 0.2 acres (0.081 ha)
- Built: 1818
- Built by: Tyler, John
- NRHP reference No.: 04000745
- Added to NRHP: July 28, 2004

The Pownal Cattle Pound is a historic stone animal pound in Bradbury Mountain State Park, Pownal, Maine. Built in 1818, it is one of a modest number of these once-common structures left in the state. It was listed on the National Register of Historic Places in 2004.

== Description and history ==
The Pownal Cattle Pound is located about 0.5 miles (0.80 km) northeast of the center of Pownal, on the northwest side of Maine State Route 9. It is located in Bradbury Mountain State Park, which the road passes through, with the eponymous mountain rising north of the structure. The pound is a rectangular stone structure, built of dry-laid fieldstone, with an opening near the northeast corner. The walls currently vary between 4.5 feet (1.4 m) and 5.5 feet (1.7 m) in height, but were probably originally 6 feet (1.8 m) in height; the difference is due in part to collapse, and in part to use of some of the stone in local road projects in the 1950s. As built, the walls were 4 feet (1.2 m) thick at the base and 18 inches (0.46 m) thick at the top, and would have been topped by a timber beams. The opening was originally topped by a long granite lintel, which now lies on the ground inside the enclosure, and would have been closed off by an iron gate.

Since early colonial days, most New England communities used animal pounds as a means to pen in stray livestock until it could be recovered by its owner. The town of Pownal, incorporated in 1808, hired John Tyler to construct this pound for $50 in 1817; he completed it the following year. The land on which it was located belonged to the Cotton family, who owned Bradbury Mountain and the surrounding area, and whose house stood nearby until it burned down in 1929. Thomas Cotton was hired as the town's first poundkeeper. The pound was used until 1891, by which time changes in technology (mainly the advent of barbed wire) and a reduction in farming had rendered it obsolete. At the time of its National Register listing in 2004, it was one of about twenty such structures left in the state.

== See also ==
- National Register of Historic Places listings in Cumberland County, Maine
