= George Lake =

George Lake may refer to:

== People ==
- George Hingston Lake (1847–1900), early colonial South Australia politician
- George Lake (footballer) (1889–1918), English footballer

== Lakes ==
- George Lake, within the basin of Pembina River (Alberta), Canada
- George Lake (Nunavut), Canada - see George Lake Aerodrome
- George Lake, Killarney Provincial Park, Ontario, Canada
- George Lake (Missoula County, Montana), a lake in Missoula County, Montana, United States
- George Lake (Park County, Montana), a lake in Park County, Montana

== Other uses ==
- George Lake Aerodrome, a privately owned ice runway on George Lake, Nunavut

== See also ==
- St. George Lake, Maine, United States, a lake
- Walter F. George Lake, on the border of Alabama and Georgia, United States
