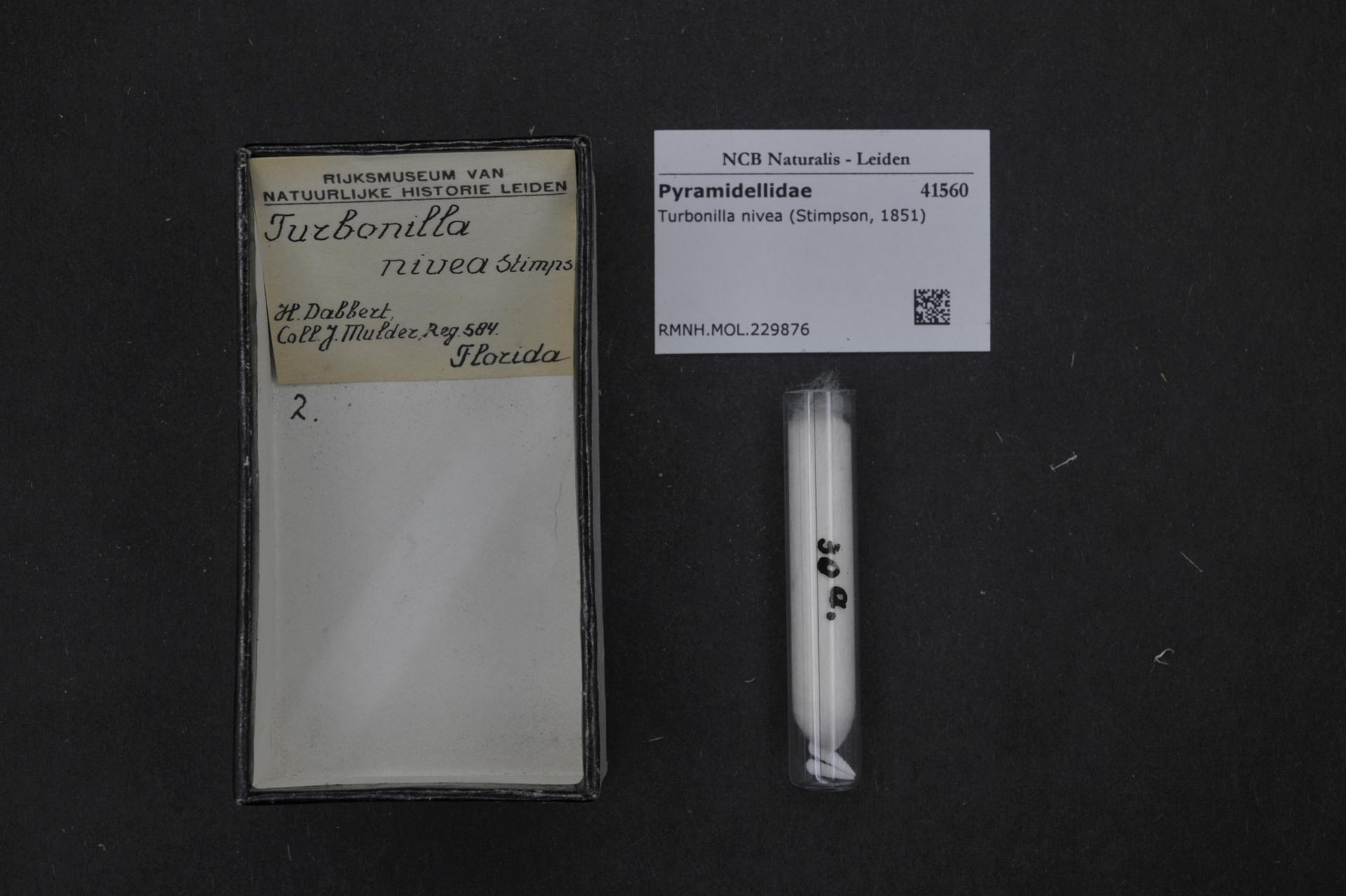
- Turbonilla nivea (only the 2 shells at the bottom are turbonilla niveas)

Scientific classification
- Kingdom: Animalia
- Phylum: Mollusca
- Class: Gastropoda
- Family: Pyramidellidae
- Genus: Turbonilla
- Species: T. nivea

Binomial name
- Turbonilla nivea (Stimpson, 1851)

Synonyms
- Turbonilla stricta A. E. Verrill, 1873; Turbonilla (Chemnitzia) nivea (Stimpson, 1851)

= Turbonilla nivea =

Species of gastropod

Turbonilla nivea is a species of sea snail, a marine gastropod mollusk in the family Pyramidellidae, the pyrams and their allies.

== Description ==
The shell grows to a length of 7 mm.

== Distribution ==
This species occurs in the following locations:

- Caribbean Sea
- Lesser Antilles
- Atlantic Ocean (Cobscook Bay, Gulf of Maine to Central Brazil)

== Notes ==
Additional information regarding this species:

- Distribution: Range: 45°N to 24°S; 75°W to 45°W. Distribution: Canada; Canada: Prince Edward Island (from the northern tip of Miscou Island, N.B. to Cape Breton Island south of Chéticamp, including the Northumberland Strait and Georges Bay to the Canso Strait causeway), New Brunswick; USA: Maine, Massachusetts, New York, North Carolina; Virgin Islands: St. Croix; Brazil; Brazil: São Paulo
- Habitat: intertidal and infralittoral of the Gulf and estuary
