= Lily Bay, Maine =

Lily Bay, Maine may refer to one of two places in the U.S. state of Maine:

- Lily Bay, a bay of Moosehead Lake in Piscataquis County
- Lily Bay State Park, a 924-acre (374 ha) public recreation area in Greenville
