= Poundmaster =

Government official

A poundmaster, or poundkeeper, was a local government official responsible for the feeding and care of stray livestock such as domestic pigs, cattle, horses, sheep, and geese. This was common in colonial America and continued into the 19th century.

Unlike today, the control of stray companion animals (cats and dogs) was not the duty of the poundmaster.

== Duties and function ==
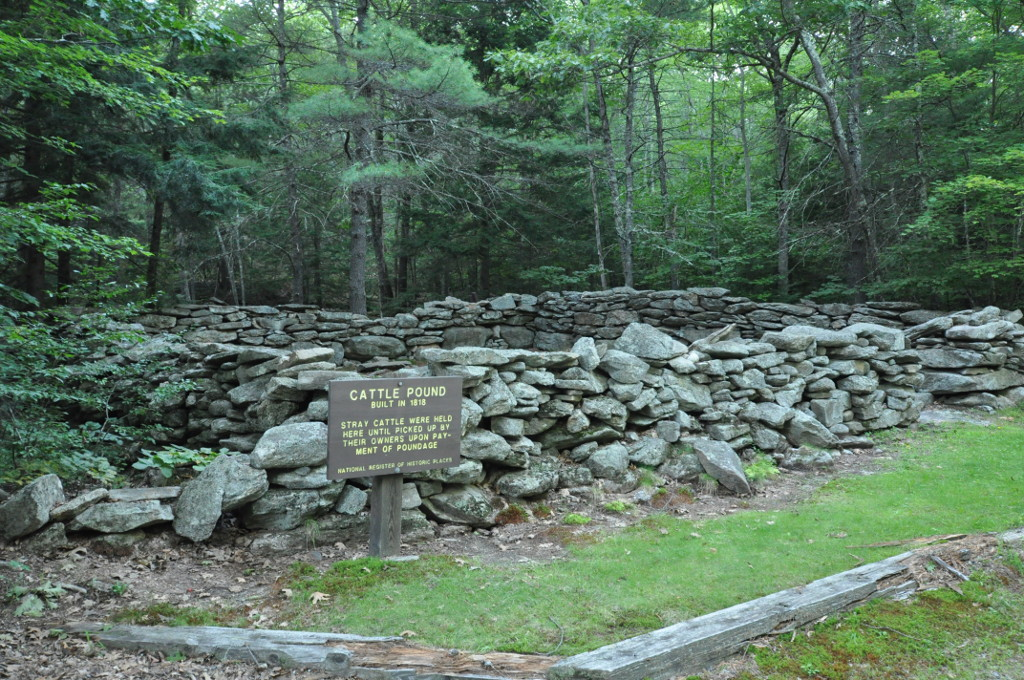
Historic Stone Animal Pound in Pownal, Maine

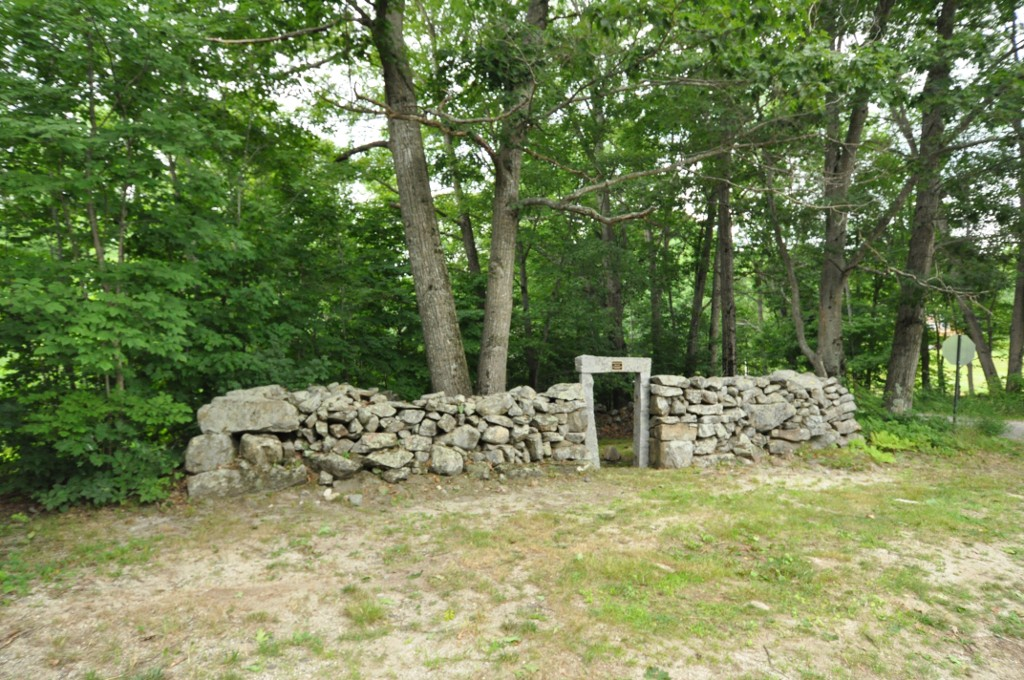
Historic Stone Animal Pound in Turner, Maine

The poundmaster was tasked with impounding livestock that were loose in a city, town, or village. Wayward animals were brought to the pound by the poundmaster, constables, or private citizens. The poundmaster would attempt to notify the owner, who could pay a fine and any associated fees, and claim the animal(s). If unclaimed, the animals would be sold at auction.

More valuable livestock could require longer periods of public notification before an auction.

In New York state, in the early 19th century, the poundmaster was required by law to sell unclaimed impounded animals within six days and give 48 hours' notice of the sale. The owner could claim the proceeds of the sale (less fines and fees) for one year after the sale at which time the money would be transferred to the overseer of the poor for their use.

Fees include the fee for the poundmaster plus daily feeding costs of the animals, fees of any fence viewers involved in the case, and any property damages assessed by the fence-viewers.

A New York State law of March 19, 1813 required each town to choose as many poundmasters as the electors determined to be "necessary and convenient." While other town officials were elected by secret ballot, the town clerk used a blank sheet of paper to write the names of poundmaster candidates and record their votes.

In some areas, the poundmaster would slaughter the animals and sell only the meat.

In the 18th century, the pound was typically a centrally located stone fenced enclosure. Two such partially surviving structures, the Pownal Cattle Pound and the Turner Cattle Pound, both in Maine, are listed on the National Register of Historic Places.

Since the need to deal with stray livestock today is rare, the function has evolved into the modern dog-catcher or animal control officer. While not commonly used, the term poundmaster is often found in local government charters. It is referring to the person in charge of a (companion animal) pound.

== Other countries ==
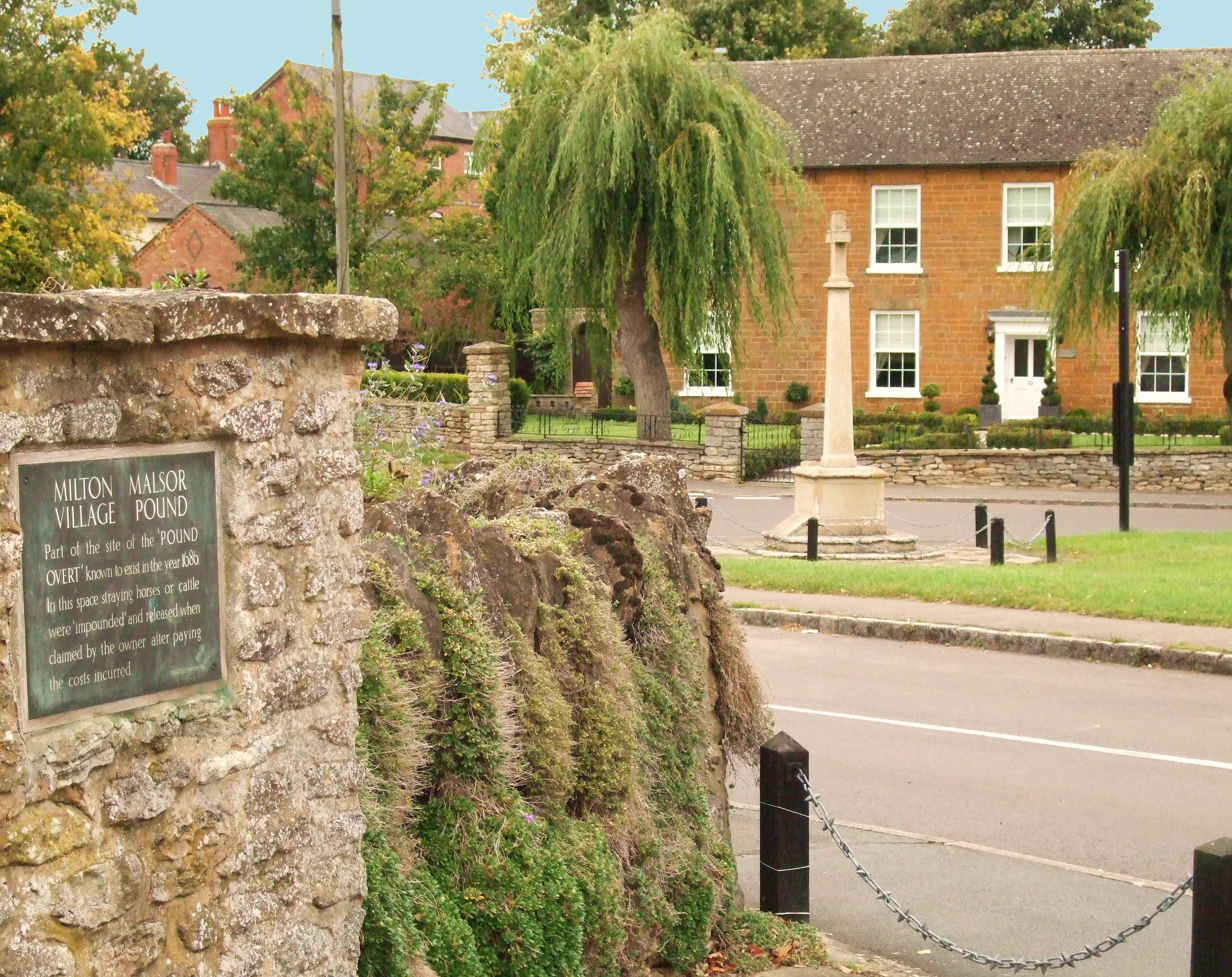
Milton Malsor village pound, Northamptonshire, England, dating from at least 1686

The poundmaster also existed in Australia, and may go back to England in the Middle Ages.
