= Warren Island =

Warren Island may refer to:

- Warren Island (Alaska)
- Warren Island (Antarctica)
- Warren Island State Park in Maine
