= Hawaii 2 =

Private island in Maine, United States

- Location within Maine Location within the United States

Geography
- Location: St. George Lake; Liberty, Maine, US
- Coordinates: 44.397418°N 69.336586°W
- Area: 6 acres (2.4 ha)

Administration
- United States

Additional information
- Official website: hawaii2.website

Hawaii 2 (previously Birch Island) is a six-acre (2.4 ha) private island in St. George Lake, Liberty, Maine, United States. Previously used as de facto public land, in 2014 the island was purchased by Cards Against Humanity LLC as part of a fundraiser for the Sunlight Foundation. After licensing the island for use by those who contributed to the campaign, the town of Liberty threatened the games company with hundreds of millions in fines for code violations.

== History ==
The Bedke/Fox Family Trust owned Birch Island and allowed the public to use it. Since the early 1980s, locals had used the location to picnic, swim, camp, and vacation.

In 2012, Cards Against Humanity LLC fundraised $70,000 (equivalent to about $98,200 in 2025) for the Wikimedia Foundation. For their 2014 fundraiser, the company brainstormed what gifts could be sent via first-class mail, weigh less than two ounces (57 g), measure within 11.5 by 6 inches (290 mm × 150 mm), and be flexible. Remembering their 2012 joke, Cards Against Humanity liaised with the CBRE Group to buy a private island.

Inspired to conserve some small piece of wilderness, raise money for charity, and "make people laugh", Cards Against Humanity bought Birch Island from the Bedke/Fox Family Trust on October 31, 2014, for $190,000 (equivalent to about $258,400 in 2025). The island, located near Liberty, Maine, in St. George Lake (within sight of Maine State Route 3), was renamed Hawaii 2 because "it's the Maine island". Though Google Maps updated the name upon seeing the deed, Cards Against Humanity forwent filing with the United States Board on Geographic Names (BGN) because of the time involved and "[a]pparently, geographic name changes must benefit the community, by honoring a local hero or something."

=== Controversy ===
In 2014, Cards Against Humanity organized a fundraiser called "Ten Days or Whatever of Kwanzaa", wherein participants contributed $15 to receive ten mystery gifts; $1 of each donation was given to the Sunlight Foundation. The tenth gift, sent to approximately 250,000 people, were certificates entitling the bearer to one square foot (0.093 m^{2}) of Hawaii 2: "You may name your square foot of land. You may use the entire private island for passive, non-commercial, non-motorized recreational activities [...] You may tell people at parties that you own part of a private island."

The island's official website clarifies that certificate-holders do not actually own any of Hawaii 2 (Hawaii 2, LLC being the sole owner), but that they "have rights to use it as a license holder". In February 2015, Cards Against Humanity explained that although they initially wanted to deed one-square-foot parcels to their contributors, too many factors stood in the way of this. Those included their mailing budget, rights of way, legal liability for the landowners, the nearby town of Liberty being owed taxes on 250,000 parcels, 6,000 pounds (2,700 kg) of paperwork needed, and the rights of landowners to develop their plot against the conservationist wishes of Cards Against Humanity.

According to Liberty's code enforcement office, the town considers the certificate licenses to have been sold and that "the island 'continues to be advertised and marketed'". Liberty official Donald Harriman told the Bangor Daily News that some license-holders had trespassed in order to reach Hawaii 2, though he did not know whether the Waldo County sheriff's office was involved. In spring 2015, the code-enforcement office wrote to Cards Against Humanity "and gave them until April 15 to cease all commercial activity on the island, revoke the 250,000 'licenses' that grant the exclusive use of 1 square foot of land and remove the shed and platform from its present location". Harriman claimed that, failing this, Cards Against Humanity could face fines of $625 million per day (equivalent to about $849M in 2025). Harriman also accused Cards Against Humanity of "unpermitted commercial use [...] on Birch Island [sic], in violation of the Liberty Shoreland Ordinance, [...] The entire scheme appears to be a development and/or divisions of land for profit with the possibility of intense use at various times." Cards Against Humanity had not responded to the town by April 10, though two months before Liberty's letter, Cards Against Humanity had posted on Tumblr saying that not only had they purchased Hawaii 2 for conservation, but the company also joined the local Liberty Lake Association, and would work with them if any issues happened.

By April 2015, Cards Against Humanity's empty safe—previously containing "sloth cards" and a bottle of Scotch whisky for visitors—had been removed from Hawaii 2, and the company had updated its rules for the island to include allowable hours and prohibitions against leaving or removing anything. By that August, the Bangor Daily News reported that, despite locals' fears, Waldo County, Liberty, and Hawaii 2 had not been overrun, and "[t]he island remained peaceful and free of litter". Liberty Selectman Steve Chapin told the newspaper that Liberty lawyers were still working with Cards Against Humanity "to work out between ourselves some land use agreement that's acceptable to them and us".

== See also ==
- List of islands of Maine
