= Lamoine State Park =

State park in Hancock County, Maine

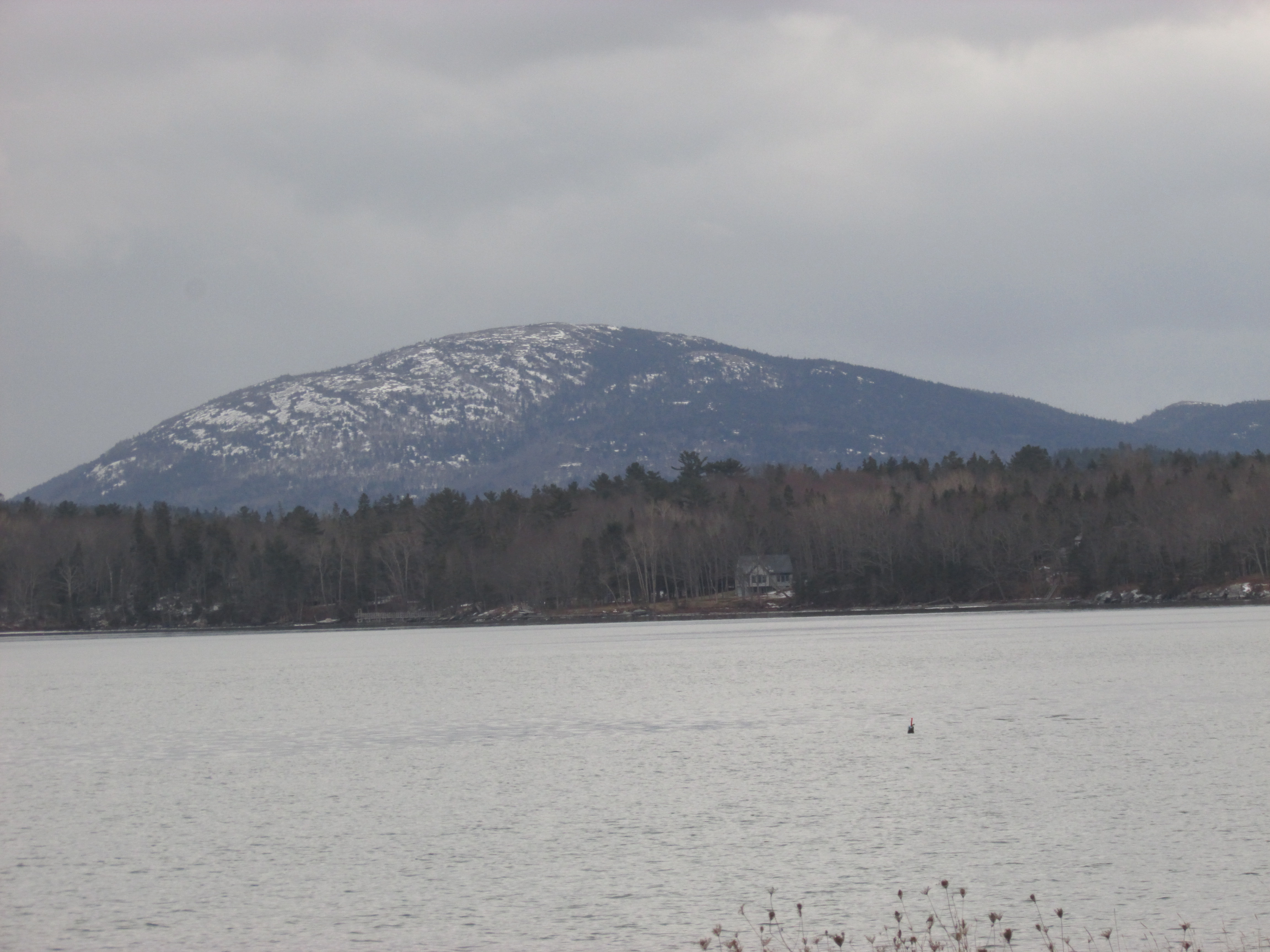
- Park view of Mount Desert Island in winter

- Location within Maine
- Interactive map of Lamoine State Park
- Location: Lamoine, Maine, United States
- Coordinates: 44°27′20″N 68°17′51″W
- Area: 55 acres (22 ha)
- Elevation: 62 ft (19 m)
- Established: 1950s
- Administrator: Maine Department of Agriculture, Conservation and Forestry
- Website: Official website
- Maine State Parks

Lamoine State Park is a public recreation area occupying 55 acres (22 ha) on the shore of Frenchman's Bay in the town of Lamoine, Maine. The state park offers broad views of the mountains on Mount Desert Island, the narrow Eastern Bay portion of Frenchman Bay, and Lamoine's working waterfront. It is managed by the Maine Department of Agriculture, Conservation and Forestry.

== History ==
In the early years of the 20th century, the waterfront where the park stands was the site of a U.S. Navy coaling station. The facility opened in 1902 and ceased operations by 1912 when changing technology made coal-burning warships and their fueling stations obsolete. The state of Maine took possession of the property in 1949, developing it into a state park during the 1950s.

== Activities and amenities ==
The park offers a seasonal, 62-site campground, fishing, picnicking, kayaking, boat launch, and cross-country skiing.
