= Land for Maine's Future =

Land for Maine's Future is the State of Maine's primary funding vehicle for conserving land for its natural and recreational value. It was established in 1987 when Maine voters voted in favor of $35 million bond.

== History ==
The bond which created LMF was sponsored by Democratic state legislator Patrick K. McGowan and Republican David Stanley. Republican Governor John R. McKernan Jr. gave the bond qualified support. Other supporters included future governor Angus King, the Natural Resources Council of Maine, as well as representatives from tourist and restaurant interests. Opponents included the Hannibal Hamlin Institute.

== Notable land purchased or expanded with LMF funding ==
- Birch Point State Park, Owls Head
- Kennebec Highlands, Kennebec County
- Mount Blue State Park, Weld
- Piney Knoll Conservation Area, Orono
- Rangeley Lake State Park, Franklin County
