= Turner Cattle Pound =

- U.S. National Register of Historic Places
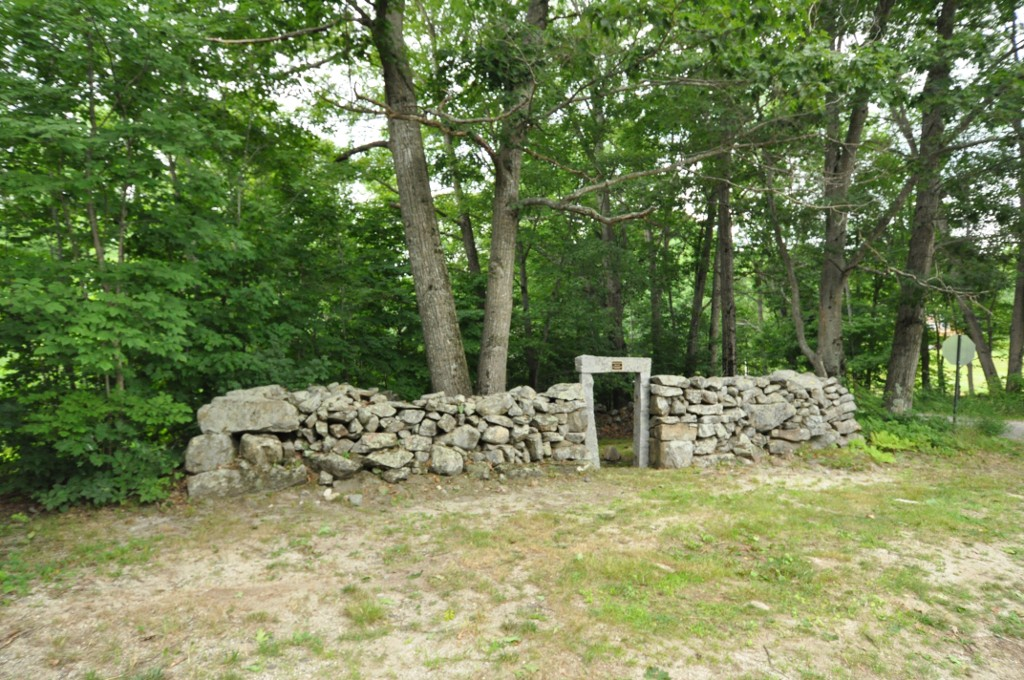

- Location within Maine Location within the United States
- Location: SW corner of Gen. Turner Hill Rd. and Kennebec Trail, Turner, Maine
- Coordinates: 44°16′18″N 70°15′14″W
- Area: less than one acre
- Built: 1816
- Built by: Merrill, Moses
- NRHP reference No.: 09000592
- Added to NRHP: August 7, 2009

Turner Cattle Pound is a historic animal pound at the corner of Gen. Turner Hill Road and Kennebec Trail in Turner, Maine. Built in 1816, it is a well-preserved example of a once-common feature of New England's agricultural communities. It was listed on the National Register of Historic Places in 2009.

== Description and history ==
The Turner Cattle Pound is located near the geographic center of the rural community of Turner, at the southwest corner of General Turner Hill Road and Kennebec Trail. It is a roughly square stone structure, its sides measuring between 36 feet 8 inches (11.18 m) and 37 feet 10 inches (11.53 m) in length. Its walls are fashioned out of fieldstone, laid dry in irregular courses. Portions of the walls have collapsed over time, but were originally between 4 and 5.5 feet (1.2 and 1.7 m) in height. The structure's only entrance is at the center of the east side, formed out of two upright granite posts and a granite lintel about 4 feet (1.2 m) long, which is fastened to the posts by metal pins. One of posts retains the metal pintles from which a gate would have been hung, and the other has an eyebolt where the gate would have been latched.

The town of Turner was settled in 1772 and incorporated in 1786. Its first poundkeeper was elected two years later, but it is not known where stray animals were confined. The first documentation for a municipally funded pound is dated 1795, when a structure of unknown form was authorized to be built in Turner Center. The present structure was funded by the town in 1816 and built by Moses Merrill on land belonging to Cushing Phillips. The site was chosen for its geographically central location, and because it was at the junction of two roads providing access to much of the community. The town's last pound keeper was elected in 1918.

== See also ==
- National Register of Historic Places listings in Androscoggin County, Maine
