= Shackford Head State Park =

State park in Washington County, Maine

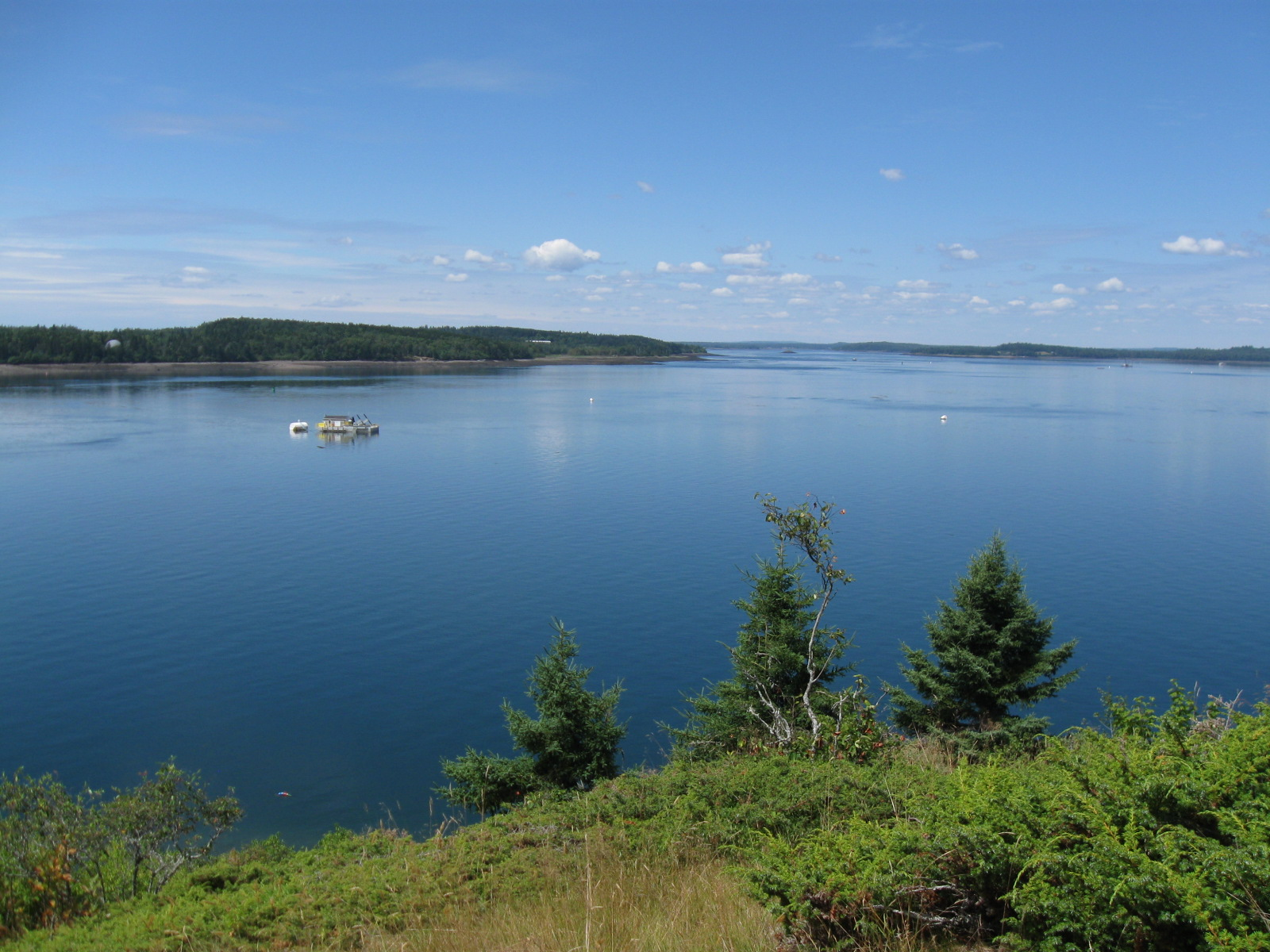
- Cobscook Bay from Shackford Head State Park

- Location within Maine
- Interactive map of Shackford Head State Park
- Location: Eastport, Maine, United States
- Coordinates: 44°54′00″N 67°00′59″W
- Area: 87 acres (35 ha)
- Elevation: 151 ft (46 m)
- Established: 1989
- Administrator: Maine Department of Agriculture, Conservation and Forestry
- Website: Official website
- Maine State Parks

Shackford Head State Park is a public recreation area on Moose Island in the city of Eastport, Washington County, Maine. The 87-acre (35 ha) state park occupies a peninsula that separates Cobscook Bay and Broad Cove. The land is named for John Shackford, an American Revolutionary War soldier who once owned the headlands. The park is managed by the Maine Department of Agriculture, Conservation and Forestry.

== Activities and amenities ==
The park has both inland and coastal hiking trails, including the Cony Beach Trail, Shackford Head Trail, and Schooner Trail. A plaque on Cony Beach marks the spot where five Civil War–era ships were burned for salvage during the early 1900s.
