= Peaks-Kenny State Park =

State park in Piscataquis County, Maine

- Location within Maine
- Interactive map of Peaks-Kenny State Park
- Location: Dover-Foxcroft, Maine, United States
- Coordinates: 45°15′28″N 69°16′36″W
- Area: 813 acres (329 ha)
- Elevation: 394 ft (120 m)
- Established: 1964
- Administrator: Maine Department of Agriculture, Conservation and Forestry
- Website: Official website
- Maine State Parks

Peaks-Kenny State Park is a seasonal public recreation area covering 813 acres (329 ha) on the south shore of Sebec Lake, mostly located in the town of Dover-Foxcroft, Maine. The state park grounds include a white sand beach at South Cove, 56 campsites, picnic area, hiking trails, and canoe and kayak rentals.

== History ==
The area of land that now constitutes the park was donated to the state in 1964 by Francis J. Peaks. The gift was made in memory of his sister, Annie Peaks Kenny, and their parents, Joseph and Eliza Peaks, for whom the park was named.

== Landmarks ==
Norwood Castle sits along the shore of the lake. It was built in 1890 as a wedding gift of wealthy Foxcroft attorney Willis Parsons for his bride. Parsons became the first Commissioner of the Maine Department of Inland Fisheries and Wildlife.

The park is 1 of 5 Maine State Parks that experienced totality for the 2024 solar eclipse, with 1 minute and 56 seconds of totality.
