= Islesboro Central School =

Coordinates: 44.26803°N 68.91539°W

- Islesboro, Maine; United States

Information
- Type: Public
- Established: 1952; 74 years ago
- Headmaster: Kate Legere
- Teaching staff: 14.30 (FTE)
- Grades: K–12
- Enrollment: 76 (2023–2024)
- Student to teacher ratio: 5.31
- Campus: Rural
- Colors: Royal blue and silver
- Mascot: Eagle
- Affiliation: Islesboro School Department
- Superintendent: Connie Brown
- Awards: U.S. News & World Report Bronze Award
- Website: ics.islesboro.k12.me.us

Islesboro Central School (ICS) is a public K-12 school located on Islesboro, Maine, United States. It is the only school on the island, and the sole school of the Islesboro School District, also called Islesboro Public Schools.

== History ==
In 2010, Islesboro Central School underwent a $9 million renovation. Students in grades 5-12 attended school in portables during the construction. Students in grades K-4 attended school in the local Islesboro Community Center.

== Academics ==
Islesboro Central School has a magnet program, which attracts off-island students to the school.

Alumni of Islesboro Central School have matriculated at schools including Bowdoin College, Colby College, Harvard University, Middlebury College, Smith College, University of St Andrews, Maine Maritime Academy, United States Coast Guard Academy, United States Military Academy, Wellesley College, Bates College, Amherst College, and the University of Maine.

== Athletics ==
Islesboro Central School offers four varsity sports:

- Basketball
- Soccer
- Cross-country
- Sailing
- Track and field
