= Up-island spider =

Species of spider

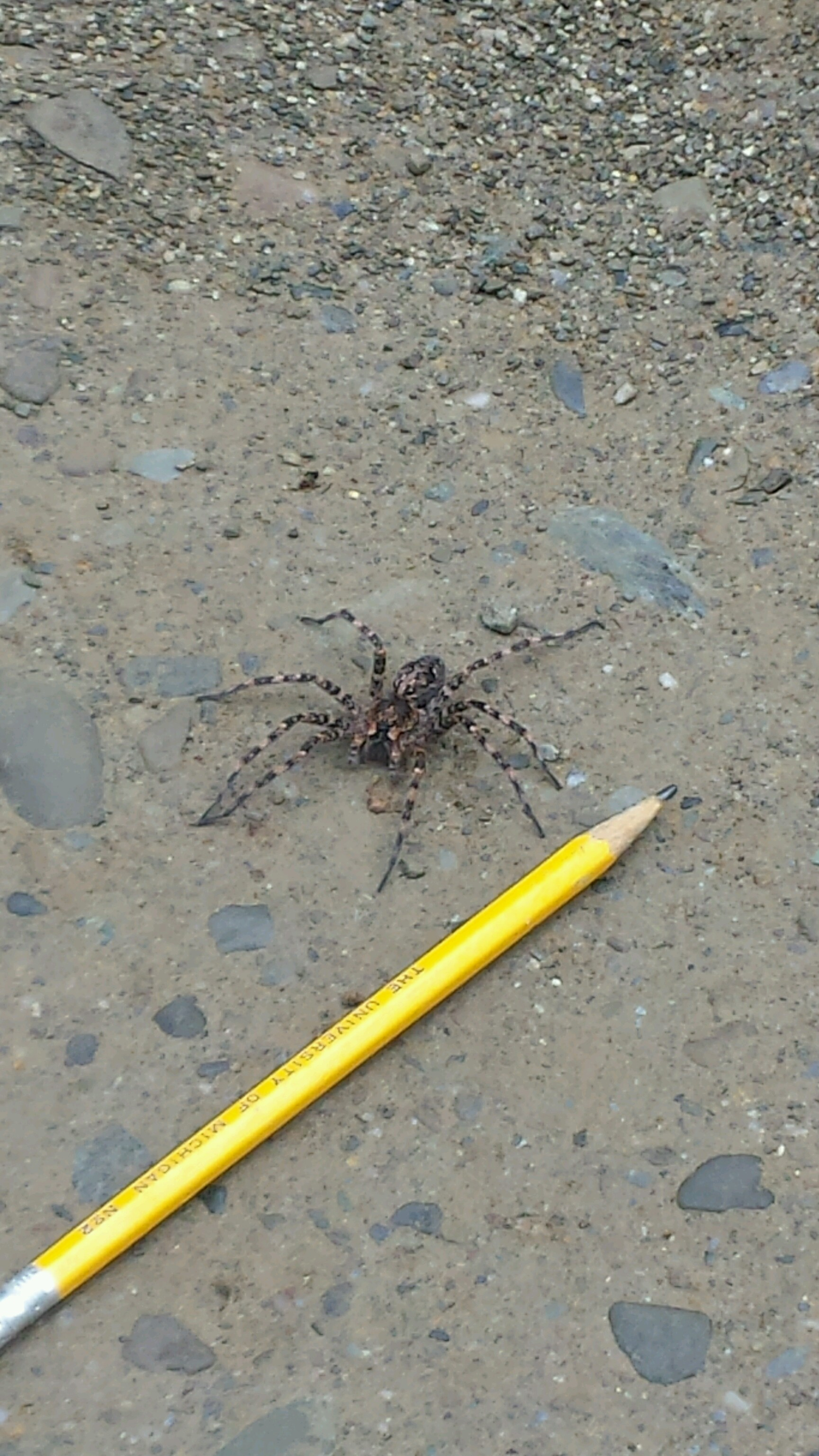
Up-island spider specimen

The up-island spider, also known as a hearse-house spider, is thought to be a species of unusually large wolf spider that inhabits part of Islesboro, Maine.

== Description ==
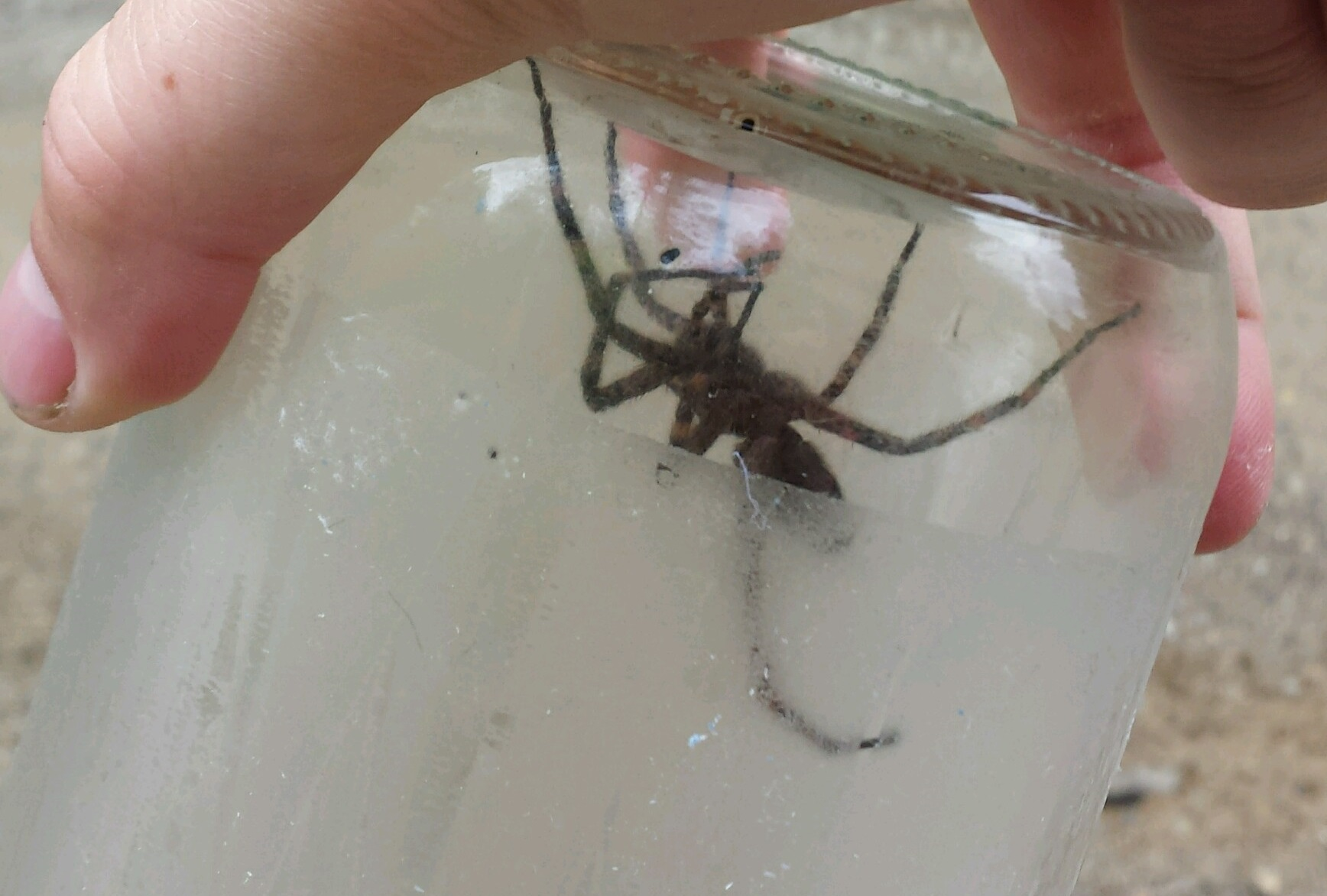
A spider in a jar

The up-island spider is said to be a dark brown spider with red eyes, sharing shape and markings with wolf spiders common in the United States. Its unusual feature is its size, by some reports spanning up to 8 inches with its legs splayed out. Some specimens are reported to be large and heavy enough to create audible footsteps in a quiet room.

While capable of making strands of silk, evidently to aid mobility, the spider is not known to construct webs or nets. It hunts and pounces on prey like a wolf spider. Also, like a wolf spider, it carries its newly hatched young on its back.

== Habitat ==
The up-island spider is known to inhabit only a small range above the narrow tidal isthmus that connects the northern and southern halves of the island of Islesboro, Maine.

Islesboro residents believe that the center of the up-island spider population distribution is the area around the "Up-Island Church", formally known as the Free Will Baptist Church, leading to speculation that the spiders might have arrived on the island in a coffin. "Hearse house" spider is thought to be the oldest name for the spider because long ago they were found in the carriage houses where hearses were stored. There have been limited reports of sightings of these spiders down-island, but they appear to be smaller and not as common as those frequently seen up-island.
