= Lake St. George State Park =

State park in Waldo County, Maine

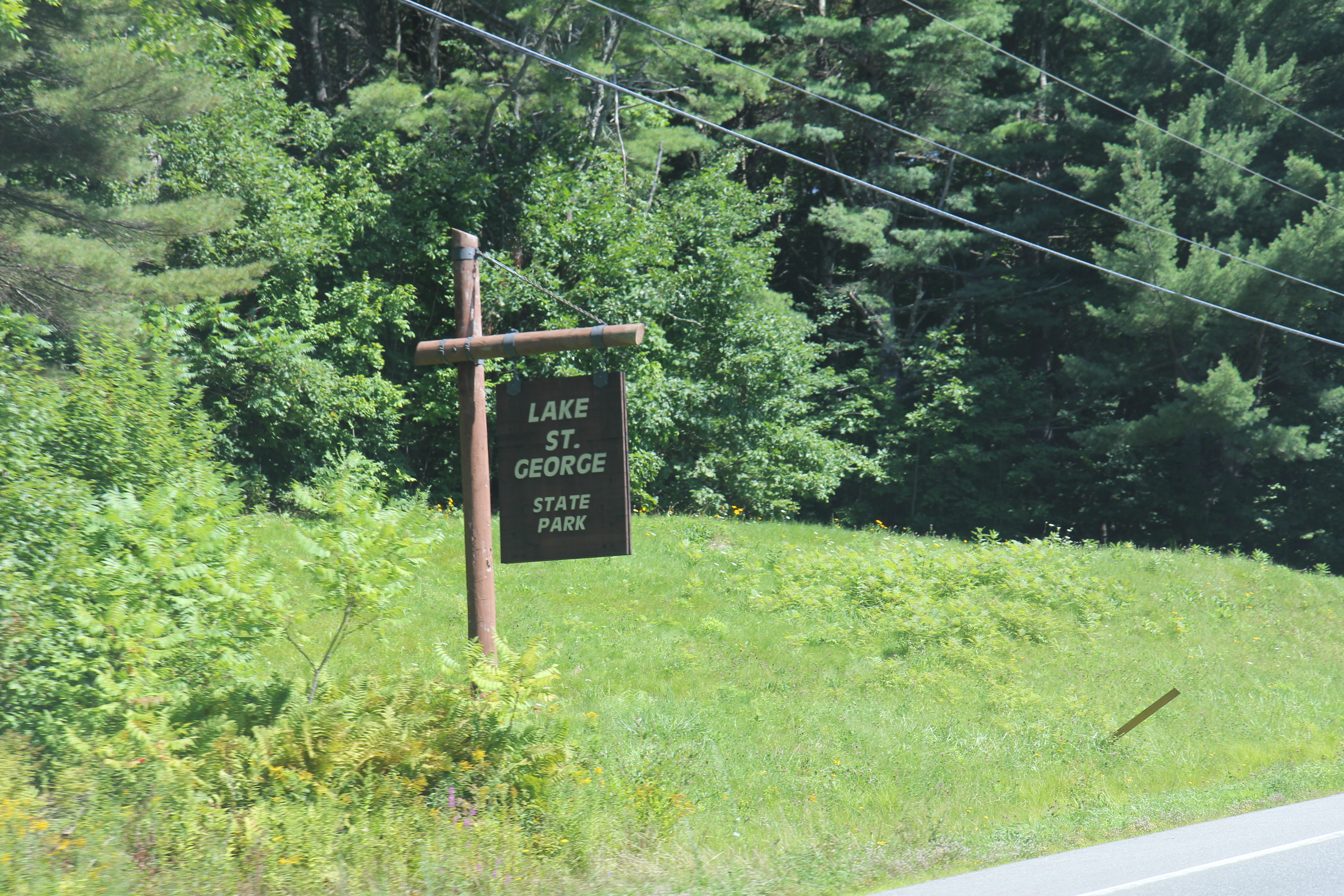

- Location within Maine
- Interactive map of Lake St. George State Park
- Location: Liberty, Maine, United States
- Coordinates: 44°24′14″N 69°21′22″W
- Area: 358 acres (145 ha)
- Elevation: 686 ft (209 m)
- Administrator: Maine Department of Agriculture, Conservation and Forestry
- Website: Official website
- Maine State Parks

Lake St. George State Park is a public recreation area located on the northwest shore of Lake St. George in the town of Liberty, Waldo County, Maine. The state park covers 358 acres (145 ha) and offers camping, lifeguard-supervised swimming, picnicking, canoeing, motorized boating, and fishing. The lake's 1,017 acres (412 ha) support populations of landlocked salmon and brook trout. The park is managed by the Maine Department of Agriculture, Conservation and Forestry.
