= Roque Bluffs State Park =

State park in Washington County, Maine

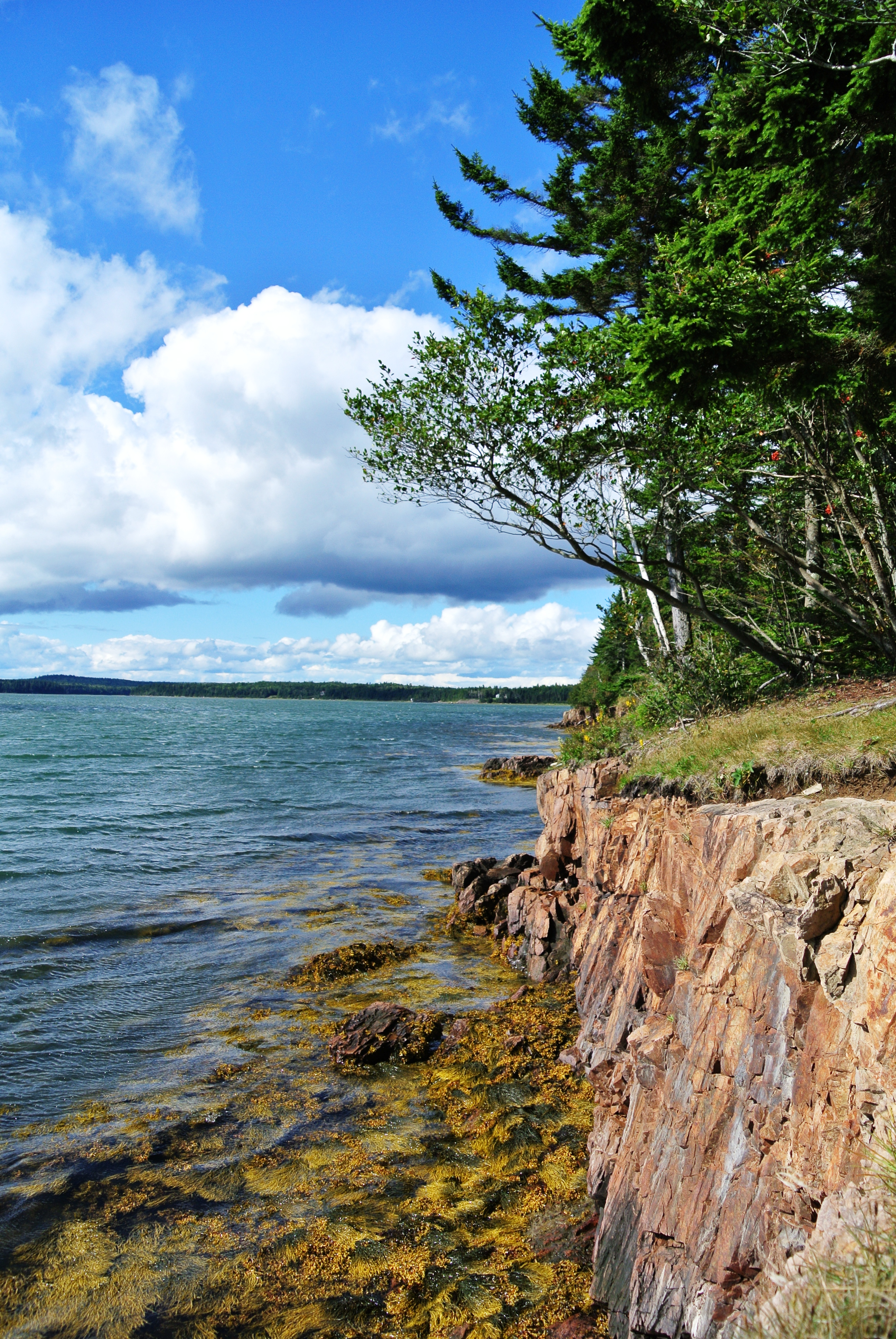

- Location within Maine
- Interactive map of Roque Bluffs State Park
- Location: Roque Bluffs, Maine, United States
- Coordinates: 44°36′41″N 67°28′59″W
- Area: 274 acres (111 ha)
- Elevation: 20 ft (6.1 m)
- Established: 1969
- Administrator: Maine Department of Agriculture, Conservation and Forestry
- Website: Official website
- Maine State Parks

Roque Bluffs State Park is a public recreation area on the coast of the Atlantic Ocean in the town of Roque Bluffs, Washington County, Maine. The 274-acre (111 ha) state park overlooks Englishman Bay from Schoppee Point and includes 60-acre (24 ha) Simpson Pond and six miles of walking trails. Visitors can inspect glacial striations attesting to the Ice Age history of the Maine coast. The park is managed by the Maine Department of Agriculture, Conservation and Forestry.

== In the news ==
In 2011, Maine police, wardens, marine patrol officers and members of the U.S. Coast Guard conducted a fruitless five-day search for a resident of Fredericton, New Brunswick, Torray Wallace, one of many people who appeared in the 2005 film BBS: The Documentary, after his vehicle was found abandoned in the park.

In 2013, two women, one from nearby Machias and the other visiting from Pennsylvania, drowned after driving off a boat ramp in the park during high tide and inclement weather. The women had been rescued earlier in the day after getting lost while hiking in the fog.
