= Moose Island, Maine =

Island in Washington County, Maine, United States

Coordinates: 44°55′01″N 67°00′24″W

Moose Island is an island in Eastport, Maine, located at the entrance to Cobscook Bay from Passamaquoddy Bay in the Bay of Fundy. Shackford Head State Park is on Moose Island.

Connected to the mainland portion of Washington County at Passamaquoddy Pleasant Point Reservation by a causeway, the city of Eastport occupies several islands, including its major land mass, Moose Island. Other islands comprising the city include Carlow Island, Spectacle Island, Goose Island, and Treat Island, along with other islets. Quoddy Village lies at the north-western end of Moose Island, while the city's downtown lies at the eastern end of the island. The Eastport Municipal Airport lies between Quoddy Village and downtown Eastport.

== History ==
Here, as in other frontier towns in the United States, an extensive contraband trade was carried on for several years, almost with impunity ; and, while this trade flourished, and strangers flocked here to engage in it, the state of society was lamentable. The embargo laid by Congress in December, 1807, gave an impulse to the illicit trade with the British colonies which our government vainly strove to check, and which, finally, evading every means adopted to suppress it, became immense.

— Moose Island, 1872 by Lorenzo Sabine

During the War of 1812, British forces under Captain Sir Thomas Hardy and Lieutenant-Colonel Andrew Pilkington seized Moose Island while taking control of the entire Maine coast from Penobscot Bay to the St. Croix River.

Following the war, the United States relinquished its claim in 1817 on several larger islands in the Bay of Fundy that Britain also claimed: (Campobello Island, Deer Island, Grand Manan Island). In return, Britain relinquished its claim on islands in Cobscook Bay.

During the 1930s, President Franklin D. Roosevelt promoted the ill-fated Quoddy Project as a tidal power project for the Cobscook Bay area as part of his New Deal through the Public Works Administration. Part of this project involved construction of a tidal barrage between Moose Island and Pleasant Point to contain the waters of Cobscook Bay, resulting in the present-day causeway carrying Maine State Route 190 and the abandoned Maine Central Railroad. However, the railroad was built 1897-1898, on trestles between islands, to reach Moose Island. The causeway filled in where the trestles ran.

Moose Island is the birthplace of Brigadier General James Henry Carleton (b. 1814), commander of New Mexico and architect of the infamous Long Walk of the Navajo. Author Hampton Sides states: "The time of Carleton's youth was a fragile period in the history of eastern Maine. During the War of 1812, British forces had occupied most of Maine east of the Penobscot River and annexed the territory to New Brunswick....Some have speculated that it was Carleton's memory of this unpleasant experience from his adolescence—of his family having to endure a bitter, protracted, worrisome dispute along what amounted to a wild frontier—that gave him later in life such an urgent impatience to solve the Navajo problem with clean, stark finality."

"Moose Island, Maine" was the fictional location where Jimmy Olsen's Aunt Louisa lived in the first season, second episode of "Adventures of Superman" which originally aired on September 26, 1952.

== See also ==
- List of islands of Maine
