= Birch Point State Park =

State park in Knox County, Maine

- Location within Maine
- Interactive map of Birch Point State Park
- Location: Owls Head, Maine, United States
- Coordinates: 44°02′19″N 69°05′44″W
- Area: 62 acres (25 ha)
- Elevation: 23 ft (7.0 m)
- Established: 1999
- Administrator: Maine Department of Agriculture, Conservation and Forestry
- Website: Official website
- Maine State Parks

Birch Point State Park is a public recreation area occupying 62 acres (25 ha) on Penobscot Bay in the town of Owls Head, Knox County, Maine. The state park features a sandy, crescent-shaped "pocket beach" with scenic views of the Muscle Ridge Islands dotting Muscle Ridge Channel. The park is managed by the Maine Department of Agriculture, Conservation and Forestry.

== History ==
Known locally as Lucia Beach, the property was acquired by the state in 1999, in part with funds from the Land for Maine's Future program.

== Activities and amenities ==
The park offers tide pools, gentle surf, swimming in bracing waters, fishing, and picnicking. Short trails lead to the rocks and enclaves of the headlands that frame each end of the beach.
