= Piney Knoll Conservation Area =

Protected area in Maine, United States

- Interactive map of Piney Knoll Conservation Area
- Type: Forest
- Location: Orono, Maine, United States
- Coordinates: 44.896°N 68.648°W
- Area: 75 acres (30 ha)
- Created: 1991
- Operator: Orono Land Trust

Piney Knoll Conservation Area is a protected area of Orono, Maine, United States. Located at the southern end of Marsh Island along the Penobscot River, it is noted as a site for bird-watching as well as local wildlife. It includes 4.5 miles of intersecting trails.

It was established in 1991 with funds donated by Bangor Hydro-Electric Company as part of an ultimately failed plan to build a nearby dam. In 2010, Land for Maine's Future supported the OLT in purchasing 20 more acres for conservation. The land was formerly a settlement of the Penobscot people as well as port for a ferry to Bradley, Maine.
