= Cobscook Bay State Park =

State park in Washington County, Maine

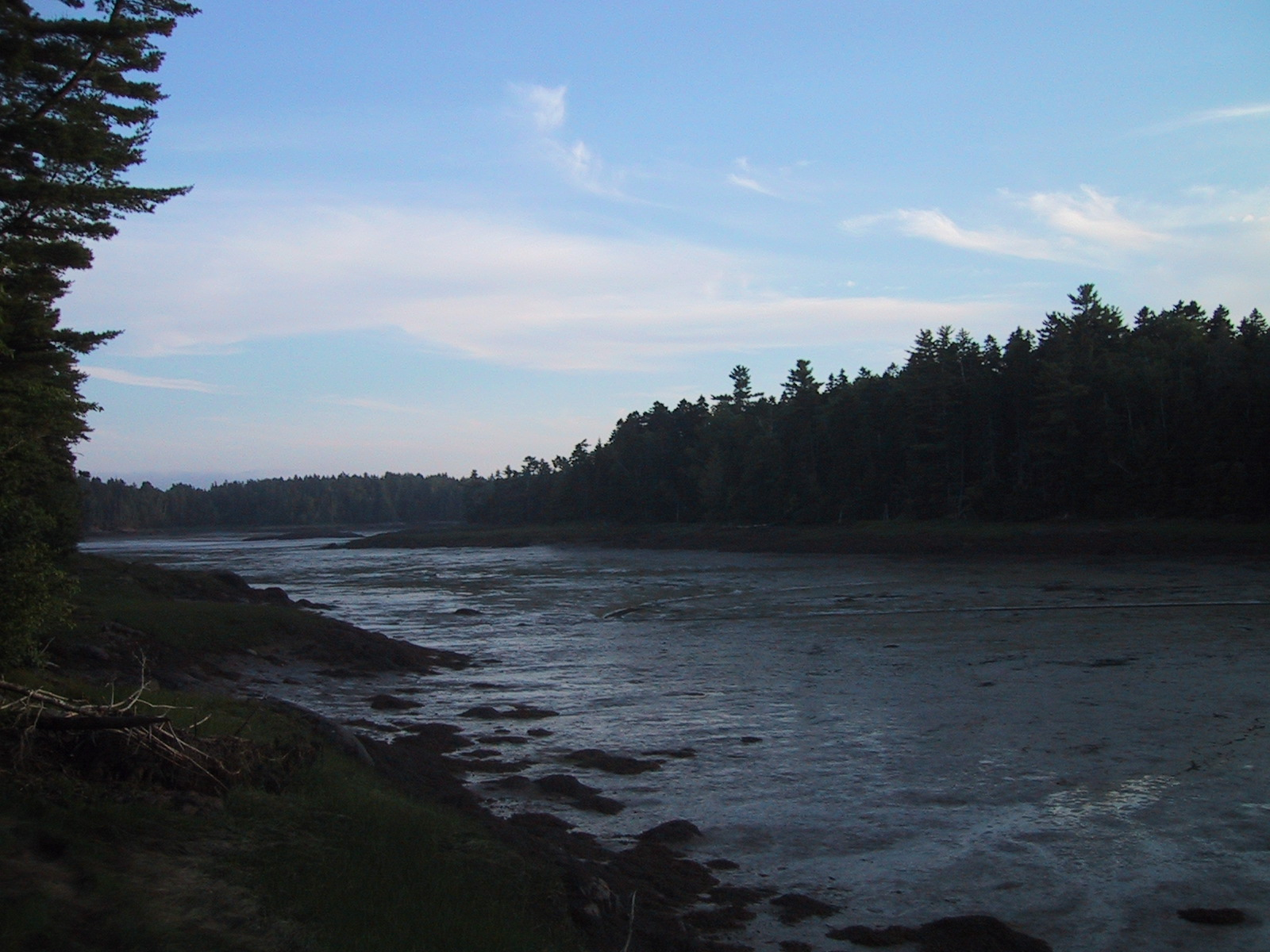
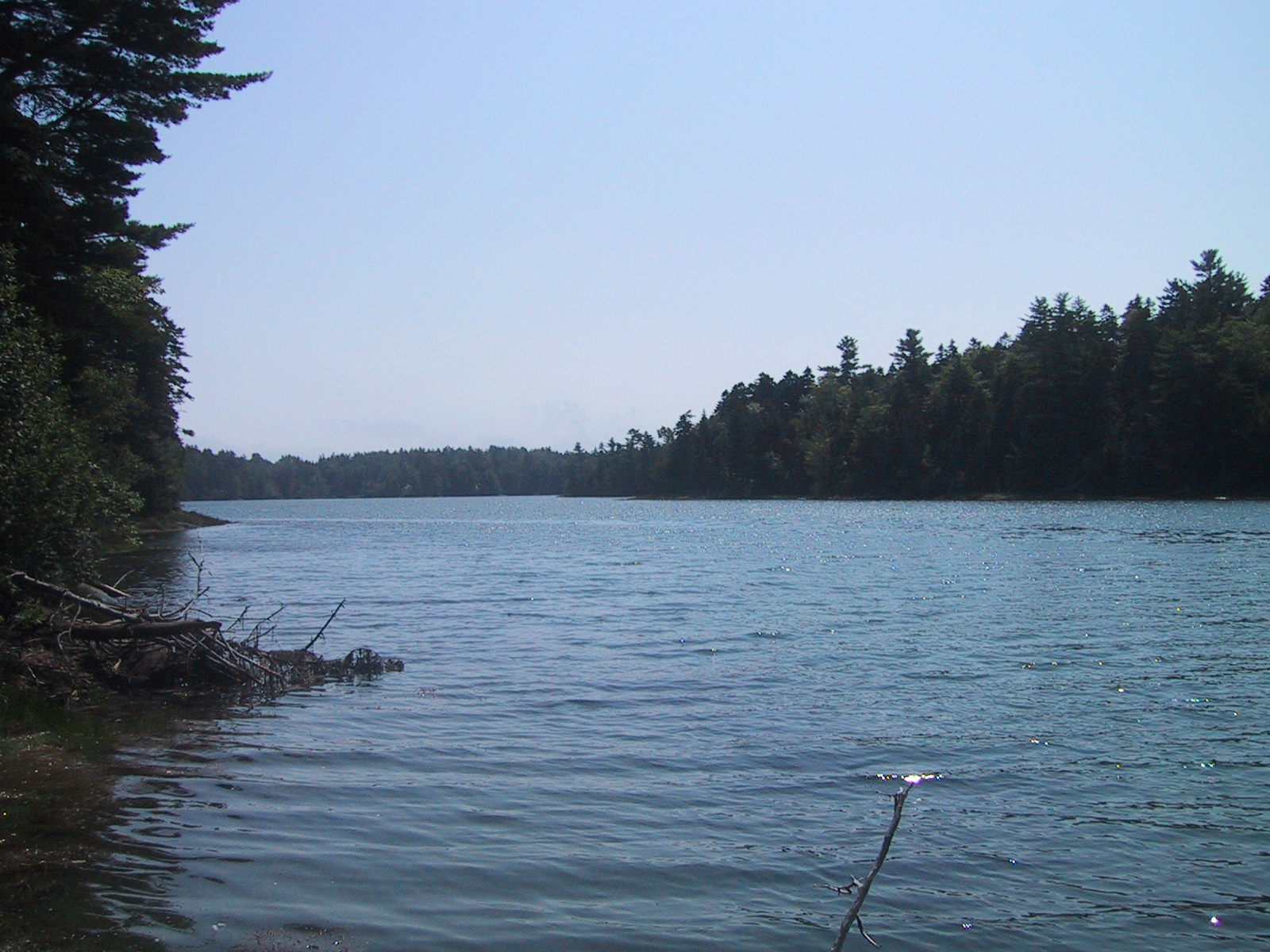
- Low tide High tide

- Location within Maine
- Interactive map of Cobscook Bay State Park
- Location: Edmunds, East Central Washington, Maine, United States
- Coordinates: 44°50′36″N 67°9′30″W
- Area: 871 acres (352 ha)
- Elevation: 157 ft (48 m)
- Established: 1964
- Administrator: Maine Department of Agriculture, Conservation and Forestry
- Website: Official website
- Maine State Parks

Cobscook Bay State Park is a public recreation area occupying 888 acres (359 ha) on the western shore of Cobscook Bay in Washington County, Maine. The park offers a view of dramatically changing tides that on average can rise to 24 feet (7.3 m) high with some reaching as high as 28 feet (8.5 m). The name Cobscook is a Maliseet-Passamaquoddy word for boiling tides. The state park is located on Whiting Bay approximately 6 miles (9.7 km) south of Dennysville and 6 miles (9.7 km) north of Whiting. It is managed by the Maine Department of Agriculture, Conservation and Forestry.

== History ==
The park was created in 1964 when the Federal government offered to lease to the state of Maine lands that remain part of Moosehorn National Wildlife Refuge. The long-term agreement was arranged at no cost to the state.

== Activities and amenities ==
The park offers hiking trails, picnicking, camping, boat launch, and bird watching. Over 200 species of birds have been noted, including the American bald eagle.
