= Roque Bluffs, Maine =

Town in Maine, United States

- Town
- Location within Maine Location within the United States
- Coordinates: 44°37′24″N 67°30′28″W
- Country: United States
- State: Maine
- County: Washington

Area
  - Total: 19.53 sq mi (50.58 km^{2})
  - Land: 10.39 sq mi (26.91 km^{2})
  - Water: 9.14 sq mi (23.67 km^{2})
- Elevation: 49 ft (15 m)

Population (2020)
  - Total: 296
  - Density: 28/sq mi (11/km^{2})
- Time zone: UTC-5 (Eastern (EST))
- ZIP code: 04654
- Area code: 207
- FIPS code: 23-63940
- GNIS feature ID: 582701

Roque Bluffs is a town in Washington County, Maine, United States. The population was 296 at the 2020 census. The town is home to Roque Bluffs State Park.

== Geography ==
According to the United States Census Bureau, the town has a total area of 19.53 square miles (50.58 km^{2}), of which 10.39 square miles (26.91 km^{2}) is land and 9.14 square miles (23.67 km^{2}) is water.

== Demographics ==
Historical population
Census	Pop.	Note	%±
1900	168		—
1910	105		−37.5%
1920	98		−6.7%
1930	108		10.2%
1940	120		11.1%
1950	80		−33.3%
1960	152		90.0%
1970	153		0.7%
1980	244		59.5%
1990	234		−4.1%
2000	264		12.8%
2010	303		14.8%
2020	296		−2.3%
U.S. Decennial Census

=== 2010 census ===
As of the census of 2010, there were 303 people, 139 households, and 91 families living in the town. The population density was 29.2 inhabitants per square mile (11.3/km^{2}). There were 273 housing units at an average density of 26.3 per square mile (10.2/km^{2}). The racial makeup of the town was 98.3% White, 0.7% African American, 0.7% Native American, and 0.3% from two or more races. Hispanic or Latino of any race were 0.3% of the population.

There were 139 households, of which 20.9% had children under the age of 18 living with them, 58.3% were married couples living together, 4.3% had a female householder with no husband present, 2.9% had a male householder with no wife present, and 34.5% were non-families. 28.1% of all households were made up of individuals, and 12.9% had someone living alone who was 65 years of age or older. The average household size was 2.18 and the average family size was 2.55.

The median age in the town was 51.7 years. 17.8% of residents were under the age of 18; 2.4% were between the ages of 18 and 24; 17.2% were from 25 to 44; 40.3% were from 45 to 64; and 22.4% were 65 years of age or older. The gender makeup of the town was 50.2% male and 49.8% female.

=== 2000 census ===
As of the census of 2000, there were 264 people, 118 households, and 82 families living in the town. The population density was 24.8 people per square mile (9.6/km^{2}). There were 226 housing units at an average density of 21.2 per square mile (8.2/km^{2}). The racial makeup of the town was 99.24% White, 0.38% African American, and 0.38% from two or more races.

There were 118 households, out of which 18.6% had children under the age of 18 living with them, 61.9% were married couples living together, 6.8% had a female householder with no husband present, and 29.7% were non-families. 22.0% of all households were made up of individuals, and 14.4% had someone living alone who was 65 years of age or older. The average household size was 2.24 and the average family size was 2.58.

In the town, the population was spread out, with 14.8% under the age of 18, 4.5% from 18 to 24, 30.3% from 25 to 44, 27.3% from 45 to 64, and 23.1% who were 65 years of age or older. The median age was 46 years. For every 100 females, there were 97.0 males. For every 100 females age 18 and over, there were 99.1 males.

The median income for a household in the town was $21,500, and the median income for a family was $29,286. Males had a median income of $31,250 versus $25,417 for females. The per capita income for the town was $15,610. About 27.2% of families and 27.2% of the population were below the poverty line, including none of those under the age of eighteen and 21.8% of those 65 or over.
