= Bradbury Mountain State Park =

State park in Cumberland County, Maine

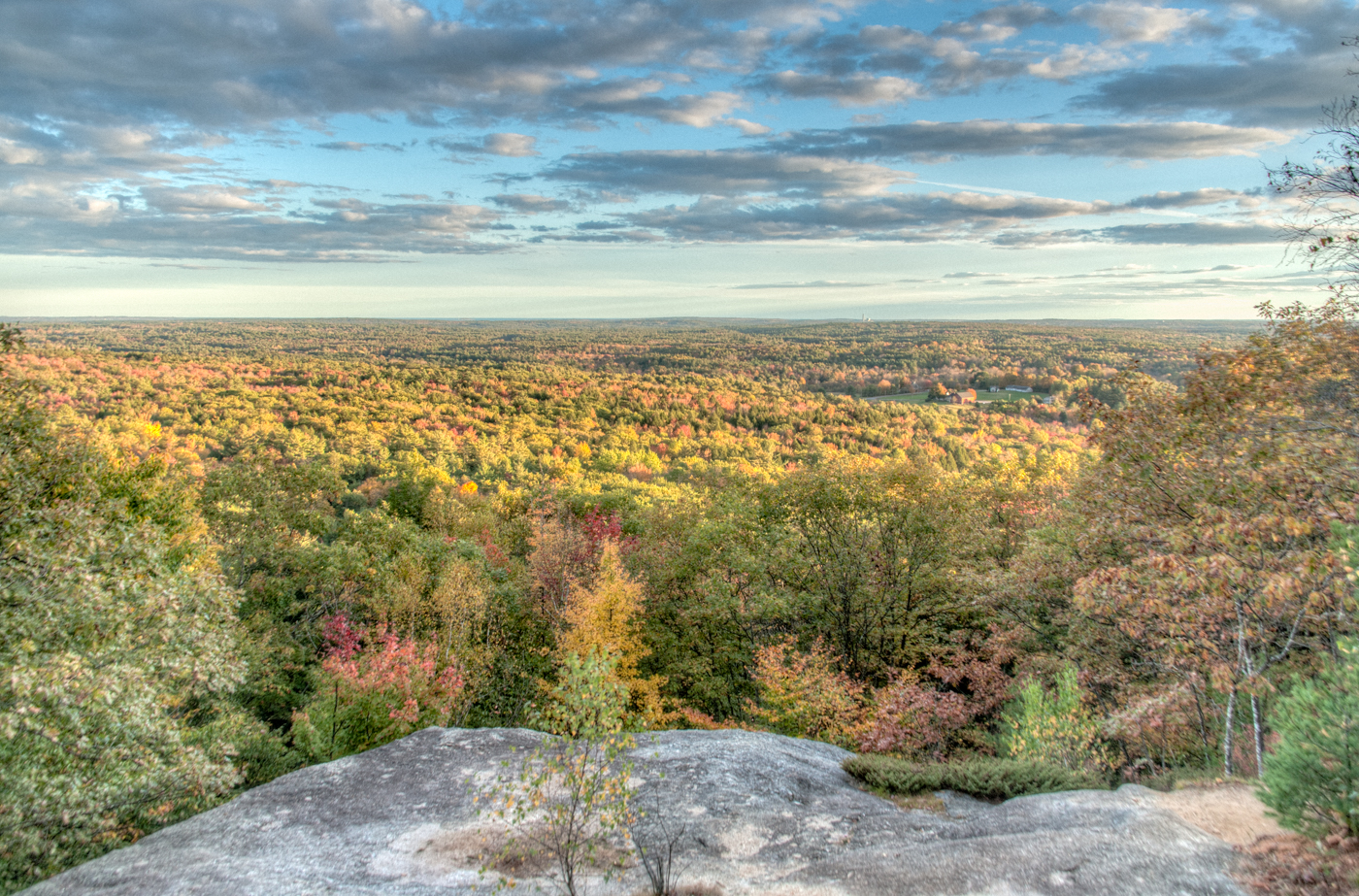

- Location within Maine
- Interactive map of Bradbury Mountain State Park
- Location: Pownal, Maine, United States
- Coordinates: 43°54′8″N 70°10′54″W
- Area: 730 acres (300 ha)
- Elevation: 486 ft (148 m)
- Established: 1939
- Administrator: Maine Department of Agriculture, Conservation and Forestry
- Website: Official website
- Maine State Parks

Bradbury Mountain State Park is a public recreation area in the town of Pownal, Cumberland County, Maine, managed by the Department of Agriculture, Conservation and Forestry. The state park covers 730 acres (300 ha).

== History ==
The park was created in the 1940s as one of Maine's original five state parks after the land was acquired from the Federal government in 1939. The park's borders were extended across Maine Route 9 with the addition of the Knight Woods parcels in the 1990s and 2000s.

== Geology ==
The park's namesake has been described as a "small, inconspicuous hill, less than 500' high," that despite its size offers panoramic views that make the park one of the more popular ones in the state. The underlying material of granite and pegmatite is exposed at the summit.

== Activities and amenities ==
The park's multi-use trails are used for hiking, snowmobiling and horseback riding. Most trails in the park are open to mountain bikers. Hiking is popular during all seasons, including winter.
