= Lily Bay State Park =

State park in Piscataquis County, Maine

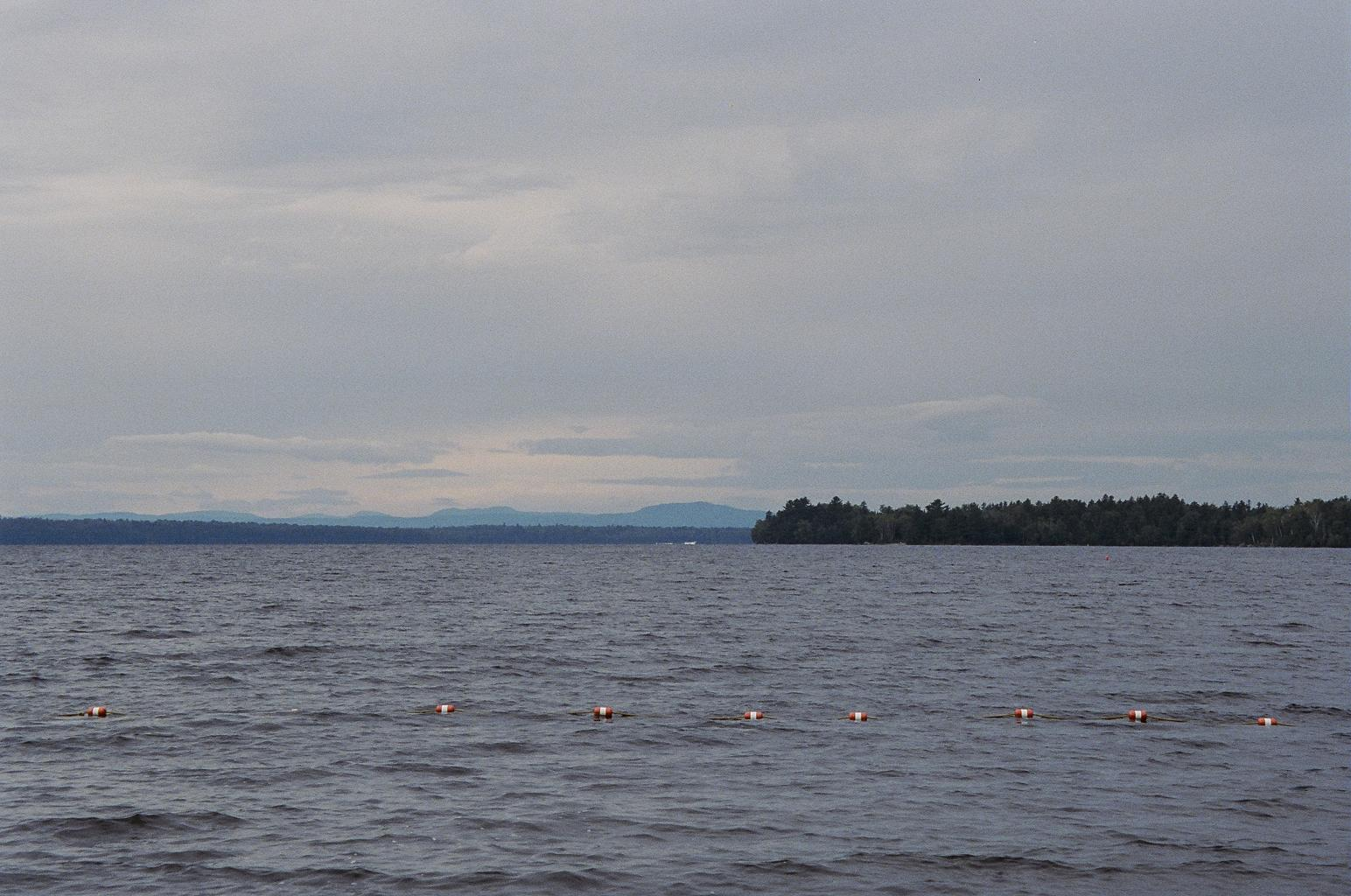

- Location within Maine
- Interactive map of Lily Bay State Park
- Location: Greenville, Maine, United States
- Coordinates: 45°34′08″N 69°32′18″W
- Area: 924 acres (374 ha)
- Elevation: 1,040 ft (320 m)
- Established: 1959
- Administrator: Maine Department of Agriculture, Conservation and Forestry
- Website: Official website
- Maine State Parks

Lily Bay State Park is a state park in the town of Greenville, Piscataquis County, Maine. It is located on the shores of Lily Bay in the southeast part of Moosehead Lake, the largest lake in New England. Lily Bay was named for the wild lilies near its shores. The park occupies 924 acres (374 ha). It was established in 1961 on woodland primarily donated by the Scott Paper Company in 1959. In July 1962, the park was officially dedicated by Gov. John H. Reed.

The park offers camping, boating, fishing, swimming, and snowmobiling. A two-mile trail used for hiking, snowshoeing, and cross-country skiing follows the shore of the lake. The park was one of five Maine State Parks that were in the path of totality for the 2024 solar eclipse, with 3 minutes and 14 seconds of totality.
