= Deboullie Public Lands =

Public land reserve in Maine

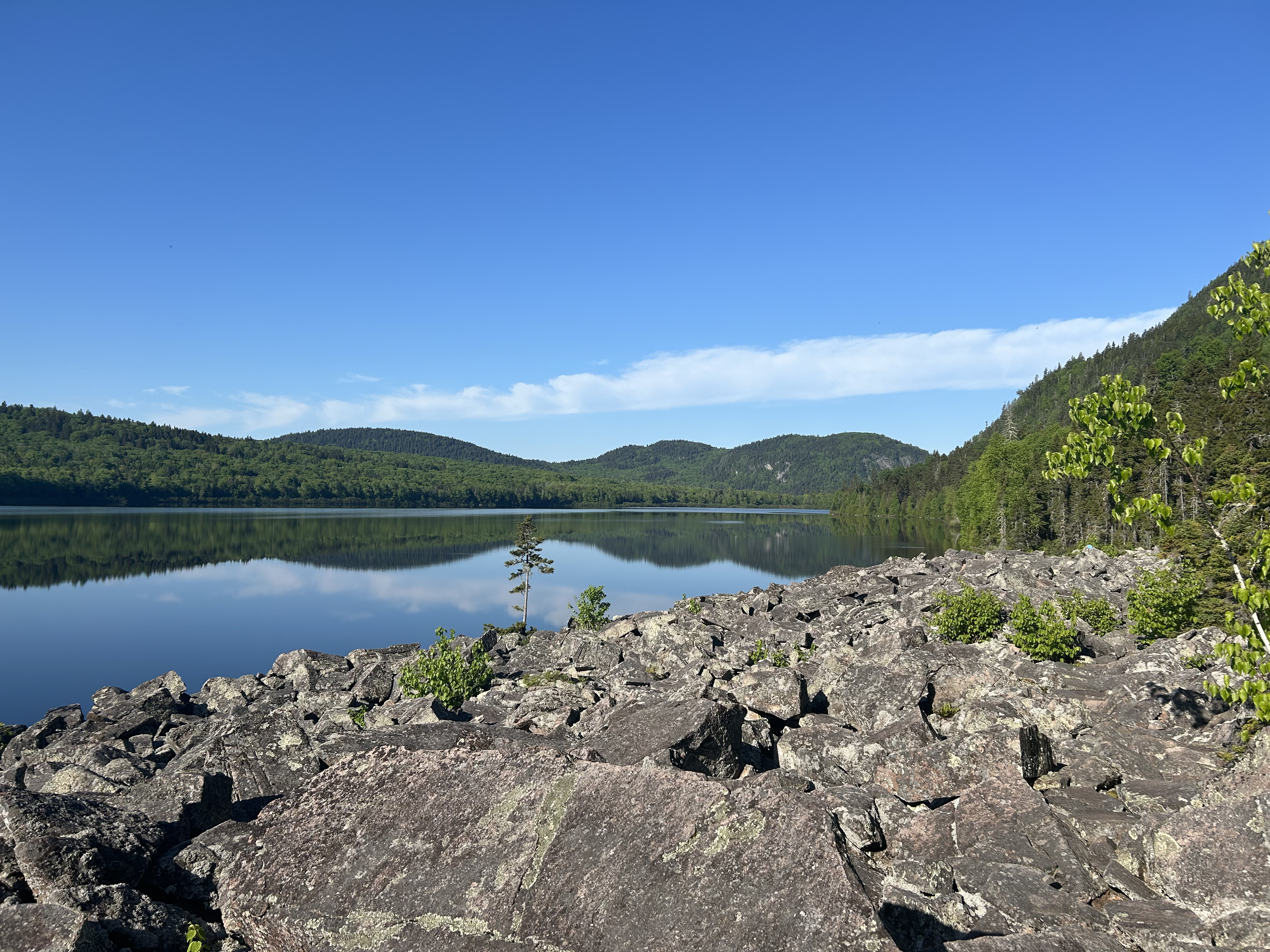
Deboullie Pond

Deboullie Public Land is a 21,871 acres (8,851 ha) public land reserve in northwestern Aroostook County, Maine. It occupies T15R9, 30 mi (48 km) from the Canadian border east of the Allagash Wilderness Waterway. Deboullie is accessed through logging roads via Route 161 from the north and Route 11 from the south. Fees are charged at the North Maine Woods Recreational system checkpoints. The public land is part of the North Maine Woods organization. Deboullie is a first-come first serve basis with minimal facilities for nature preservation. Fishing, boating, camping, and hiking are popular activities in Deboullie.

== Geography and wildlife ==
Deboullie is home to animals seen all throughout Maine and Canada. These include: moose, black bear, northern bog lemming, snowshoe hare, mayfly, bald eagles, red squirrels, white-tailed deer, landlocked salmon, and native brook trout. Deboullie lakes also house the blueblack trout (also known as the landlocked arctic charr), the northernmost fish species in the world.

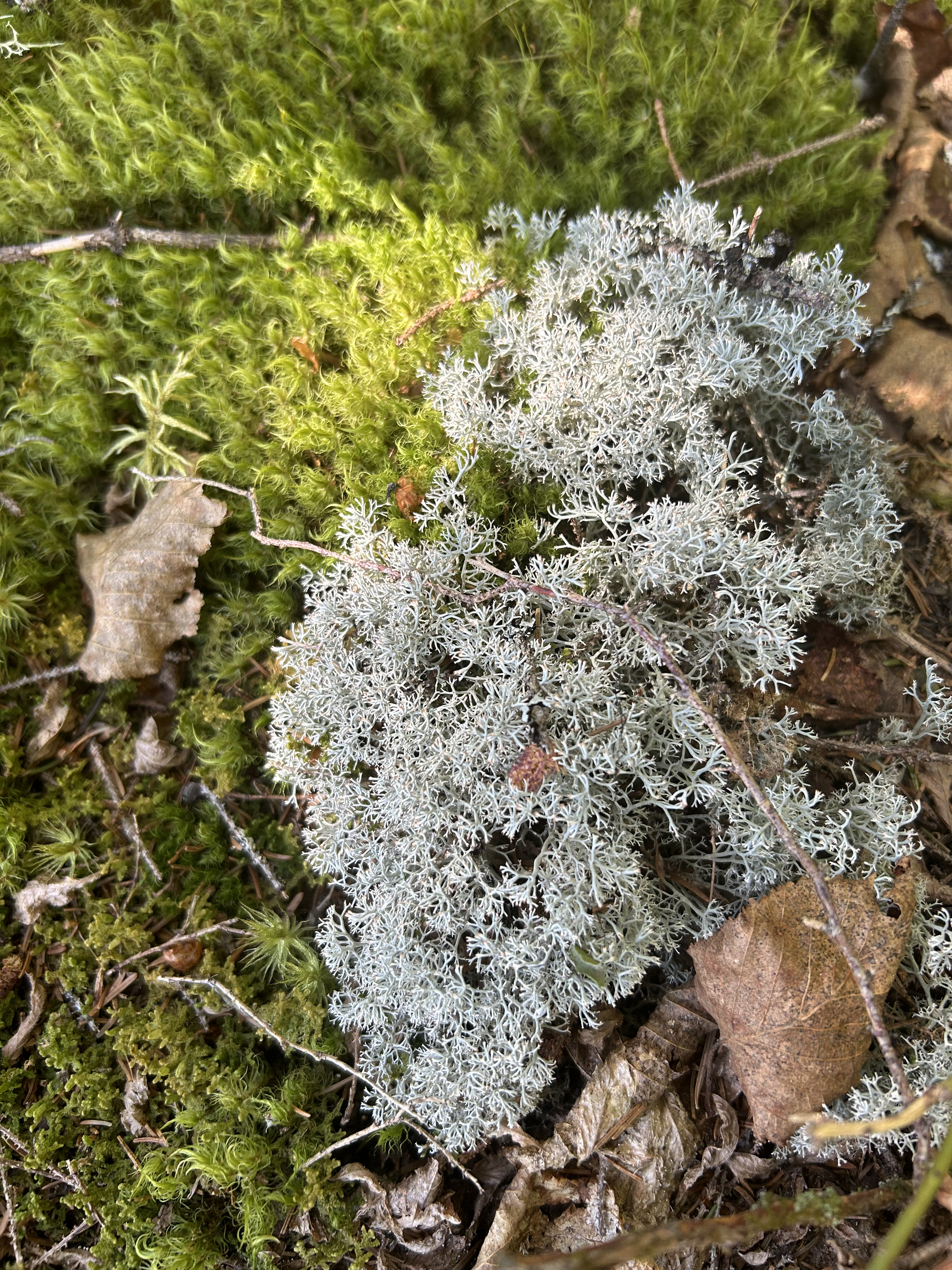
Reindeer lichens (cladonia stellaris)

Deboullie's natural communities include: spruce rocky woodland, riverside seep, northern hardwoods forest, lower elevation spruce-fir forest, evergreen seepage forest, cold-air talus slope, and circumneutral outcrop. Crater pond is an example of the talus slope, an environment that hosts biodiversity usually native to arctic or alpine regions. Blueberries can be found on the mountains. Rare plants found in Deboullie include: alpine rush, arctic sandwort, few-flowered spikerush, fragrant cliff wood-fern, northern slender pondweed, northern woodsia, smooth woodsia, labrador tea shrub, rock polydoly fern, and dwarf black spruce trees. One example is the reindeer lichens, a plant that combines fungus and green algae to be an important source of food for reindeer.

== History ==
"Deboullie" comes from the French word "débouler," meaning to tumble down, referring to the rocks that seem to slide against the mountains. Multiple natural processes formed the features of Deboullie. 370 million years ago molten rock emerged through layers of slate to create the mountain tops. 12,000-25,000 years ago glacier movement created crevices, valleys, and cliffs. Erosion created the rock fields surrounding the ponds.

Due to no running water, Deboullie was likely never occupied permanently. For 12,000 years the Wabanaki people used the lands for hunting and fishing. In the mid 1800s European settlers arrived and logged the land. Around 1910-1920 two mills were established. In 1975, the State of Maine acquired the area as part of a land trade with the Great Northern Nekoosa Corporation. From then onwards it remained preserved grounds for logging, recreation, and research.

== Recreation and research ==
Deboullie public lands are used for fishing, boating, camping, and hiking. There is a 12 mi (19 km) trail network throughout the land and Deboullie Mountain is the highest point at 1981 feet. While accessing Deboullie lands, it is recommended to yield to logging trucks. Deboullie is also home to geological research by the University of Maine at Presque Isle due to the microclimates on its rock glaciers.
