= Warren Island State Park =

State park in Waldo County, Maine

- Location within Maine
- Interactive map of Warren Island State Park
- Location: Islesboro, Maine, United States
- Coordinates: 44°16′21″N 68°56′43″W
- Area: 70 acres (28 ha)
- Elevation: 52 ft (16 m)
- Established: 1958
- Administrator: Maine Department of Agriculture, Conservation and Forestry
- Website: Official website
- Maine State Parks

Warren Island State Park is state-owned island and public recreation area on Penobscot Bay in the town of Islesboro, Waldo County, Maine, United States. The 70-acre (28 ha) state park sits about ½-mile from Islesboro Island and 3 miles (4.8 km) offshore from the mainland at Lincolnville. The island was acquired by the state of Maine for one dollar in 1958. Hiking trails, campsites, and open-faced shelters are found on the island; a pier allows access by private boat.
