= St. George Lake =

Lake in Waldo County, Maine, United States

- Location in Maine
- Location: Waldo County, Maine
- Coordinates: 44°23′15″N 69°20′09″W
- Primary outflows: St. George River
- Basin countries: United States
- Max. length: 2.5 mi (4.0 km)
- Max. width: 1.2 mi (1.9 km)
- Surface area: 1,017 acres (412 ha; 1.589 sq mi)
- Max. depth: 65 ft (20 m)
- Surface elevation: 505 ft (154 m)
- Islands: Green, Hawaii 2, Millstone, Pratt

St. George Lake is the fourth largest lake in Waldo County, Maine, United States. It is in the township of Liberty, on the western side of Waldo County. Lake St. George State Park is on the northwest shore of the lake. It contains the island of Hawaii 2.

The lake is populated with at least 14 species of fish, including salmon, brook trout (stocked since 1980), and smallmouth bass.

== See also ==
- List of lakes in Maine
