= Islesboro, Maine =

Town in Waldo County, Maine, United States

- Town
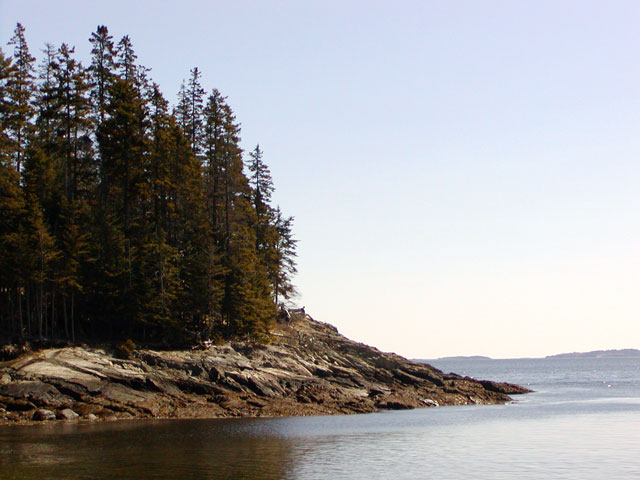
- Pendleton Point

- Seal

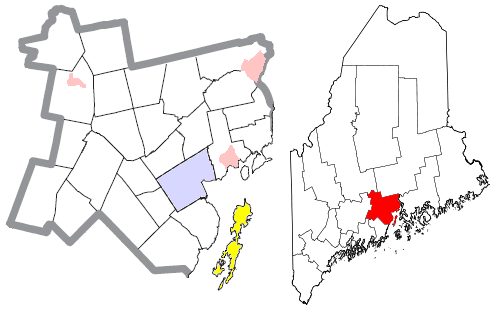
- Location of Islesboro (in yellow) in Waldo County, and Waldo County (red) in the state of Maine
- Coordinates: 44°17′50″N 68°54′12″W
- Country: United States
- State: Maine
- County: Waldo
- Incorporated: 1789

Area
  - Total: 68.88 sq mi (178.40 km^{2})
  - Land: 14.29 sq mi (37.01 km^{2})
  - Water: 54.59 sq mi (141.39 km^{2})
- Elevation: 82 ft (25 m)

Population (2020)
  - Total: 583
  - Density: 41/sq mi (15.8/km^{2})
- Time zone: UTC−5 (Eastern (EST))
  - Summer (DST): UTC−4 (EDT)
- ZIP Code: 04848
- Area code: 207
- FIPS code: 23-35240
- GNIS feature ID: 582531
- Website: www.townofislesboro.com

Islesboro is a town in Waldo County, Maine, United States, comprising Islesboro Island and several smaller islands. The population was 583 at the 2020 census. It has a summer colony accessible by state ferry service from Lincolnville Beach three miles to the west, by private boat, or by air taxi service. Home to Warren Island State Park, Islesboro includes the village of Dark Harbor.

== History ==
The Penobscot people called it Pitaubegwimenahanuk, meaning "the island that lies between two channels", although André Thevet recorded the name Aiayascon in 1556. It was part of the Waldo Patent. First called Long Island Plantation, it was settled in 1769. It was incorporated as Islesborough on January 28, 1789, although over time the spelling was contracted to Islesboro.

With many harbors and coves, the island was home to the largest commercial shipping fleet in the bay during the 19th century. Following the Civil War, however, Islesboro developed as a resort community, and many large and luxurious summer homes were built. Their large yachts cruised and raced throughout the Gulf of Maine. The town remains an upper-class enclave and summer colony.

== Geography ==
=== Islands and villages ===
Situated in upper Penobscot Bay, the island town separates East from West Penobscot Bay. Islesboro Island is narrow, mainly north-south and 14 miles long. Smaller islands include Job Island, Seven Hundred Acre Island, Spruce Island, Warren Island, Seal Island, Ram Island, Thrumcap, Middle Island, Minot Island, Ensign Island (#1 and #2), Lime Island, Flat Island, Hutchins Island, Little Island, Little Bermuda, Joe's Rock, and Birch Point. Semi-submerged features include Haskell Ledge, Minor Ledge, and Minot Island Ledge.

The main island consists of two wider landmasses separated by a narrow isthmus called The Narrows. Neighborhoods and villages (small clusters of buildings) are distributed across the two:

- Up Island, the northern landmass
  - Pripet, also known as Warren's Landing or Beckett's Landing – the historic site of a kiln and steamboat wharf
  - North Islesboro – historic village and current site of a general store
  - Ryder's Cove – historic summer vacation spot and steamboat destination
- Down Island, the southern landmass
  - Islesboro Village, also known as Guinea Village – near Islesboro Harbor
  - Hewes Point – historic summer vacation spot and steamboat destination
  - Town Center – town offices, community center, and post office
  - Grindle Point – current ferry landing, with historic lighthouse
  - Dark Harbor – historic summer vacation spot and steamboat destination

=== Size and features ===
According to the United States Census Bureau, the town has a total area of 68.88 square miles (178.40 km^{2}), of which 14.29 square miles (37.01 km^{2}) is land and 54.59 square miles (141.39 km^{2}) is water.

There is one large pond, called Meadow Pond, in the northern portion of the Island, the work of beavers that have dammed a narrow place. Ice was once harvested from this pond for export to places as far away as India. Hewes Point was named for Paola Hewes, an early pioneer settler.

=== Climate ===
This climatic region is typified by large seasonal temperature differences, with warm to hot (and often humid) summers and cold (sometimes severely cold) winters. According to the Köppen Climate Classification system, Islesboro has a humid continental climate, abbreviated "Dfb" on climate maps.

== Demographics ==
Historical population
| Census | Pop. | Note | %± |
|---|---|---|---|
| 1830 | 674 | | — |
| 1840 | 777 | | 15.3% |
| 1850 | 984 | | 26.6% |
| 1860 | 1,276 | | 29.7% |
| 1870 | 1,230 | | −3.6% |
| 1880 | 1,208 | | −1.8% |
| 1890 | 1,006 | | −16.7% |
| 1900 | 923 | | −8.3% |
| 1910 | 877 | | −5.0% |
| 1920 | 637 | | −27.4% |
| 1930 | 697 | | 9.4% |
| 1940 | 718 | | 3.0% |
| 1950 | 529 | | −26.3% |
| 1960 | 444 | | −16.1% |
| 1970 | 421 | | −5.2% |
| 1980 | 521 | | 23.8% |
| 1990 | 579 | | 11.1% |
| 2000 | 603 | | 4.1% |
| 2010 | 566 | | −6.1% |
| 2020 | 583 | | 3.0% |
U.S. Decennial Census

=== 2010 census ===
As of the census of 2010, there were 566 people, 270 households, and 161 families living in the town. The population density was 39.6 inhabitants per square mile (15.3/km^{2}). There were 850 housing units at an average density of 59.5 per square mile (23.0/km^{2}). The racial makeup of the town was 97.9% White, 0.7% African American, 0.2% Native American, 0.2% Asian, 0.5% from other races, and 0.5% from two or more races. Hispanic or Latino of any race were 0.9% of the population.

There were 270 households, of which 20.7% had children under the age of 18 living with them, 46.7% were married couples living together, 7.0% had a female householder with no husband present, 5.9% had a male householder with no wife present, and 40.4% were non-families. Of all households 34.4% were made up of individuals, and 15.2% had someone living alone who was 65 years of age or older. The average household size was 2.07 and the average family size was 2.57.

The median age in the town was 52.1 years. 17.3% of residents were under the age of 18; 3.4% were between the ages of 18 and 24; 17.4% were from 25 to 44; 37.5% were from 45 to 64; and 24.4% were 65 years of age or older. The gender makeup of the town was 48.2% male and 51.8% female.

=== 2000 census ===
As of the census of 2000, there were 603 people, 280 households, and 176 families living in the town. The population density was 42.3 inhabitants per square mile (16.3/km^{2}). There were 741 housing units at an average density of 52.0 per square mile (20.1/km^{2}). The racial makeup of the town was 98.18% White, 0.17% African American, 0.17% Native American, 0.17% Asian, 0.50% from other races, and 0.83% from two or more races. Hispanic or Latino of any race were 1.33% of the population.

There were 280 households, out of which 25.0% had children under the age of 18 living with them, 53.2% were married couples living together, 5.7% had a female householder with no husband present, and 36.8% were non-families. Of all households 30.7% were made up of individuals, and 13.6% had someone living alone who was 65 years of age or older. The average household size was 2.15 and the average family size was 2.69.

In the town, the population was spread out, with 20.2% under the age of 18, 3.3% from 18 to 24, 25.4% from 25 to 44, 31.2% from 45 to 64, and 19.9% who were 65 years of age or older. The median age was 46 years. For every 100 females, there were 97.1 males. For every 100 females age 18 and over, there were 97.1 males.

The median income for a household in the town was $39,643, and the median income for a family was $48,750. Males had a median income of $35,000 versus $24,750 for females. The per capita income for the town was $25,653. About 5.5% of families and 7.2% of the population were below the poverty line, including 8.3% of those under age 18 and 9.7% of those age 65 or over.

== Education ==
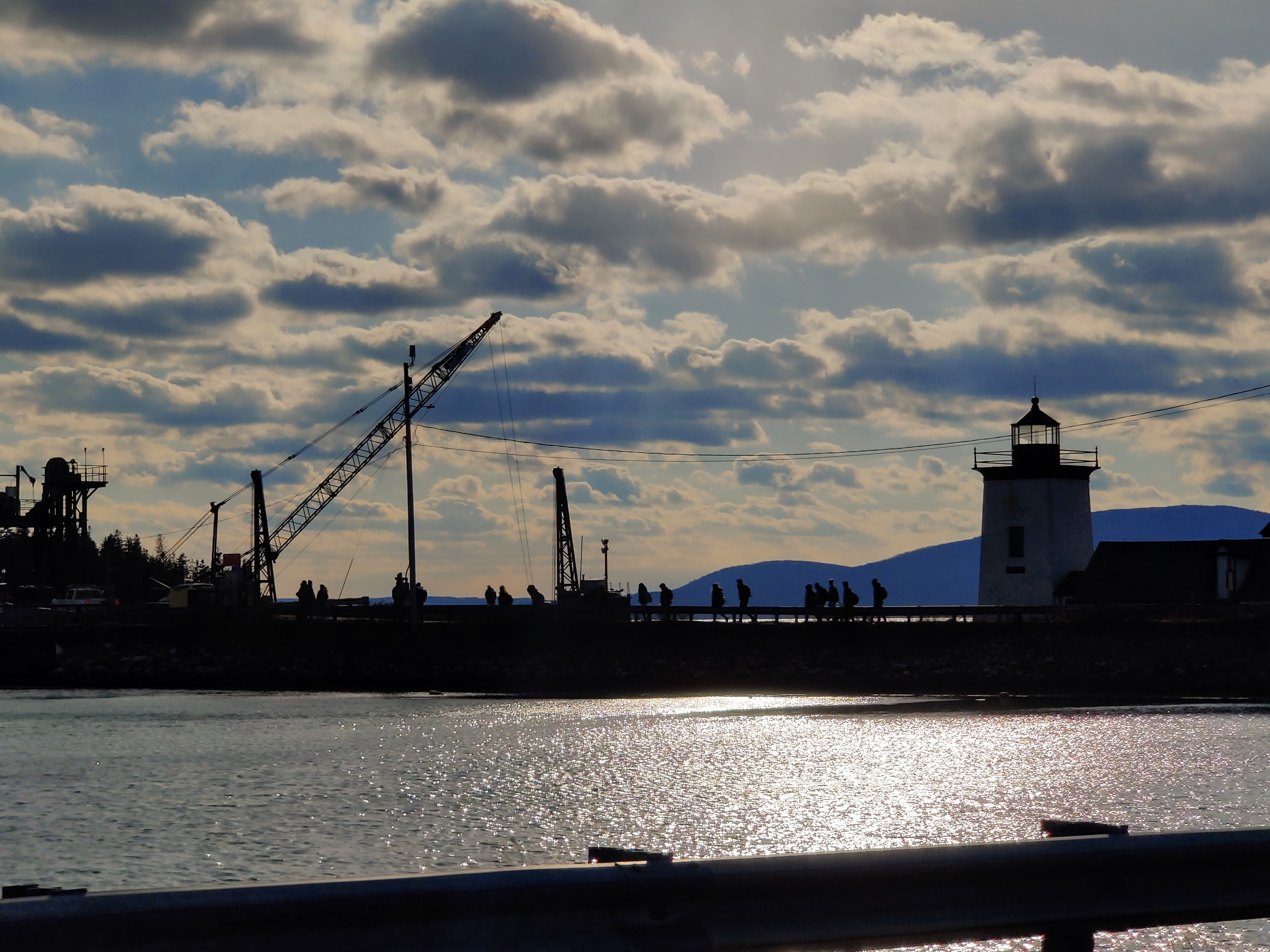
Schoolchildren in Islesboro, ME boarding the ferry.

Islesboro Central School is one of five island schools in Maine that cover all grades (K–12), the others being North Haven, Vinalhaven, Mount Desert Island, and Deer Isle. It is also unique that it allows mainland students to pay tuition to attend from grades 5 through 12. The "magnet" students, and some teachers, who live on the mainland take the ferry across every morning where they are met with a school bus to take them to school. Students come from a range of midcoast towns to attend ICS. Currently, 18 magnet students from grades 5-12 pay tuition and commute daily, joining 51 island students to form the school community of approximately 82 students.

The school maintains a student-to-teacher ratio of approximately 5:1 and offers Advanced Placement courses. According to recent assessments, 85% of students scored at or above proficient in math and 95% in reading, both exceeding Maine state averages. The school is a member of the Busline League for middle school sports, and is in Class D, South, in the Maine Principals' Association. The competitive sports offered through the school include cross country running, sailing, soccer, basketball, and Ultimate Frisbee.

== Notable people ==
- Winthrop Aldrich, banker and US Ambassador to the UK
- Kirstie Alley, actress
- John Judson Ames, editor of the first newspaper in San Diego, California
- Honor Blackman, actress
- C. Douglas Dillon, diplomat and politician
- Joan Dillon, American born duchess and princess
- Ruth Draper, dramatist
- Charles Dana Gibson, illustrator
- Isabel Gillies, actress and author
- Ved Mehta, author
- Sister Parish, interior decorator
- Kelly Preston, actress
- George Stevens Jr., film director
- John Train, investment advisor and author
- John Travolta, actor
- Lily Tuck, writer

== See also ==
- Up-island spider
- List of islands of Maine
