= Kennebec Highlands =

Protected area in Maine, United States

Coordinates: 44°33′N 69°57′W

The Kennebec Highlands is a protected area in central Maine.

The Highlands comprises about 6,400 acres (26 km^{2}), mostly in the town of Vienna. It also includes land in Rome, Mount Vernon, and New Sharon. The area is roughly bounded by State Route 27, Watson Pond Rd., Belgrade Rd., and Kimball Pond Rd., plus extensions east of Watson Pond Rd. to Long Pond. It takes its name from its hills, which include McGaffey Mountain, the 1,310-foot (400 m) summit of which is the highest point of Kennebec County.

The Belgrade Regional Conservation Alliance (BRCA) began the effort to protect the area from development in 1999, assisted by a grant from the Land for Maine's Future (LMF) Program. By 2004, it had bought or acquired conservation easements on 5,600 acres (23 km^{2}).

The Kennebec Highlands includes about 18 miles (30 km) of trails suitable for hiking, mountain biking, and snowmobiling.
