= Cobscook Bay =

Bay in Maine, United States

Coordinates: 44°54′52″N 67°03′05″W

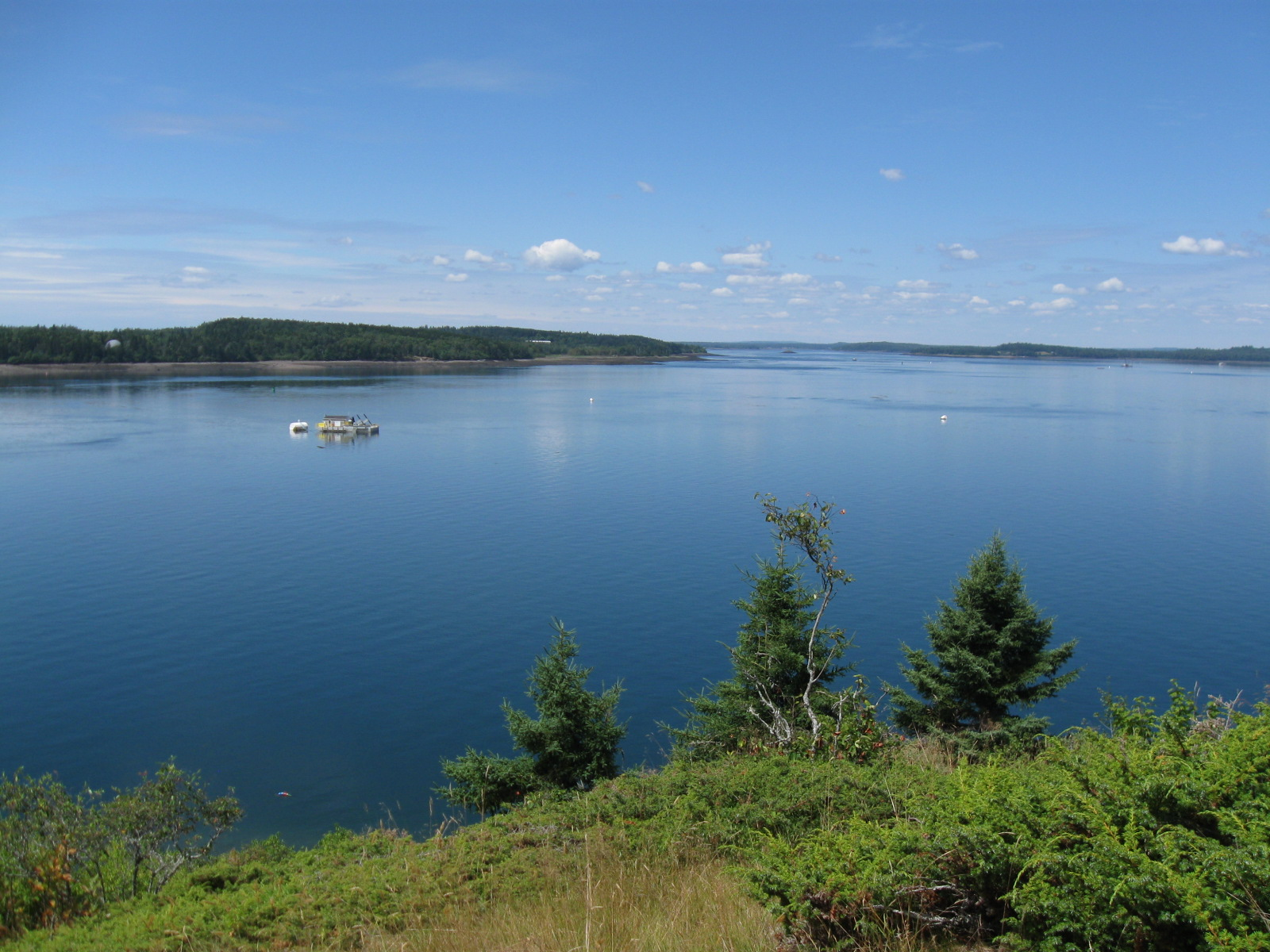
Looking west into Cobscook Bay from Shackford Head State Park in Eastport

Cobscook Bay is located in Washington County in the state of Maine. It opens into Passamaquoddy Bay, within the Bay of Fundy. Cobscook Bay is immediately south of the island city of Eastport, the main island of which (Moose Island) straddles the two bays. In the 1930s, Cobscook Bay was part of the aborted Passamaquoddy Bay Tidal Power Project (a.k.a., Quoddy Dam Project) to generate electricity from its large tidal range.

== Geography ==
Cobscook Bay is a large bay in Washington County, Maine that opens into Passamaquoddy Bay within the Bay of Fundy through a relatively narrow opening. It is about 10 miles (16 km) long and 10 wide and has a long, convoluted coastline with many islands. The mouth of the bay is bracketed by the island city of Eastport, which is principally on Moose Island, and by the town of Lubec. Other townships around the bay are Perry, Pembroke, Dennysville, Edmunds, and Tresscott. There are about 7,000 people living in the nine communities in the area, many of whom are fishermen or work in fish farming, shipping or tourism. There is a scallop fishery here.

The bay is both geologically and hydrologically complex. The tide has an average range of 18.4 feet (5.6 m) (and range that can exceed 26 feet) and there are strong currents as large volumes of sea water flow into and out of the bay twice a day. The bay is very shallow with the average depth being about 10 metres (33 ft) and about one third of its area is exposed at low water. The volume of freshwater entering from streams is relatively small and the nutrient rich waters support a great diversity of phytoplankton and algae. These support a biodiverse community of fish, shellfish, marine worms and other invertebrates. Many birds feed on these and the bay is an important visiting place for migrating birds and waterfowl.

The area surrounding the bay is well-timbered, but as well as forests there are streams, lakes, bogs, marshes and mudflats interspersed by a network of trails. Cobscook Bay State Park takes up part of the shore of the bay.

== History ==
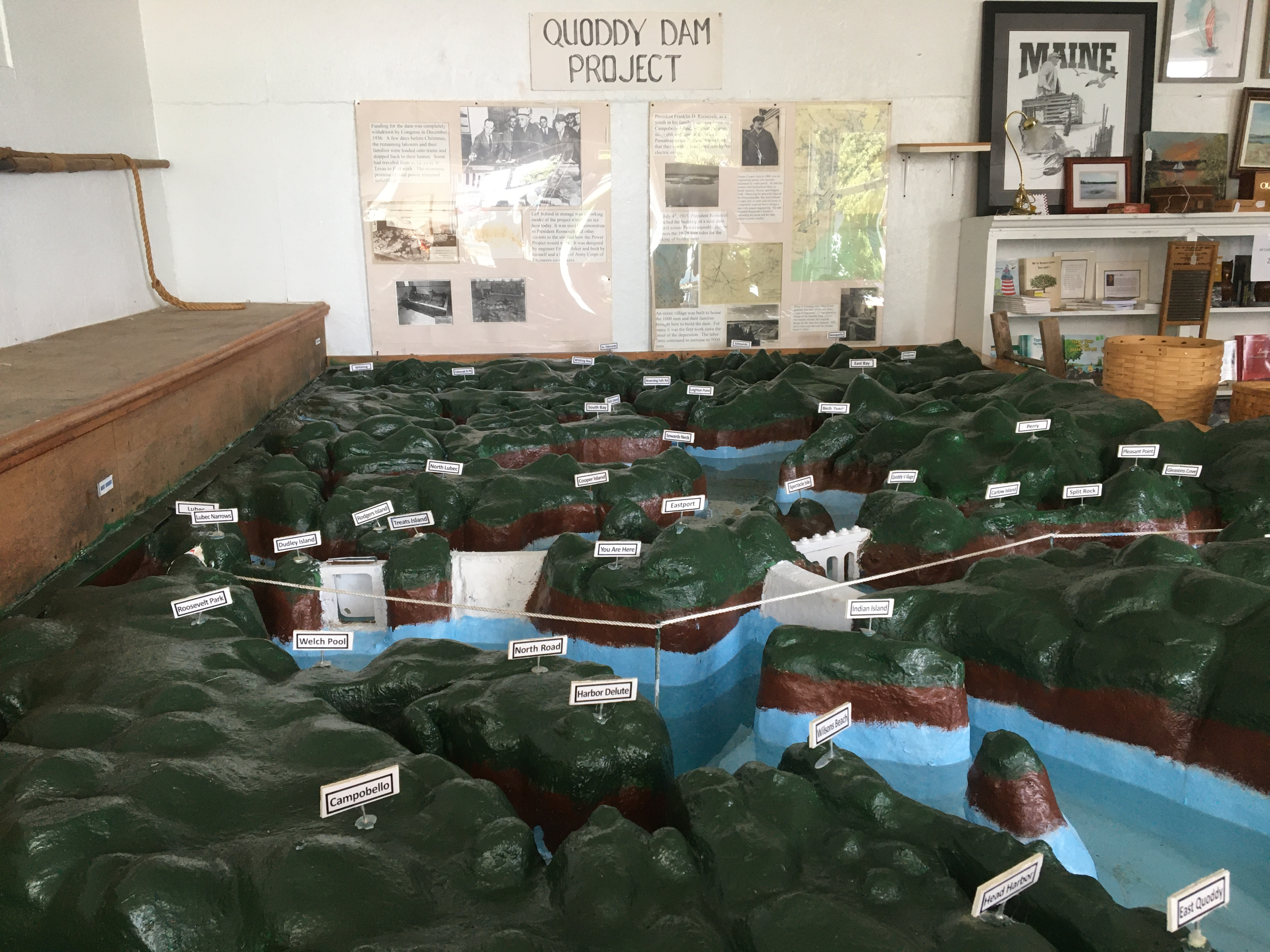
Eastport Museum Quoddy Dam Project Exhibit

Communities around the bay were traditionally involved in shipbuilding, logging, farming, fishing and trading.

In 1935, a proposal by FDR friend and engineer Dexter Cooper to build a barrage to harness the power of the tides in the area was initiated. The Quoddy Dam Project was envisaged to impound the waters of Cobscook Bay and the adjoining Passamaquoddy Bay. Construction was started and some dikes were built, but a year later, the United States Congress withdrew its support and funding and the scheme was abandoned. The Quoddy Dam Model Museum at Eastport preserves a large model of the project.

The generation of electricity from the bay's tidal currents was ultimately accomplished in September 2012 by Ocean Renewable Power Company. A turbine was installed in Cobscook Bay at the boundary of Eastport and Lubec capable of generating 180 kW of electricity, and was the first North American commercial tidal energy project to supply power to the electrical grid. The turbines did not need dams to function and were mounted on the sea bed. The turbine blades spin slowly in the current and testing seems to indicate they are harmless to marine life. Two more turbines were planned for installation in the bay within a year's time.

== Ecology ==
This coastal area is home to many resident birds. One of these is the bald eagle (Haliaeetus leucocephalus) and Cobscook Bay has more pairs of these rare birds per square mile than the rest of Maine. It also houses 25% of the state's black duck (Anas rubripes) population. In the fall, the bay is used by large numbers of birds migrating southwards from their summer breeding grounds. Rare species of bird to be seen here include the harlequin duck (Histrionicus histrionicus). An invertebrate of special concern is the mystery snail (Vertigo paradoxa), an air-breathing land snail. In the summer several species of whale enter the bay, including the minke, fin whale and right whale.

== Conservation ==
Efforts are being made to preserve the biodiversity of the bay. A 250-foot (76 m) buffer zone has been created adjacent to the foreshore where no development is allowed. The alewife (Alosa pseudoharengus) is a species of anadromous fish which goes upstream to spawn. Efforts are being made to enable these fish to reach their traditional spawning grounds in the upper waters of the Pennamaquan River, Little River and Boyden Stream. These fish are thought to be important in the bay's ecosystem by providing food for the eagles.

== Other uses of the name ==
The song "Cobscook Bay" by The Mountain Goats, from their EP Isopanisad Radio Hour, takes its name from the bay.
