= Pownal, Maine =

- Town
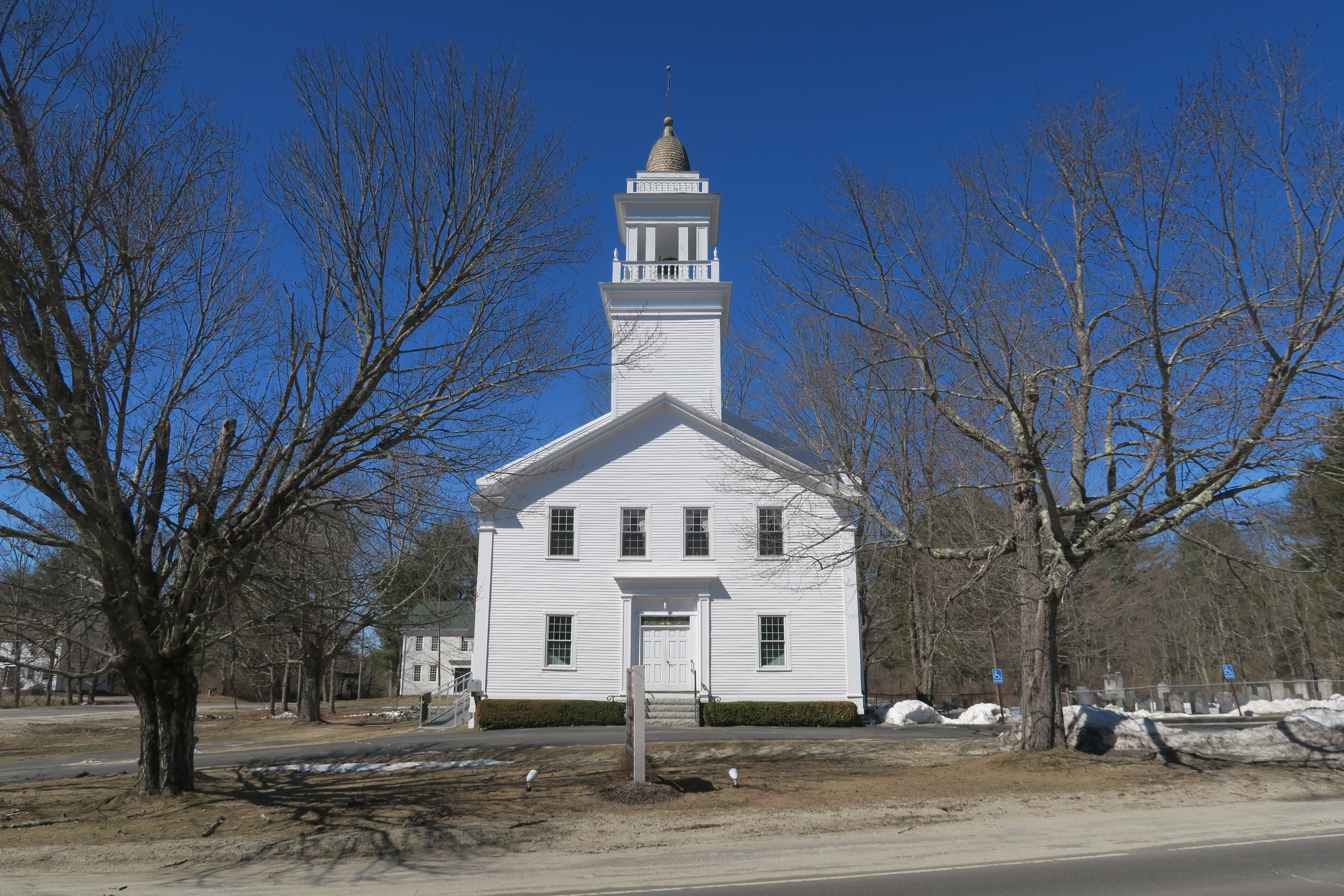
- First Parish Congregational Church

- Seal

- Location in Cumberland County and the state of Maine.
- Coordinates: 43°53′40″N 70°09′24″W
- Country: United States
- State: Maine
- County: Cumberland
- Incorporated: 1808
- Villages: North Pownal; Pownal Center; West Pownal

Area
  - Total: 22.88 sq mi (59.26 km^{2})
  - Land: 22.86 sq mi (59.21 km^{2})
  - Water: 0.019 sq mi (0.05 km^{2})
- Elevation: 207 ft (63 m)

Population (2020)
  - Total: 1,566
  - Density: 68/sq mi (26.4/km^{2})
- Time zone: UTC-5 (Eastern (EST))
  - Summer (DST): UTC-4 (EDT)
- ZIP code: 04069
- Area code: 207
- FIPS code: 23-60685
- GNIS feature ID: 582684
- Website: www.pownalmaine.org

Pownal is a town in Cumberland County, Maine, United States. Pownal was included in the Lewiston-Auburn, Maine metropolitan New England City and Town Area. The population was 1,566 at the 2020 census. It is part of the Portland–South Portland–Biddeford, Maine Metropolitan Statistical Area. Pownal is home to Bradbury Mountain State Park.

== History ==
Originally the northwest portion of Freeport, it was first settled in 1680. The town was set off and incorporated by the Massachusetts General Court on March 3, 1808, named in honor of former Governor Thomas Pownall, who had died three years before. It swapped land with the town of North Yarmouth in 1813 and 1816. With an undulating surface of generally productive soil, agriculture became the principal occupation. By 1859, when the population was 1,074, other industries included a gristmill and a carriage factory.

Pownal was chosen by author Stephen King as the hometown of schoolteacher Johnny Smith, protagonist of his 1979 novel The Dead Zone, and of Ray Garraty, protagonist of his 1979 novel The Long Walk. King grew up in neighboring Durham.

== Geography ==
According to the United States Census Bureau, the town has a total area of 22.88 square miles (59.26 km^{2}), of which 22.86 square miles (59.21 km^{2}) is land and 0.02 square miles (0.05 km^{2}) is water. Pownal is drained by the eastern branches of the Royal River.

The town is served by Maine State Route 9.

== Demographics ==
Historical population
Census	Pop.	Note	%±
1790	2,043		—
1800	1,678		−17.9%
1810	872		−48.0%
1820	1,058		21.3%
1830	1,308		23.6%
1840	1,210		−7.5%
1850	1,074		−11.2%
1860	1,053		−2.0%
1870	981		−6.8%
1880	874		−10.9%
1890	712		−18.5%
1900	592		−16.9%
1910	625		5.6%
1920	514		−17.8%
1930	462		−10.1%
1940	575		24.5%
1950	752		30.8%
1960	778		3.5%
1970	800		2.8%
1980	1,189		48.6%
1990	1,262		6.1%
2000	1,491		18.1%
2010	1,474		−1.1%
2020	1,566		6.2%
U.S. Decennial Census

=== 2010 census ===
As of the census of 2010, there were 1,474 people, 590 households, and 422 families living in the town. The population density was 64.5 inhabitants per square mile (24.9/km^{2}). There were 613 housing units at an average density of 26.8 per square mile (10.3/km^{2}). The racial makeup of the town was 97.7% White, 0.1% African American, 0.1% Native American, 0.4% Asian, 0.1% Pacific Islander, 0.3% from other races, and 1.4% from two or more races. Hispanic or Latino of any race were 0.7% of the population.

There were 590 households, of which 29.7% had children under the age of 18 living with them, 60.7% were married couples living together, 6.6% had a female householder with no husband present, 4.2% had a male householder with no wife present, and 28.5% were non-families. 20.8% of all households were made up of individuals, and 6.2% had someone living alone who was 65 years of age or older. The average household size was 2.50 and the average family size was 2.88.

The median age in the town was 44.6 years. 21.5% of residents were under the age of 18; 4.2% were between the ages of 18 and 24; 24.8% were from 25 to 44; 36.3% were from 45 to 64; and 13.2% were 65 years of age or older. The gender makeup of the town was 48.2% male and 51.8% female.

=== 2000 census ===
As of the census of 2000, there were 1,491 people, 560 households, and 437 families living in the town. The population density was 65.0 inhabitants per square mile (25.1/km^{2}). There were 567 housing units at an average density of 24.7 per square mile (9.5/km^{2}). The racial makeup of the town was 97.85% White, 0.47% African American, 0.07% Native American, 0.13% Asian, 0.27% Pacific Islander, 0.13% from other races, and 1.07% from two or more races. Hispanic or Latino of any race were 0.67% of the population.

There were 560 households, out of which 34.1% had children under the age of 18 living with them, 68.4% were married couples living together, 8.0% had a female householder with no husband present, and 21.8% were non-families. 15.4% of all households were made up of individuals, and 4.5% had someone living alone who was 65 years of age or older. The average household size was 2.66 and the average family size was 2.98.

In the town, the population was spread out, with 24.3% under the age of 18, 5.3% from 18 to 24, 28.4% from 25 to 44, 31.9% from 45 to 64, and 10.1% who were 65 years of age or older. The median age was 41 years. For every 100 females, there were 98.5 males. For every 100 females age 18 and over, there were 96.9 males.

The median income for a household in the town was $54,219, and the median income for a family was $60,000. Males had a median income of $38,000 versus $26,188 for females. The per capita income for the town was $26,691. About 2.6% of families and 4.3% of the population were below the poverty line, including 7.0% of those under age 18 and 1.5% of those age 65 or over.

== Site of interest ==
- Bradbury Mountain State Park

== Notable person ==
- Frank Knight, arborist
