= Belfast, Maine =

Town in Maine, United States

- City
- Downtown (2026)

- Seal

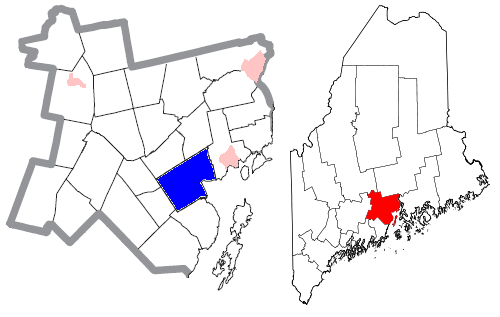
- Location of Belfast in Maine
- Coordinates: 44°24′34″N 69°01′30″W
- Country: United States
- State: Maine
- County: Waldo
- Incorporated (town): June 29, 1773
- Incorporated (city): August 17, 1850

Government
  - Type: Mayor-Council

Area
  - Total: 38.37 sq mi (99.37 km^{2})
  - Land: 34.05 sq mi (88.19 km^{2})
  - Water: 4.32 sq mi (11.18 km^{2})
- Elevation: 203 ft (62 m)

Population (2020)
  - Total: 6,938
  - Density: 203.8/sq mi (78.67/km^{2})
- Time zone: UTC-5 (EST)
  - Summer (DST): EDT
- ZIP code: 04915
- Area code: 207
- FIPS code: 23-03950
- GNIS feature ID: 582347
- Website: www.cityofbelfast.org

Belfast is a city in Waldo County, Maine, United States. As of the 2020 census, the city population was 6,938. Located at the mouth of the Passagassawakeag River estuary on Belfast Bay and Penobscot Bay. Belfast is the county seat of Waldo County.

== History ==
About 1720, General Samuel Waldo of Boston bought the Muscongus Patent, which had evolved into outright ownership of the land, and was thereafter known as the Waldo Patent. Waldo died in 1759, and his heirs would sell the plantation of Passagassawakeag (named after its river) to 35 Scots-Irish proprietors from Londonderry, New Hampshire.

Renamed after Belfast, then the principal port of embarkation for emigrants from the north of Ireland, it was settled in 1770, and incorporated as a town in 1773. The village was mostly abandoned during the Revolution while British forces occupied Bagaduce (now Castine). The British military burned Belfast in 1779, then held it for five days in September 1814 during the War of 1812.

Following the war, the seaport rebuilt and thrived. It was a port of entry, and designated county seat of Waldo County in 1827, although land would be set off in 1845 to form part of Searsport. Belfast was incorporated on August 17, 1850, as a city, the 8th in Maine, adopting its charter on April 3, 1852. It developed into a shipbuilding center, producing hundreds of three, four and five masted schooners. Materials for wooden boat construction were shipped down the Penobscot River from Bangor, the lumber capital of North America during the later 19th century.

Shipbuilders became wealthy, and built the Federal, Greek Revival and Italianate mansions and civic architecture for which the city is noted, including the 1818 First Church by master-builder Samuel French, and the 1857 Customs House and Post Office by noted architect Ammi B. Young. Mayor Axel Hayford built the Hayford Block, which included the Opera House, after a fire devastated the downtown area in 1865. It is an Italianate structure now listed on the National Register of Historic Places. Wooden ship construction would fade by about 1900, but with the advent of ice harvesting and refrigeration, the local economy shifted to distributing seafood, including lobsters, scallops, sardines, herrings and mackerel for the Boston and New York markets.

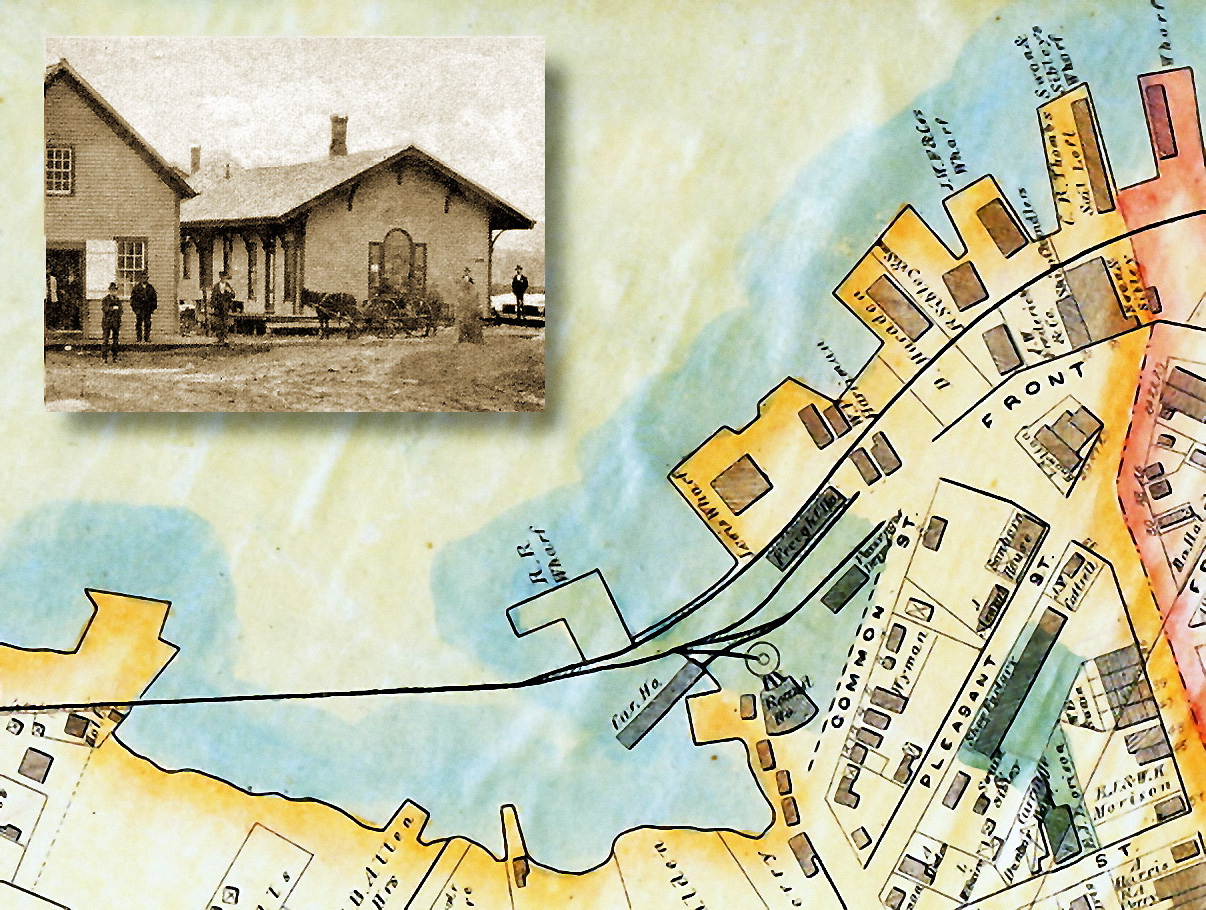
The Belfast rail yard in 1875; MEC-built station house c. 1880.

A county-wide connection to the main line of the Maine Central Railroad at Burnham, 33 miles (53 km) inland from Belfast, was established by the largely city-owned Belfast and Moosehead Lake Railroad with its opening in 1871. For the first 55 years the line was operated under lease by the MEC as its Belfast Branch but its operation reverted to the B&ML on January 1, 1926, when the lease was terminated by the larger road. Regular passenger service ended in 1960, and all operations in Belfast of any kind ceased in 2005, when the main yard was torn up.

In 2011 the grounds of the former B&ML main yard and adjacent Stinson Seafood factory became the site of the Front Street Shipyard. The railroad's 1946 vintage engine house was torn down and its site is now occupied by the shipyard's 26,500 ft^{2} (2,460 m^{2}), five-story boatbuilding and repair facility. In 2016 the city opened a rail trail on a 2.3-mile (3.7 km) portion of the railroad right-of-way.

Shoe manufacture became an important business. After World War II, however, the Belfast economy was driven by its poultry industry, including two of the state's larger processors, Maplewood and Penobscot Poultry. Waldo County farms supplied the factories with up to 200,000 birds a day. The annual Broiler Festival became a popular summer event, attracting both local people and tourists. But the poultry business collapsed in the mid-1970s during a national recession, devastating the city and surrounding towns. In the early 1980s, the defunct chicken-feed silos at the foot of Main Street, that once fed millions of chickens, were demolished. There was an exodus of people seeking employment prospects elsewhere through the 1960s, 1970s and 1980s. But as they left, people attracted to the natural beauty of the coast of Maine, inexpensive land and homes, some who came to go "back to the land", artists and young college graduates moved in starting a renaissance.

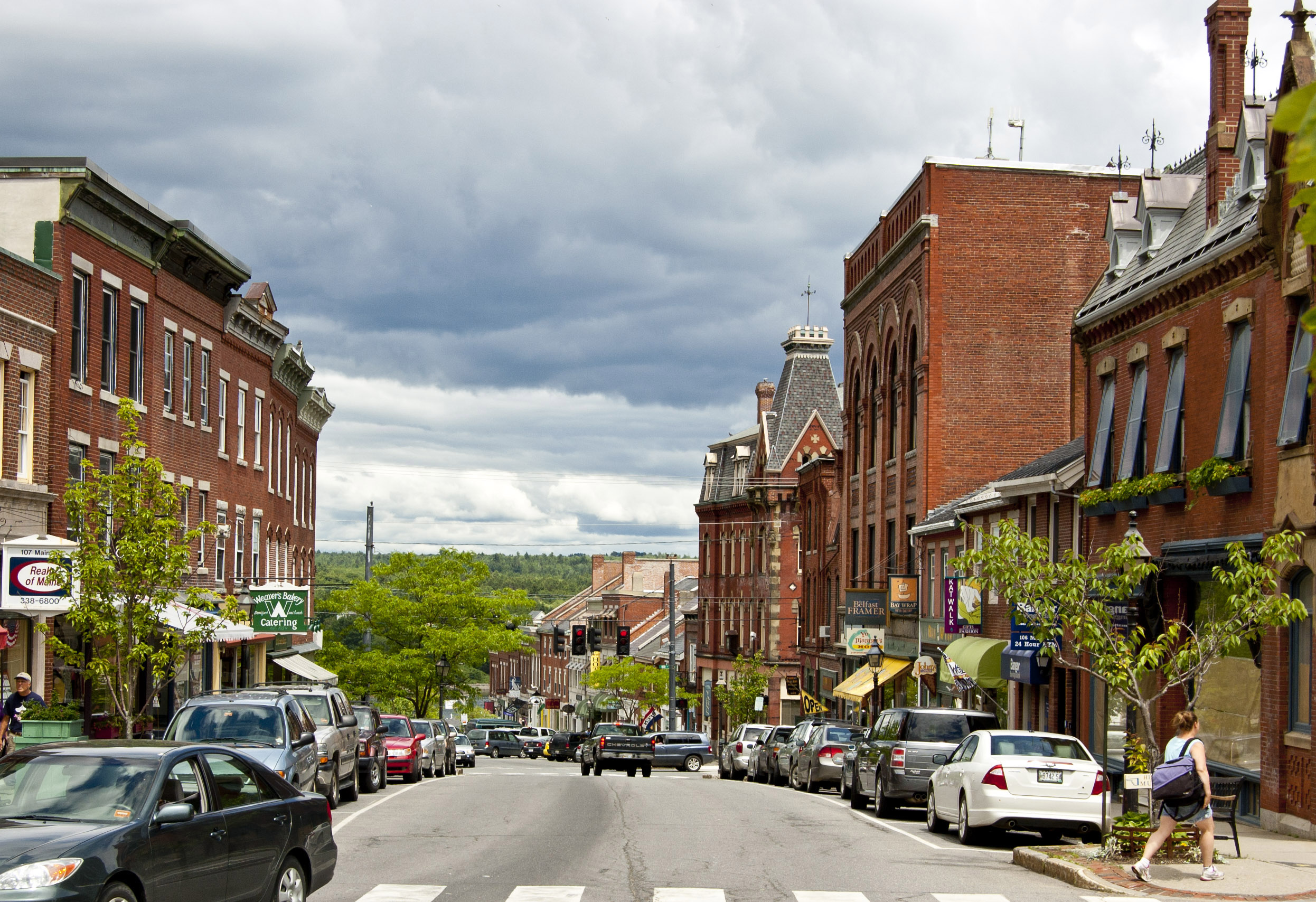
Main Street

In the early 1990s, credit card giant MBNA established two facilities in Belfast, one considerably larger than the other. The company was instrumental in establishing the Hutchinson Center of the University of Maine, an outpost of the University of Maine System, less than a mile from the main MBNA campus. Jobs provided by MBNA, which was acquired by the Bank of America, helped increase Belfast's population significantly. Bank of America consolidated former MBNA operations in the larger of the two facilities. The smaller complex was eventually taken over by athenahealth.

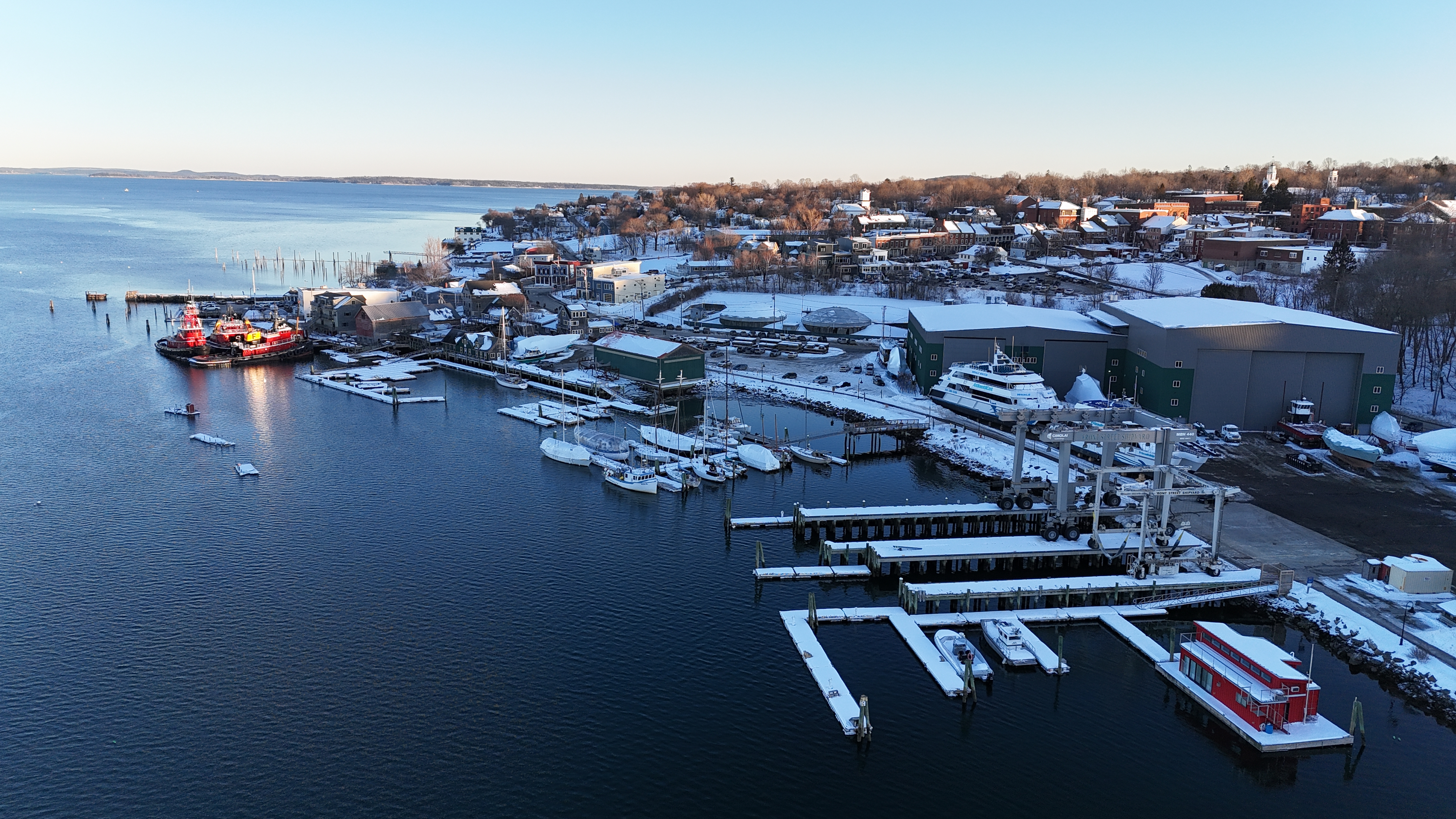
Front Street Shipyard, Belfast Maine, February 2025

In 1996, shipbuilding was re-established on the Belfast waterfront with the opening of French & Webb, Inc., classic wooden yacht builders and restorers. Following in their footsteps, Front Street Shipyard opened a major boatyard on the Belfast Bay in 2013. Together, the two boatbuilding companies have restored Belfast's working waterfront and helped revive the city economy as well as appeal to tourists. Movies filmed in Belfast include Peyton Place (1957), Thinner (1996) and In the Bedroom (2001) and the Frederick Wiseman documentary Belfast, Maine (1999) about everyday life in the city.

== Geography ==
According to the United States Census Bureau, the city has a total area of 38.37 square miles (99.38 km^{2}), of which 34.04 square miles (88.16 km^{2}) is land and 4.33 square miles (11.21 km^{2}) is water. Situated on Belfast Bay and Penobscot Bay, Belfast is drained by the Passagassawakeag River. Other smaller rivers include Goose River and Little River.

Belfast is bordered by Waldo and Swanville to the north, Searsport to the east, Northport to the south, Belmont to the southwest and Morrill to the west. It is served by US Route 1, Maine State Routes SR 3, SR 7, SR 52. SR 137 and SR 141.

=== Climate ===
This climatic region is typified by large seasonal temperature differences, with hot and humid summers and cold and dry winters. According to the Köppen Climate Classification system, Belfast has a humid continental climate, abbreviated "Dfb" on climate maps.

Climate data for Belfast, Maine (1991–2020 normals, extremes 1901–present)
Month	Jan	Feb	Mar	Apr	May	Jun	Jul	Aug	Sep	Oct	Nov	Dec	Year
Record high °F (°C)	59 (15)	65 (18)	82 (28)	85 (29)	95 (35)	96 (36)	98 (37)	98 (37)	98 (37)	87 (31)	73 (23)	65 (18)	98 (37)
Mean maximum °F (°C)	50.0 (10.0)	49.2 (9.6)	57.8 (14.3)	70.4 (21.3)	82.0 (27.8)	86.7 (30.4)	88.6 (31.4)	87.4 (30.8)	83.3 (28.5)	72.5 (22.5)	62.7 (17.1)	53.9 (12.2)	91.4 (33.0)
Mean daily maximum °F (°C)	29.5 (−1.4)	32.2 (0.1)	39.7 (4.3)	51.5 (10.8)	62.9 (17.2)	71.5 (21.9)	77.0 (25.0)	76.4 (24.7)	69.5 (20.8)	57.4 (14.1)	45.6 (7.6)	34.9 (1.6)	54.0 (12.2)
Daily mean °F (°C)	19.8 (−6.8)	21.9 (−5.6)	30.1 (−1.1)	41.3 (5.2)	52.1 (11.2)	61.0 (16.1)	68.8 (20.4)	66.0 (18.9)	58.8 (14.9)	47.7 (8.7)	37.2 (2.9)	26.6 (−3.0)	44.1 (6.7)
Mean daily minimum °F (°C)	10.2 (−12.1)	11.7 (−11.3)	20.4 (−6.4)	31.1 (−0.5)	41.3 (5.2)	50.5 (10.3)	56.6 (13.7)	55.5 (13.1)	48.1 (8.9)	37.9 (3.3)	28.8 (−1.8)	18.4 (−7.6)	34.2 (1.2)
Mean minimum °F (°C)	−10.6 (−23.7)	−8.0 (−22.2)	0.8 (−17.3)	21.8 (−5.7)	30.6 (−0.8)	40.9 (4.9)	48.9 (9.4)	46.3 (7.9)	35.0 (1.7)	25.9 (−3.4)	14.6 (−9.7)	−0.3 (−17.9)	−14.1 (−25.6)
Record low °F (°C)	−28 (−33)	−28 (−33)	−18 (−28)	10 (−12)	22 (−6)	33 (1)	43 (6)	35 (2)	24 (−4)	17 (−8)	2 (−17)	−27 (−33)	−28 (−33)
Average precipitation inches (mm)	3.94 (100)	3.16 (80)	4.12 (105)	4.38 (111)	3.86 (98)	4.28 (109)	3.17 (81)	3.06 (78)	4.09 (104)	5.38 (137)	4.69 (119)	4.65 (118)	48.78 (1,239)
Average snowfall inches (cm)	19.2 (49)	22.4 (57)	11.7 (30)	2.2 (5.6)	0.0 (0.0)	0.0 (0.0)	0.0 (0.0)	0.0 (0.0)	0.0 (0.0)	0.3 (0.76)	2.5 (6.4)	13.2 (34)	71.5 (182)
Average precipitation days (≥ 0.01 in)	9.6	8.3	7.9	10.5	11.5	10.6	10.1	8.5	7.7	10.7	10.1	11.2	116.7
Average snowy days (≥ 0.1 in)	6.2	6.1	3.0	0.9	0.0	0.0	0.0	0.0	0.0	0.1	1.1	5.0	22.4
Source: NOAA

== Demographics ==
Historical population
Census	Pop.	Note	%±
1790	245		—
1800	674		175.1%
1810	1,274		89.0%
1820	2,026		59.0%
1830	3,077		51.9%
1840	4,186		36.0%
1850	5,051		20.7%
1860	5,520		9.3%
1870	5,278		−4.4%
1880	5,308		0.6%
1890	5,294		−0.3%
1900	4,615		−12.8%
1910	4,618		0.1%
1920	5,083		10.1%
1930	4,993		−1.8%
1940	5,540		11.0%
1950	5,960		7.6%
1960	6,140		3.0%
1970	5,957		−3.0%
1980	6,243		4.8%
1990	6,355		1.8%
2000	6,381		0.4%
2010	6,668		4.5%
2020	6,938		4.0%
U.S. Decennial Census

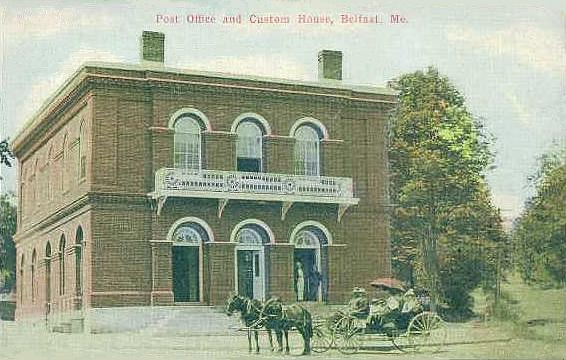
U. S. Custom House c. 1910, designed by Ammi B. Young

=== 2020 census ===
As of the 2020 census, Belfast had a population of 6,938. The median age was 52.1 years. 16.8% of residents were under the age of 18 and 31.6% of residents were 65 years of age or older. For every 100 females there were 85.5 males, and for every 100 females age 18 and over there were 83.3 males age 18 and over.

51.2% of residents lived in urban areas, while 48.8% lived in rural areas.

There were 3,241 households in Belfast, of which 19.4% had children under the age of 18 living in them. Of all households, 39.6% were married-couple households, 18.8% were households with a male householder and no spouse or partner present, and 33.7% were households with a female householder and no spouse or partner present. About 37.5% of all households were made up of individuals and 20.9% had someone living alone who was 65 years of age or older.

There were 3,750 housing units, of which 13.6% were vacant. The homeowner vacancy rate was 1.2% and the rental vacancy rate was 8.7%.

Racial composition as of the 2020 census
Race	Number	Percent
White	6,481	93.4%
Black or African American	32	0.5%
American Indian and Alaska Native	20	0.3%
Asian	56	0.8%
Native Hawaiian and Other Pacific Islander	0	0.0%
Some other race	42	0.6%
Two or more races	307	4.4%
Hispanic or Latino (of any race)	91	1.3%

=== 2010 census ===
As of the census of 2010, there were 6,668 people, 3,049 households, and 1,729 families residing in the city. The population density was 195.9 inhabitants per square mile (75.6/km^{2}). There were 3,582 housing units at an average density of 105.2 per square mile (40.6/km^{2}). The racial makeup of the city was 96.7% White, 0.5% African American, 0.4% Native American, 0.4% Asian, 0.2% from other races, and 1.8% from two or more races. Hispanic or Latino of any race were 1.2% of the population.

There were 3,049 households, of which 24.1% had children under the age of 18 living with them, 41.4% were married couples living together, 11.5% had a female householder with no spouse present, 3.8% had a male householder with no spouse present, and 43.3% were non-families. 35.9% of all households were made up of individuals, and 17.8% had someone living alone who was 65 years of age or older. The average household size was 2.14 and the average family size was 2.73.

The median age in the city was 46.9 years. 19.9% of residents were under the age of 18; 6.1% were between the ages of 18 and 24; 21.4% were from 25 to 44; 30.6% were from 45 to 64; and 21.9% were 65 years of age or older. The city's population was 46.2% male and 53.8% female.

=== 2000 census ===
As of the census of 2000, there were 6,381 people, 2,765 households, and 1,692 families residing in the city. The population density was 187.5 inhabitants per square mile (72.4/km^{2}). There were 3,121 housing units at an average density of 91.7 per square mile (35.4/km^{2}). The racial makeup of the city was 97.56% White, 0.28% African American, 0.27% Native American, 0.28% Asian, 0.02% Pacific Islander, 0.27% from other races, and 1.33% from two or more races. Hispanic or Latino of any race were 0.69% of the population.

There were 2,765 households, out of which 25.8% had children under the age of 18 living with them, 46.8% were married couples living together, 10.8% had a female householder with no spouse present, and 38.8% were non-families. 31.5% of all households were made up of individuals, and 13.3% had someone living alone who was 65 years of age or older. The average household size was 2.23 and the average family size was 2.77.

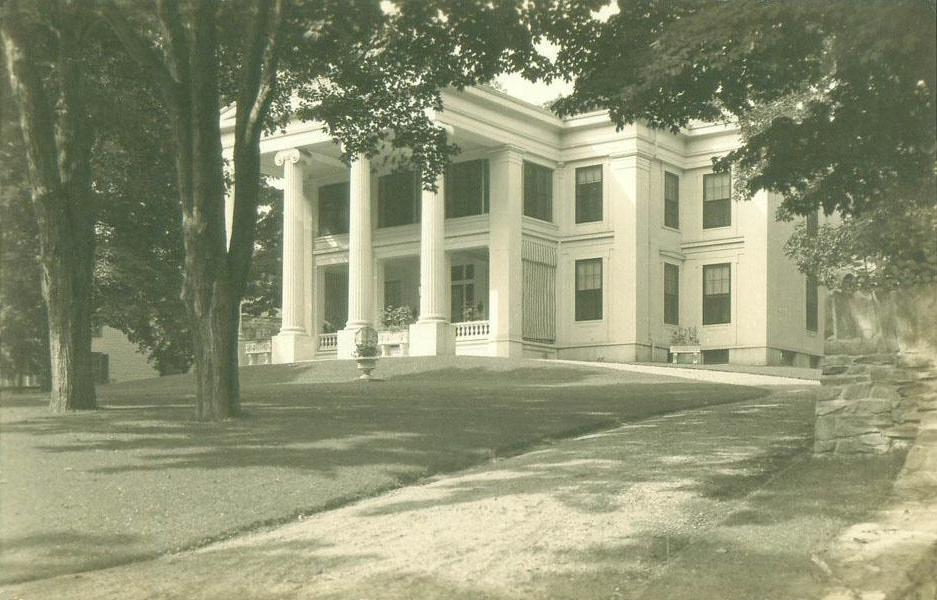
Greek Revival mansion from the shipbuilding era; postcard c. 1920

In the city, the population was spread out, with 20.9% under the age of 18, 7.5% from 18 to 24, 24.2% from 25 to 44, 27.3% from 45 to 64, and 20.0% who were 65 years of age or older. The median age was 43 years. For every 100 females, there were 87.4 males. For every 100 females age 18 and over, there were 83.0 males.

The median income for a household in the city was $32,400, and the median income for a family was $43,253. Males had a median income of $30,514 versus $27,518 for females. The per capita income for the city was $19,276. About 10.0% of families and 13.2% of the population were below the poverty line, including 19.5% of those under age 18 and 9.1% of those age 65 or over.

=== Voter registration ===
Voter Registration and Party Enrollment as of November 2014
Party	Total Voters	Percentage
Democratic	1,766	35.32%
Unenrolled	1,765	35.30%
Republican	1,262	25.24%
Green Independent	206	4.12%
Total	4,999	100%

== Education ==
The school district is Regional School Unit 71.

Mascot – Belfast Lions

Colors – Royal Blue, and Gold

These three public elementary schools closed down in early 2000s (decade):

- Pierce School – Grades K–3 (Brief use as a private school)
- Anderson School – Grades K–3 (Now Waterfall Arts)
- Robertson School – Grades 3–5 (Not in use)

Schools Part of Belfast's MSAD #34 District as of 2009:

- Captain Albert Stevens Elementary School – Grades K–5 Consolidation of Pierce, Anderson and Robertson Schools (Located in Belfast)
- Ames School – Grades 3–5 (Located in Searsmont)
- Weymouth School – Grades K–2 (Located in Morrill)
- Drinkwater School – Grades K–5 (Located in Northport)
- Nickerson School – Grades K–5 (Located in Swanville)
- East Belfast School – Grades K–5 (Located in East Belfast, nicknamed "East Side School")
- Troy A. Howard Middle School – Grades 6–8(Located in Belfast)
- Belfast Area High School – Grades 9–12 (Located in Belfast)

Towns in Regional School Unit #71 as of winter 2020:

- Belfast
- Belmont
- Swanville
- Searsmont
- Morrill

In order to save money, many schools in the state of Maine were forced to combine with other districts. Due to consolidation, MSAD #34 (Belfast) combined with MSAD #56 (Searsport) in the fall of 2009. The MSAD's no longer existed; they became one regional school unit, RSU #20. The RSU Superintendent was former Troy A. Howard Middle School and Belfast Area High School Vice Principal Bruce Mailloux. The former MSAD #56 towns of Searsport, Frankfort, and Stockton also became part of RSU #20.

Towns in the new RSU #20 District as of fall 2009 that were combined with MSAD #56:

- Belfast
- Belmont
- Swanville
- Searsmont
- Northport
- Morrill
- Searsport
- Frankfort
- Stockton Springs

Disagreements over inflating costs and the lack of local control over their students education caused several towns across Maine to consider withdrawing from these larger consolidated districts. One of these towns included Stockton Springs, which voted on March 25, 2014, to withdraw from RSU #20. At that time all eight municipalities within RSU #20 were at various points in the withdrawal process. These communities included Belfast, Searsmont, Stockton Springs, Belmont, Morrill, Northport, Searsmont and Swanville. Belfast voted in February 2014 to spend $25,000 to put together a report on the educational and financial impacts of leaving RSU 20. Although consolidation was originally done to save money and increase the educational value of students from smaller towns, the consolidation was not widely perceived to be beneficial. Belfast, Belmont, Swanville, Searsmont, and Morrill withdrew from RSU #20 and established RSU #71.

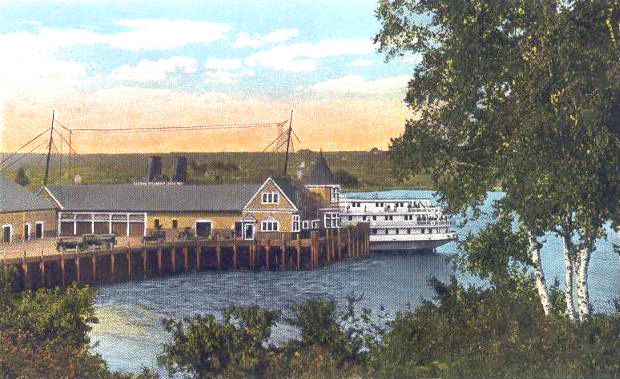
Steamboat landing in 1920

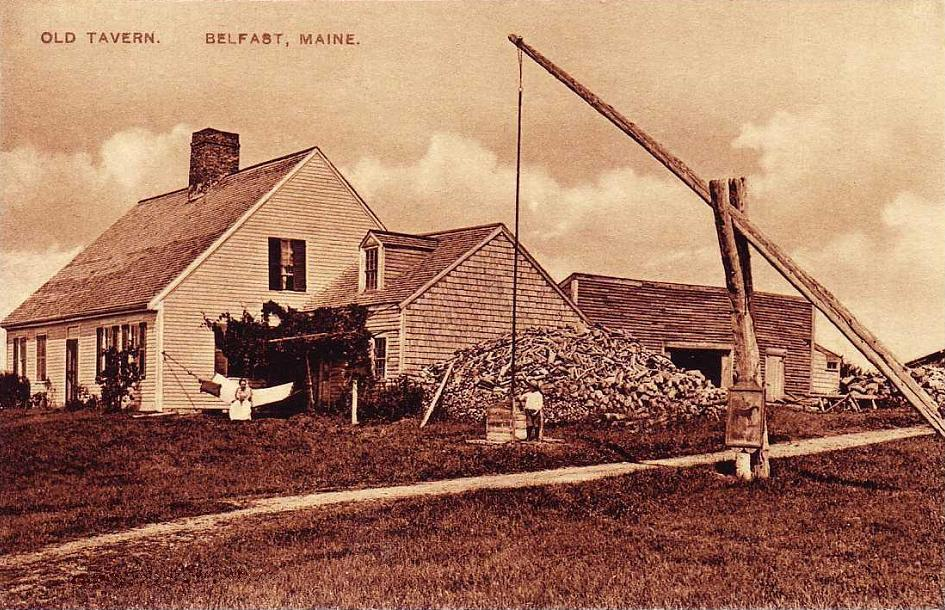
Old tavern c. 1910

== Sites of interest ==
- Belfast Historical Society and Museum
- Belfast Free Library, a public library established in 1887
- Front Street Shipyard
- Perry's Nut House

=== Belfast City Park ===
Belfast City Park is an urban park located on 17.5 acres (7.1 ha) of land overlooking Penobscot Bay. It is heavily used during the spring, summer and fall months and closed during the winter. When it was founded in 1904 by the Belfast Village Improvement Society, a local women's group, it was considered the group's biggest accomplishment.

== Notable people ==
- Nehemiah Abbott, U.S. Congressman and mayor
- Hugh J. Anderson, U.S. Congressman and 20th governor of Maine
- Hannah Pingree, Governor-elect of Maine.
- Charles G. Bryant, architect, soldier and adventurer
- Hodgdon C. Buzzell, State Senate President, probate judge and mayor
- Dorothy Cannell, novelist, mysteries writer
- William G. Crosby, poet and 23rd governor of Maine
- Donald DePoy, fifth-generation bluegrass musician and music educator.
- Essie P. Carle, women's suffragist
- Herbert L. Foss, Medal of Honor recipient (Navy), Spanish–American War
- Jonathan Frakes, actor (former resident)
- Genie Francis, actress (former resident)
- Linden Frederick, painter
- Harriet L. Hartley, public health doctor and medical school professor (20c resident)
- Harrison M. Hayford, scholar of American literature, top authority on Herman Melville
- Erin Herbig, Maine house majority leader
- Albert G. Jewett, diplomat; U.S. Chargé d'Affaires in Peru, 1845–1847; later Mayor of Belfast
- Angelina J. Knox (1819–1896; née Angelina J. Berry) inventor and abolitionist
- Clara Savage Littledale (1891–1956), journalist, first editor of Parents magazine, born in Belfast
- Hugh Dean McLellan, federal judge
- Seth L. Milliken, U.S. Congressman
- Bern Porter, scientist, artist, writer
- William Veazie Pratt, admiral; Chief of Naval Operations (Navy's highest rank)
- Phineas Quimby, mesmerist
- Nathan Read, inventor, educator, steam-power trailblazer, Congressman, judge
- Dudley Allen Sargent, Harvard professor, physical fitness pioneer
- Robert P. Skinner (1866–1960), diplomat, U.S. Ambassador to Greece, the Baltic States, Turkey
- Joseph B. Smith, Naval officer
- Albert William Stevens, Army officer, balloonist, photographer; took first photos of Earth's curvature
- Live Oak Taylor, (George Edward Taylor), professional baseball player
- Edward Wilson Very, naval officer, inventor of the Very signal flare gun
- Neil Welliver (1929–2005) visual artist, died in Belfast
- James Clarke White (1833–1916), dermatologist, "Father of American Dermatology"
- William H. Wilder, U.S. Congressman, expert on world monetary policies
- Joseph Williamson, State Senate President
- John Wilson, U.S. Congressman
- Wendall Woodbury, television journalist and anchor
