= Goose River (Belfast Bay) =

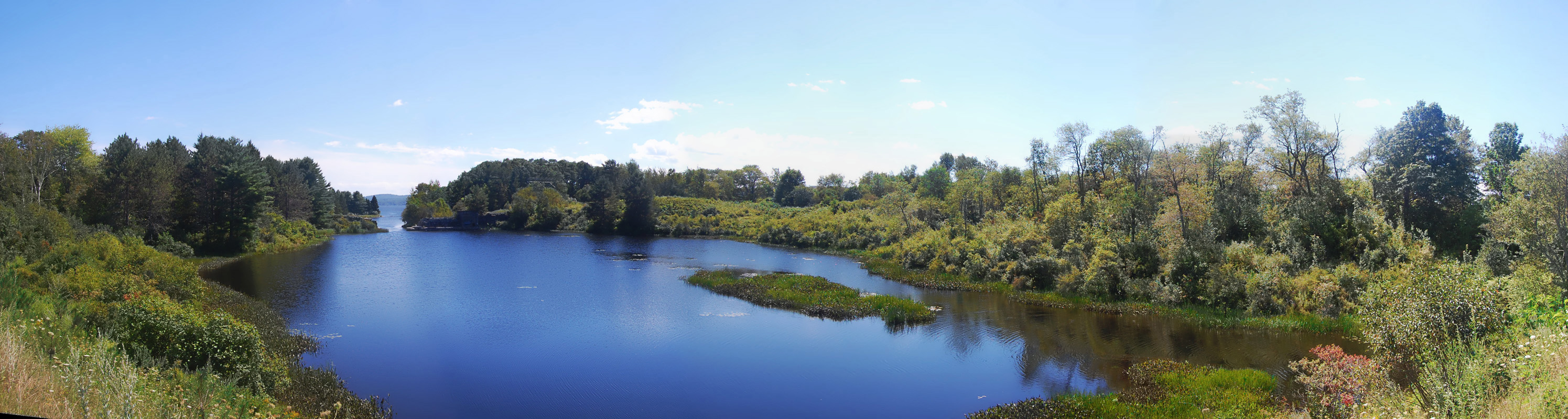

- Location of the mouth of the Goose River in Maine

Location
- Country: United States
- State: Maine
- County: Waldo

Physical characteristics
- Source: Swan Lake
  - coordinates: 44°31′20″N 68°59′51″W
  - elevation: 200 feet (61 m)
- Mouth: Belfast Bay
  - coordinates: 44°25′47″N 68°59′34″W
  - elevation: 0 ft
- Length: 9 miles (14 km)

The Goose River is a river in Waldo County, Maine. From the outflow of Swan Lake in Swanville, the river runs 9.3 miles (15.0 km) south to the city of Belfast and its mouth at Belfast Bay, an arm of Penobscot Bay.

== See also ==
- List of rivers of Maine

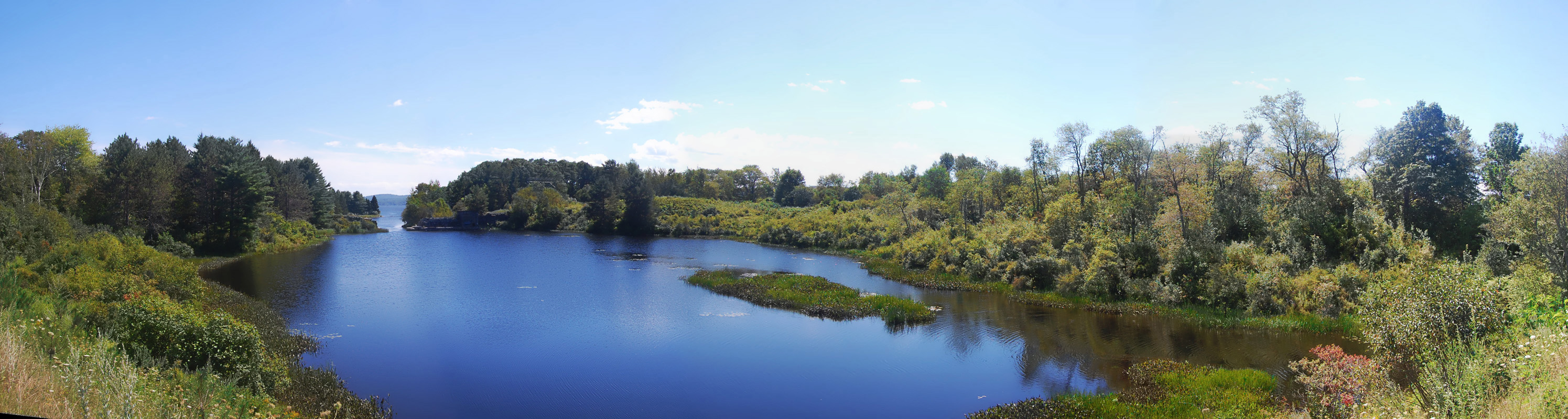
Panorama of the mouth of Goose River as it empties into Belfast Bay, Belfast, ME
