= Morrill, Maine =

Town in Maine, United States

- Town
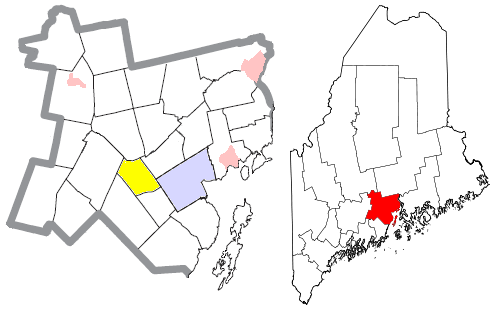
- Location of Morrill (in yellow) in Waldo County and the state of Maine
- Coordinates: 44°25′42″N 69°08′30″W
- Country: United States
- State: Maine
- County: Waldo

Area
  - Total: 17.05 sq mi (44.16 km^{2})
  - Land: 16.56 sq mi (42.89 km^{2})
  - Water: 0.49 sq mi (1.27 km^{2})
- Elevation: 223 ft (68 m)

Population (2020)
  - Total: 971
  - Density: 59/sq mi (22.6/km^{2})
- Time zone: UTC-5 (Eastern (EST))
  - Summer (DST): UTC-4 (EDT)
- ZIP code: 04952
- Area code: 207
- FIPS code: 23-47245
- GNIS feature ID: 582608
- Website: www.morrillme.org

Morrill is a town in Waldo County, Maine, United States. The population was 971 at the 2020 census.

== History ==
Morrill is situated in the central part of Waldo County, 6½ miles west of Belfast. The surface of the town is uneven, but with very little waste land. Morey and Rowe hills are probably the highest elevations, though these have no great altitude. The soil is sandy in parts, and in others clay loam. Hay and potatoes are the chief crops. The usual forest trees of the region thrive here. Cross Pond, in this town, contains about 100 acres (40 ha), and another—Dolliff—about 50 acres (200,000 m^{2}). The chief water-power is at the village on the east on the Passagassawakeag Stream. There are here shingle and stave mills, and a horse-rake factory. Morrill is on the Belfast and Kendall’s Mills stage-line. The nearest railroad station is at Belfast.

Morrill was incorporated March 3, 1855; being named in honor of Hon. Anson P. Morrill, then governor of the State. The first settlements were made by James Weymouth, Benjamin Smith, Joseph Corning and Nathaniel Cushman, in 1801 and 1802. They purchased their lands of General Henry Knox, proprietor under the Waldo Patent.

The Grange has a good building here, which is used as a townhall. There is a Methodist society in the town, and a Union meetinghouse at the village. The town has five public schoolhouses. The valuation of estates in 1870 was $133,099. In 1880 it was $122,098. The rate of taxation in the latter was for money tax, 42 mills on the dollar. The population in 1870 was 523. In 1880 it was 494.

== Geography ==
According to the United States Census Bureau, the town has a total area of 17.05 square miles (44.16 km^{2}), of which 16.56 square miles (42.89 km^{2}) is land and 0.49 square miles (1.27 km^{2}) is water. Principal bodies of water include Smiths Mill Pond (81 acres) and Cross Pond (159 acres). It is bounded on the north by Knox, to the east by Waldo and Belfast, south by Belmont, and west by Searsmont and Montville.

== Demographics ==
Historical population
| Census | Pop. | Note | %± |
|---|---|---|---|
| 1860 | 629 | | — |
| 1870 | 523 | | −16.9% |
| 1880 | 494 | | −5.5% |
| 1890 | 460 | | −6.9% |
| 1900 | 420 | | −8.7% |
| 1910 | 353 | | −16.0% |
| 1920 | 307 | | −13.0% |
| 1930 | 288 | | −6.2% |
| 1940 | 328 | | 13.9% |
| 1950 | 306 | | −6.7% |
| 1960 | 355 | | 16.0% |
| 1970 | 410 | | 15.5% |
| 1980 | 506 | | 23.4% |
| 1990 | 644 | | 27.3% |
| 2000 | 774 | | 20.2% |
| 2010 | 884 | | 14.2% |
| 2020 | 971 | | 9.8% |
U.S. Decennial Census

=== 2010 census ===
As of the census of 2010, there were 884 people, 337 households, and 242 families residing in the town. The population density was 53.4 inhabitants per square mile (20.6/km^{2}). There were 379 housing units at an average density of 22.9 per square mile (8.8/km^{2}). The racial makeup of the town was 96.3% White, 0.2% African American, 1.1% Native American, 0.1% Asian, 0.8% from other races, and 1.5% from two or more races. Hispanic or Latino of any race were 1.8% of the population.

There were 337 households, of which 32.6% had children under the age of 18 living with them, 59.3% were married couples living together, 7.4% had a female householder with no husband present, 5.0% had a male householder with no wife present, and 28.2% were non-families. 22.8% of all households were made up of individuals, and 9.5% had someone living alone who was 65 years of age or older. The average household size was 2.62 and the average family size was 3.06.

The median age in the town was 40.9 years. 25.3% of residents were under the age of 18; 8% were between the ages of 18 and 24; 23.1% were from 25 to 44; 29.6% were from 45 to 64; and 13.9% were 65 years of age or older. The gender makeup of the town was 49.2% male and 50.8% female.

=== 2000 census ===
As of the census of 2000, there were 774 people, 299 households, and 217 families residing in the town. The population density was 46.7 inhabitants per square mile (18.0/km^{2}). There were 331 housing units at an average density of 20.0 per square mile (7.7/km^{2}). The racial makeup of the town was 97.93% White, 0.13% Native American, 0.65% Asian, and 1.29% from two or more races. Hispanic or Latino of any race were 0.39% of the population.

There were 299 households, out of which 35.5% had children under the age of 18 living with them, 61.9% were married couples living together, 9.4% had a female householder with no husband present, and 27.4% were non-families. 20.7% of all households were made up of individuals, and 8.4% had someone living alone who was 65 years of age or older. The average household size was 2.59 and the average family size was 3.00.

In the town, the population was spread out, with 26.7% under the age of 18, 5.9% from 18 to 24, 30.4% from 25 to 44, 26.0% from 45 to 64, and 11.0% who were 65 years of age or older. The median age was 37 years. For every 100 females, there were 92.5 males. For every 100 females age 18 and over, there were 92.2 males.

The median income for a household in the town was $34,583, and the median income for a family was $36,250. Males had a median income of $29,750 versus $25,096 for females. The per capita income for the town was $15,596. About 13.0% of families and 13.1% of the population were below the poverty line, including 19.2% of those under age 18 and 16.7% of those age 65 or over.

== Quantabacook Lake ==
=== Recreation ===
Quantabacook Lake – Along with nearby ponds, a 15-mile (24 km) stretch of the St. George River, from Appleton to Warren, supports an assemblage of rare plants, invertebrates, and natural communities that is found nowhere else in central or coastal Maine.

=== Nature & Wildlife Sanctuary ===
A privately owned nature and wildlife sanctuary is at the head (north) of Quantabacook Lake along Route 3, this sanctuary includes a small islet, Converse Island, approximately 2 acres (8,100 m^{2}) in size, and a few rock outcroppings in Quantabacook Lake. (Location coordinates: 44.4022, −69.16799)

== Local landmarks ==
Local landmarks include Bartlett Stream Reservoir (44.4084073, −69.2211529), Converse Island (44.3999002, −69.1740011), Dolliff Pond (44.4211851, −69.1903184), Green Wood Cemetery (44.4259067, −69.2414312), Hillcrest Cemetery (44.4081297, −69.2133748), Little Pond (44.3881302, −69.1972633), Merrill Point (44.4050744, −69.1839293), Morey Hill (44.4397959, −69.1861516), Quantabacook Lake (44.3889637, −69.1772626), Quantabacook Lake Dam (44.3700751, −69.1828183), Ruffingham Meadow State Game Management Area (44.4078516, −69.2392090), Ruffingham Meadows Dam (44.4084073, −69.2211529), Sheep Island (44.3925747, −69.1803182), Thompson Brook (44.4128516, −69.2311532), Wilson Brook (44.4022966, −69.1958743), Witcher Swamp (44.3809077, −69.2417093), and Wood Island (44.4050744, −69.1836516).

== Education ==
=== Primary and secondary schools ===
Primary education is mainly covered by Weymouth Public School, covering Pre-K through Grade 1 students. The town however does not possess of a school for grades above 1, and as such is supplemented by Ames Elementary, located in the neighboring town of Searsmont, an approximate 12 minute distance from the town. Said school supplements Grade 2-5. Middle School and High School education is supported by Troy Howard Middle School and Belfast Area High School, both located in Belfast, Maine.

Weymouth Public School and the aforementioned schools all fall under Regional School Unit 71.
