= Swan Lake (Maine) =

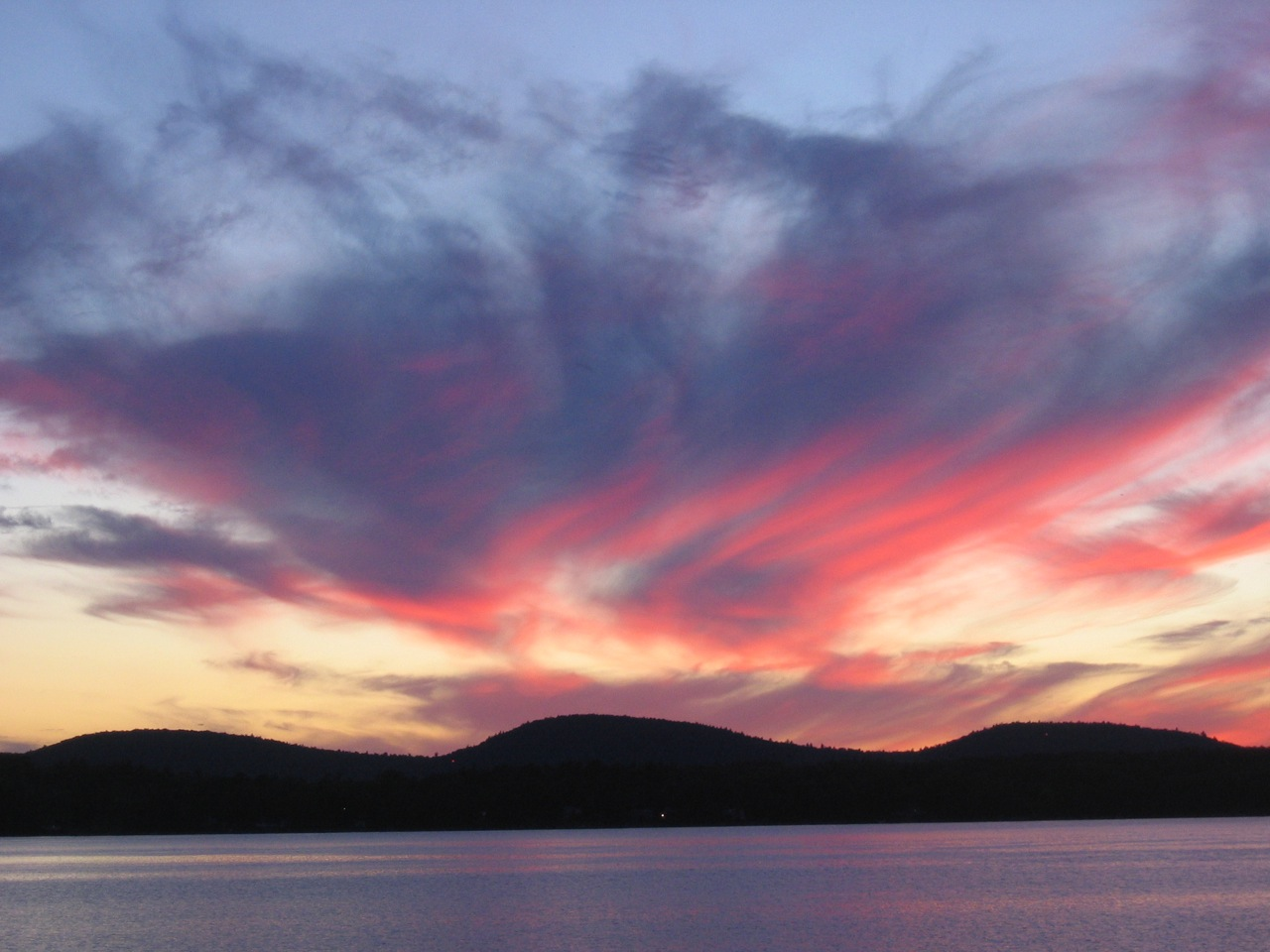

- Location within Maine Location within the United States
- Location: Waldo County, Maine
- Coordinates: 44°32′55″N 68°59′29″W
- Type: Reservoir
- Primary outflows: Goose River
- Catchment area: 8.68 sq mi (22.5 km^{2})
- Basin countries: United States
- Max. length: 3 mi (4.8 km)
- Max. width: 1 mi (1.6 km)
- Surface area: 1,370 acres (550 ha; 2.14 sq mi)
- Average depth: 34 ft (10 m)
- Max. depth: 87 ft (27 m)
- Water volume: 41,217 acre⋅ft (50,840,000 m^{3})
- Surface elevation: 200 ft (61 m)

Swan Lake is the second largest lake in Waldo County, Maine. Originally known as Goose Pond, during the 19th century it came increasingly to be referred to as Swan Lake, after the town of Swanville, Maine, which before incorporation had been known as the Plantation of Swan.

The lake is drained by Goose River, through a small dam that is owned and operated by Goose River Hydro, Inc., which also owns the water rights. In 1979 an agreement was brokered between the towns of Swanville, Frankfort, Searsport and Goose River Hydro, Inc. The agreement covers water levels as well as Goose River Hydro's responsibility for the dam and land around it.

Most of the area of the lake is in the town of Swanville, with the remainder in Searsport and Frankfort. Approximately 350 houses line the shore of the lake. Swan Lake State Park is on the north shore.

== See also ==
- List of lakes in Maine
