= Belfast Bay =

Belfast Bay may refer to:

- Mercers Creek Bay, Antigua, formerly Belfast Bay
- Belfast Bay (Maine), Belfast, Maine
