= Searsport =

Searsport may refer to a location in the United States:

- Searsport, Maine, a town
- Searsport (CDP), Maine, census-designated place comprising the center of the town
