= Lake Passagassawakeag =

Lake in Waldo County, Maine, United States

- Location within Maine Location within the United States
- Location: Waldo County, Maine
- Coordinates: 44°30′41″N 69°07′53″W
- Primary outflows: Passagassawakeag River
- Basin countries: United States
- Surface area: 117 acres (47 ha; 0.183 sq mi)
- Average depth: 22 ft (6.7 m)
- Max. depth: 40 ft (12 m)
- Surface elevation: 308 ft (94 m)

Lake Passagassawakeag (also known as Randall Pond) is a lake in Waldo County, Maine and is drained by the Passagassawakeag River.
