= Swan Lake State Park =

State park in Maine, United States

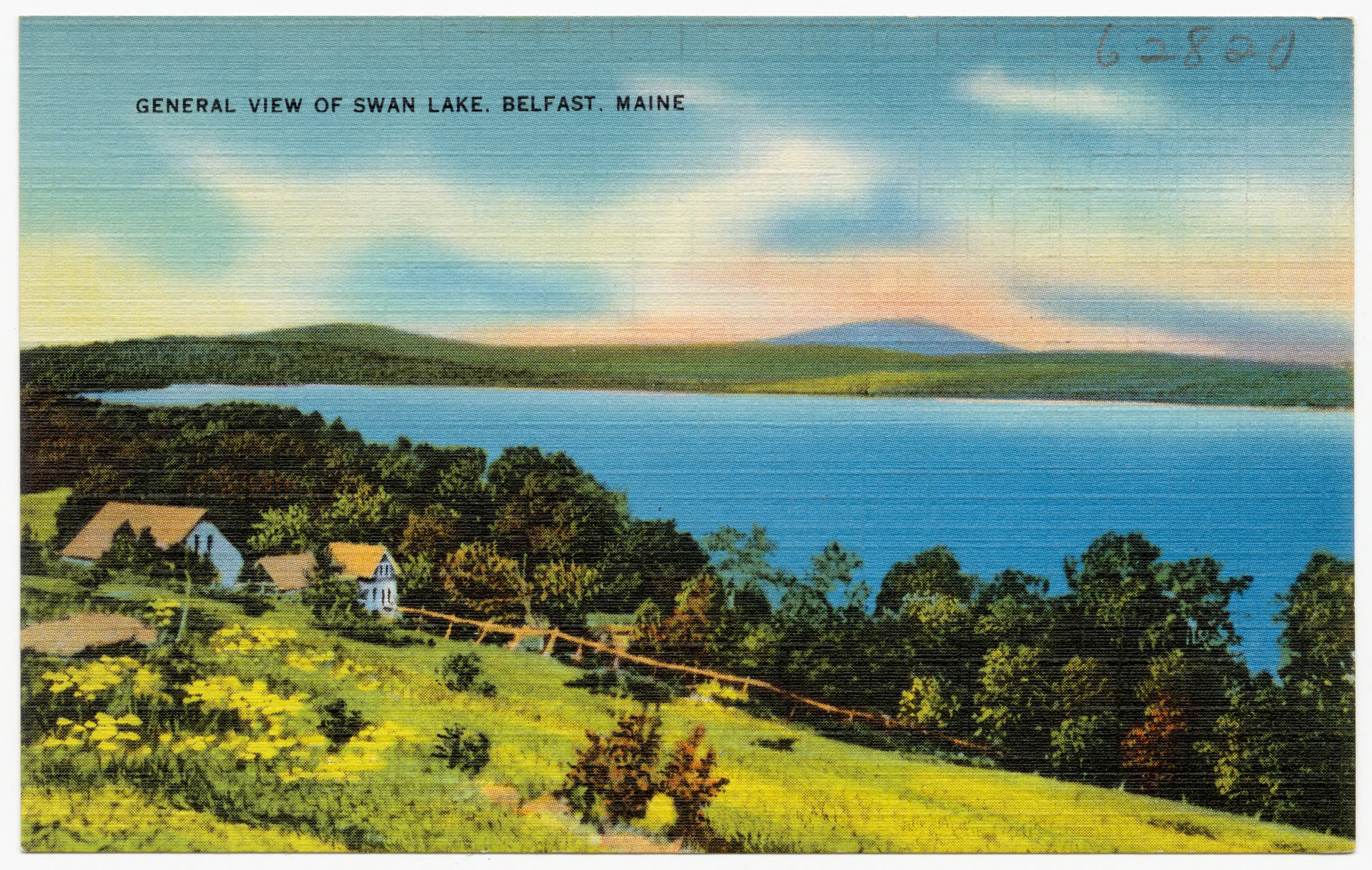
- Postcard view of Swan Lake

- Location within Maine
- Interactive map of Swan Lake State Park
- Location: Swanville, Maine, United States
- Coordinates: 44°33′50″N 68°58′44″W
- Area: 67 acres (27 ha)
- Elevation: 200 ft (61 m)
- Administrator: Maine Department of Agriculture, Conservation and Forestry
- Website: Official website
- Maine State Parks

Swan Lake State Park is a public recreation area at the north end of 3-mile-long (4.8 km) Swan Lake in the town of Swanville, Waldo County, Maine. The state park's 67 acres (27 ha) offer opportunities for swimming, picnicking, canoeing, and fishing. The 1,370-acre (550 ha) lake supports populations of smallmouth bass, landlocked salmon, white perch, brook trout, and wild togue. The park is managed by the Maine Department of Agriculture, Conservation and Forestry.
