= Waldo, Maine =

Town in Maine, United States

- Town
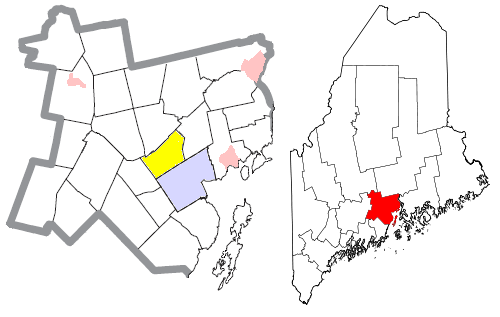
- Location of Waldo (in yellow) in Waldo County and the state of Maine
- Coordinates: 44°28′47″N 69°05′28″W
- Country: United States
- State: Maine
- County: Waldo
- Incorporated: 1845
- Named for: Samuel Waldo

Area
  - Total: 19.30 sq mi (49.99 km^{2})
  - Land: 19.29 sq mi (49.96 km^{2})
  - Water: 0.012 sq mi (0.03 km^{2})
- Elevation: 302 ft (92 m)

Population (2020)
  - Total: 795
  - Density: 41/sq mi (15.9/km^{2})
- Time zone: UTC-5 (Eastern (EST))
  - Summer (DST): UTC-4 (EDT)
- ZIP code: 04915
- Area code: 207
- FIPS code: 23-79480
- GNIS feature ID: 582785
- Website: townofwaldomaine.com

Waldo is a town in Waldo County, Maine, United States. The population was 795 at the 2020 census.

== History ==
The area was once part of the Waldo Patent, a large tract of land owned by Brigadier-General Samuel Waldo of Boston. It was first settled in 1811 by Henry Davidson, then organized as Waldo Plantation on July 6, 1821. The town was incorporated by the legislature on March 17, 1845, taking the name of its early proprietor.

A large portion of Waldo was rocky and uneven, unfit for cultivation. Some parts had arable soil, however, producing excellent farms and prosperous farmers. The town became noted for prize-winning cattle. It was also known for its forests, with much of the timber used for Belfast shipbuilding. The Wescott Stream provided water power, and by 1859 Waldo had seven busy sawmills. It also had one gristmill, some shingle machines, and a tannery. In 1870, the Belfast & Moosehead Lake Railroad began operating, its trains passing through the town.

== Geography ==
According to the United States Census Bureau, the town has a total area of 19.30 square miles (49.99 km^{2}), of which 19.29 square miles (49.96 km^{2}) is land and 0.01 square miles (0.03 km^{2}) is water. Waldo is drained by the Passagassawakeag River and Wescott Stream.

The town is served by state routes 7, 131, 137 and 203. It is bordered by Brooks on the north, Swanville on the east, Belfast on the south and Morrill on the west.

== Demographics ==
Historical population
Census	Pop.	Note	%±
1820	245		—
1830	534		118.0%
1840	721		35.0%
1850	812		12.6%
1860	728		−10.3%
1870	648		−11.0%
1880	663		2.3%
1890	581		−12.4%
1900	468		−19.4%
1910	386		−17.5%
1920	396		2.6%
1930	362		−8.6%
1940	340		−6.1%
1950	324		−4.7%
1960	395		21.9%
1970	431		9.1%
1980	495		14.8%
1990	626		26.5%
2000	733		17.1%
2010	762		4.0%
2020	795		4.3%
U.S. Decennial Census

=== 2010 census ===
As of the census of 2010, there were 762 people, 332 households, and 219 families living in the town. The population density was 39.5 inhabitants per square mile (15.3/km^{2}). There were 373 housing units at an average density of 19.3 per square mile (7.5/km^{2}). The racial makeup of the town was 96.9% White, 0.3% African American, 0.8% Native American, 0.4% Asian, 0.1% Pacific Islander, 0.1% from other races, and 1.4% from two or more races. Hispanic or Latino of any race were 0.9% of the population.

There were 332 households, of which 25.9% had children under the age of 18 living with them, 52.4% were married couples living together, 8.7% had a female householder with no husband present, 4.8% had a male householder with no wife present, and 34.0% were non-families. 27.7% of all households were made up of individuals, and 6% had someone living alone who was 65 years of age or older. The average household size was 2.30 and the average family size was 2.78.

The median age in the town was 42.9 years. 19.3% of residents were under the age of 18; 7.4% were between the ages of 18 and 24; 26.2% were from 25 to 44; 34.3% were from 45 to 64; and 12.9% were 65 years of age or older. The gender makeup of the town was 52.2% male and 47.8% female.

=== 2000 census ===
As of the census of 2000, there were 733 people, 290 households, and 207 families living in the town. The population density was 37.8 inhabitants per square mile (14.6/km^{2}). There were 313 housing units at an average density of 16.1 per square mile (6.2/km^{2}). The racial makeup of the town was 96.59% White, 0.55% African American, 0.95% Native American, 0.27% Asian, and 1.64% from two or more races. Hispanic or Latino of any race were 1.09% of the population.

There were 290 households, out of which 34.8% had children under the age of 18 living with them, 57.2% were married couples living together, 9.7% had a female householder with no husband present, and 28.6% were non-families. 21.7% of all households were made up of individuals, and 5.2% had someone living alone who was 65 years of age or older. The average household size was 2.53 and the average family size was 2.96.

In the town, the population was spread out, with 26.3% under the age of 18, 6.7% from 18 to 24, 29.9% from 25 to 44, 26.9% from 45 to 64, and 10.2% who were 65 years of age or older. The median age was 38 years. For every 100 females, there were 104.7 males. For every 100 females age 18 and over, there were 106.1 males.

The median income for a household in the town was $29,063, and the median income for a family was $38,125. Males had a median income of $25,341 versus $21,771 for females. The per capita income for the town was $14,030. About 12.4% of families and 16.8% of the population were below the poverty line, including 17.2% of those under age 18 and 18.4% of those age 65 or over.

== Notable residents ==
Heather Hemmens, who is known for her role on Hellcats.
