= Walter E. Whitcomb =

Walter E. Whitcomb is a Maine politician and farmer. A Republican, Whitcomb was a member of the Maine House of Representatives from 1984 to 1996, including stints as Assistant Minority Leader (1990 to 1994) and Minority Leader (1994 to 1996). Since January 2011, Whitcomb has served as Commissioner of the Department of Agriculture, Food and Rural Resources in Governor Paul LePage's Administration. A resident of Waldo, Maine, he owns a 400 head farm called Springdale Jerseys.

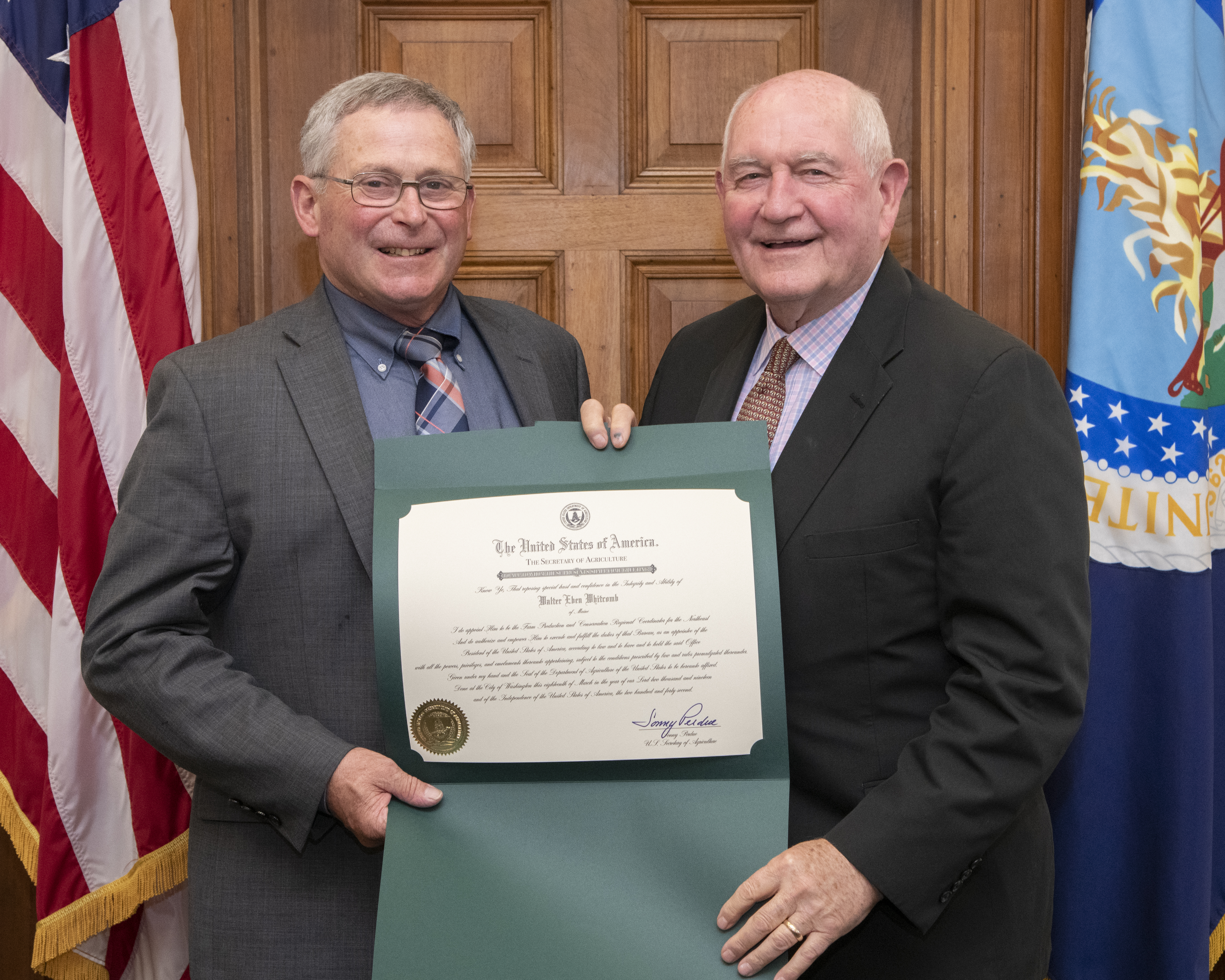
Whitcomb in 2019
