= Josephine Bicknell Neal =

1880-1955, American physician

- Born: October 10, 1880; Belmont, Maine
- Died: March 19, 1955 (aged 74); New York City
- Education: Bates College, Cornell University Medical College
- Occupation: Physician

Josephine Bicknell Neal (1880–1955) was an American physician known for her work in the field of encephalitis and infantile paralysis.

== Biography ==
Neal was born on October 10, 1880, in Belmont, Maine. She attended Bates College and Cornell University Medical College.

Neal held various positions throughout her career. She was a teacher in Maine until she earned enough money to pay for medical school. She worked as a researcher in the subject of meningitis for New York City Department of Health. She was a physician specializing in pediatric tuberculosis at the Vanderbilt Clinic (part of Columbia University Irving Medical Center). Neal served on the International Commission for the Study of Infantile Paralysis.

Neal also taught at the Columbia University College of Physicians and Surgeons, retiring in 1941. Neal was the author of books and articles including Encephalitis: A Clinical Study. In reviewing Encephalitis: A Clinical Study, Time magazine referred to the U.S.'s No. 1 encephalitis specialist, Dr. Josephine Bicknell Neal of New York City's Health Department. In 1934 she was a volunteer for a test vaccine for polio.

Neal died on March 19, 1955, in the New York Infirmary.
