= Front Street Shipyard =

Coordinates: 44.429113°N 69.009006°W

- Custom Boat Builder in Belfast, Maine
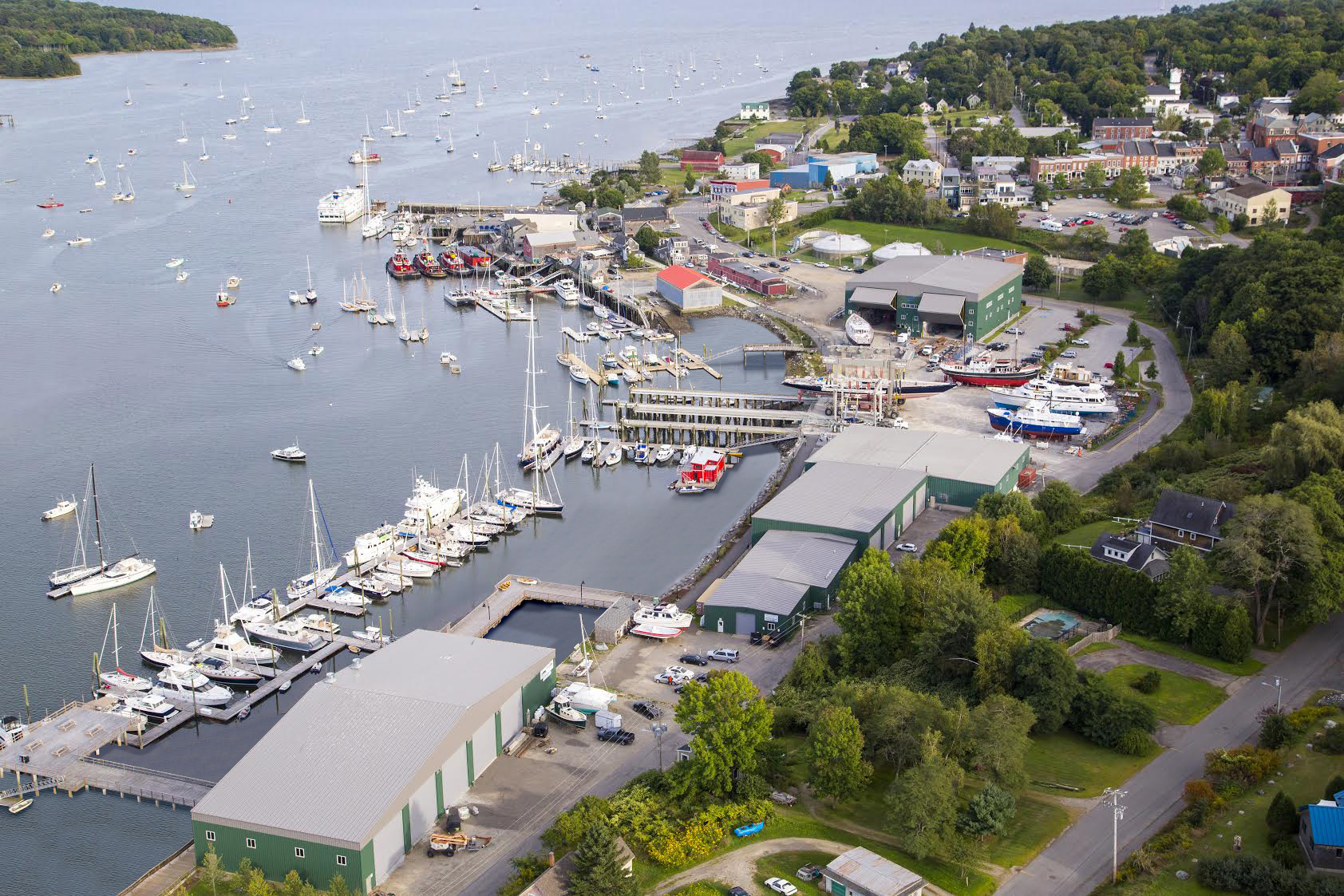
- Aerial of Front Street Shipyard in Belfast, Maine.
- Location: 101 Front Street, Belfast, Maine
- Lat/Long: 44° 25′ 46 / -69° 0′ 27″
- Industry: Yacht Construction, Yacht Refits
- Website: www.frontstreetshipyard.com

Front Street Shipyard is a custom boat builder, boat yard, marina, and service yard in Belfast, Maine, USA. The yard is located along the waterfront in Penobscot Bay. The business was established in 2011. One year later, the ownership group also purchased the neighboring business, Belfast Boat Yard. In 2014, Front Street Shipyard began leasing a building in Bucksport, Maine, where production boats are built.

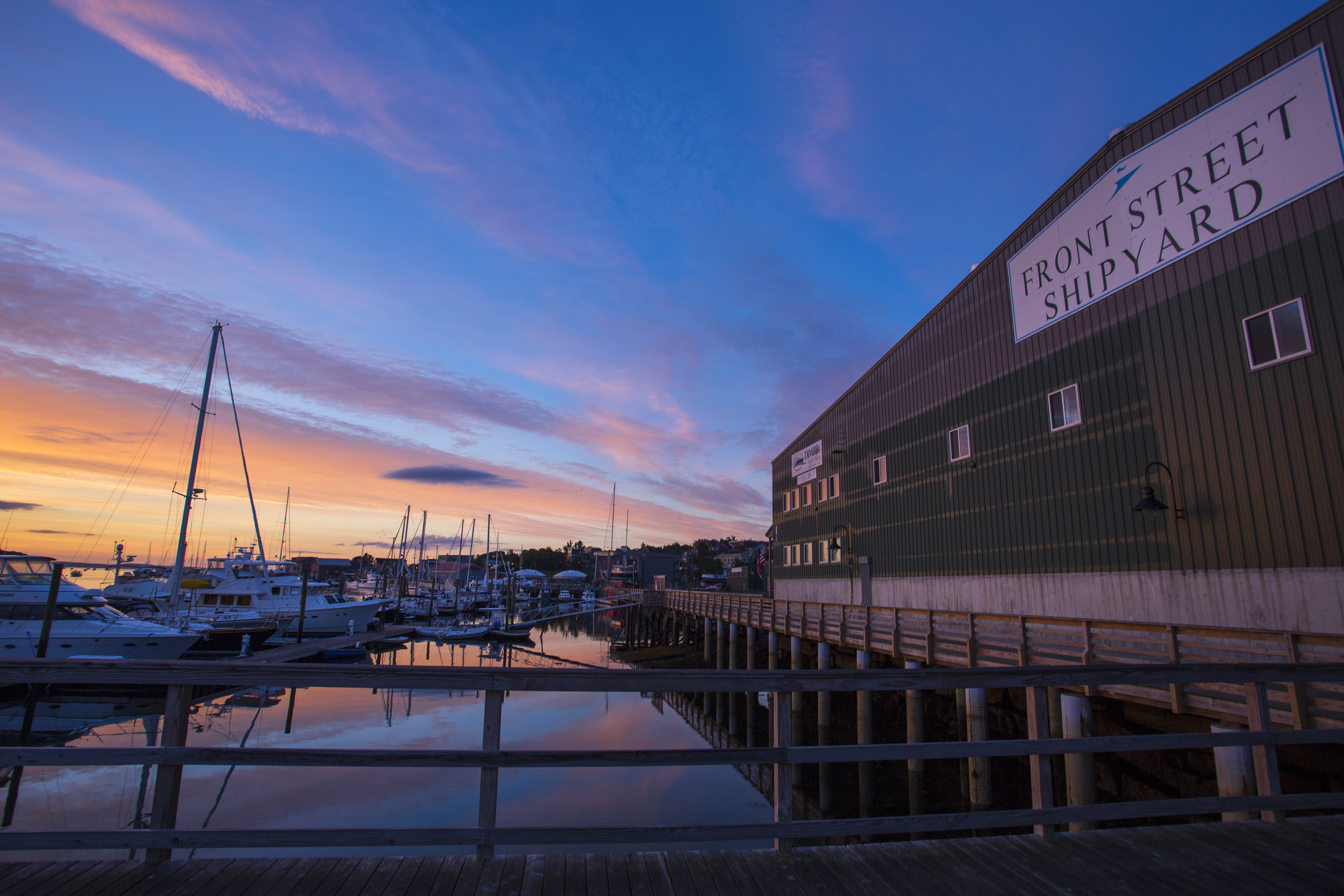
Docks at Front Street Shipyard.

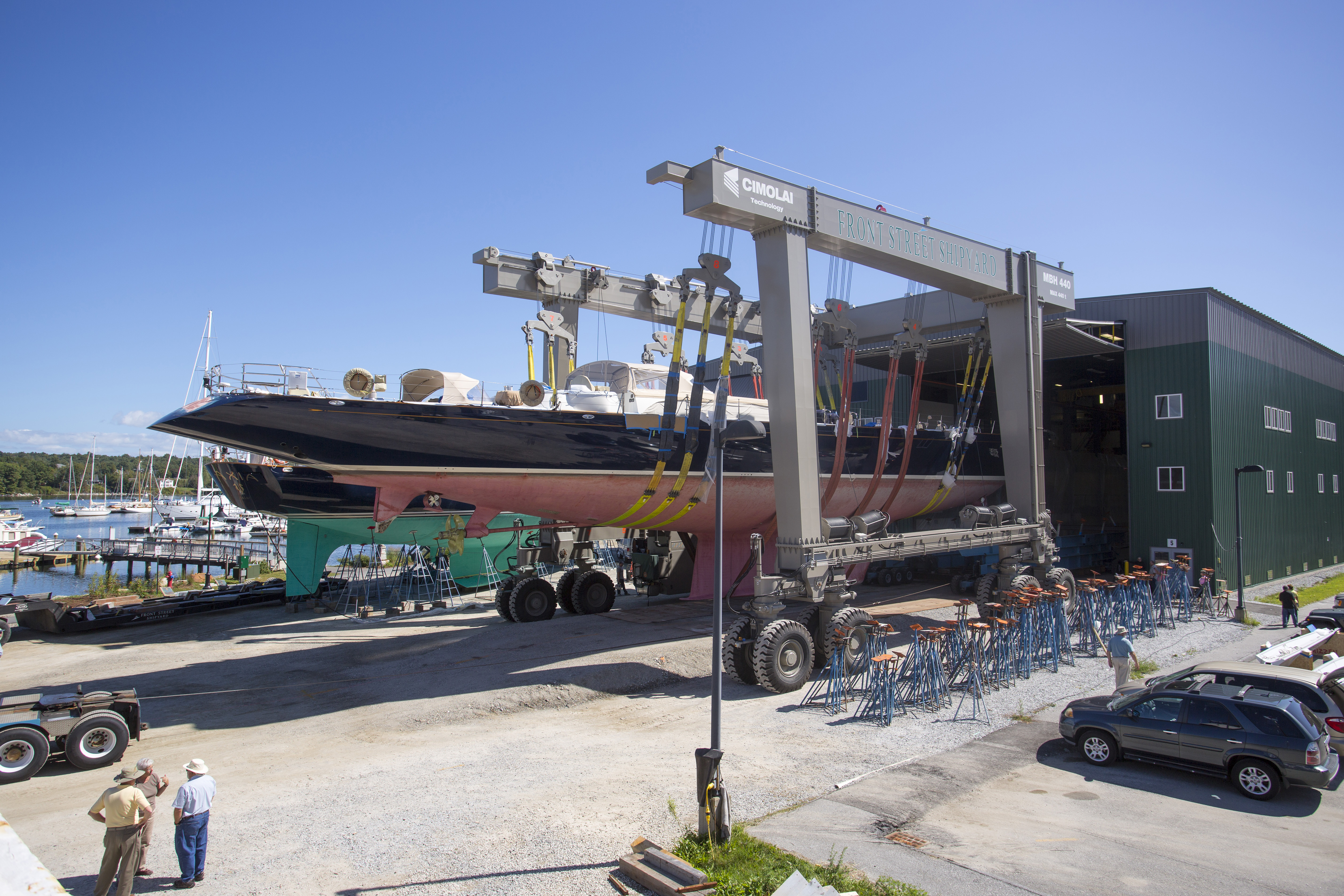
Hauling ASOLARE at Front Street Shipyard in Belfast, Maine.

Front Street Shipyard is situated on a six-acre property with 1,500 feet of waterfront. The yard has 72,555 square feet of space for yacht storage and 10,320 square feet of shop space for boat building and yacht refits. The buildings on site are long enough and tall enough to accommodate yachts up to 155 feet long. There are seven acres of off-site storage space, as well as a production boat building facility in the neighboring town of Bucksport. The yard has a yacht lifting capacity of 485 tons, making it capable of lifting superyachts.

Front Street Shipyard specializes in boat building and yacht refits. Notable superyacht refits at Front Street Shipyard include:

- ASHA, a 90-foot Palmer Johnson motoryacht, in 2015.
- ASOLARE, a 154-foot cold-molded wooden ketch, in 2014.
- MARAE, a 108-foot pilothouse sloop, in 2014.
- ATLANTIDE, a 122-foot historic steel motoryacht, in 2012–13.
- STONEFACE, a 106-foot aluminum Burger motoryacht, in 2011–12.

Front Street Shipyard works with yacht designers to develop concept yacht designs for new construction. The designs available for construction at Front Street Shipyard include:

- 84-foot and 102-foot modern sloops designed by Bill Tripp.
- 118-foot and 130-foot sloops designed by Sparkman & Stephens.

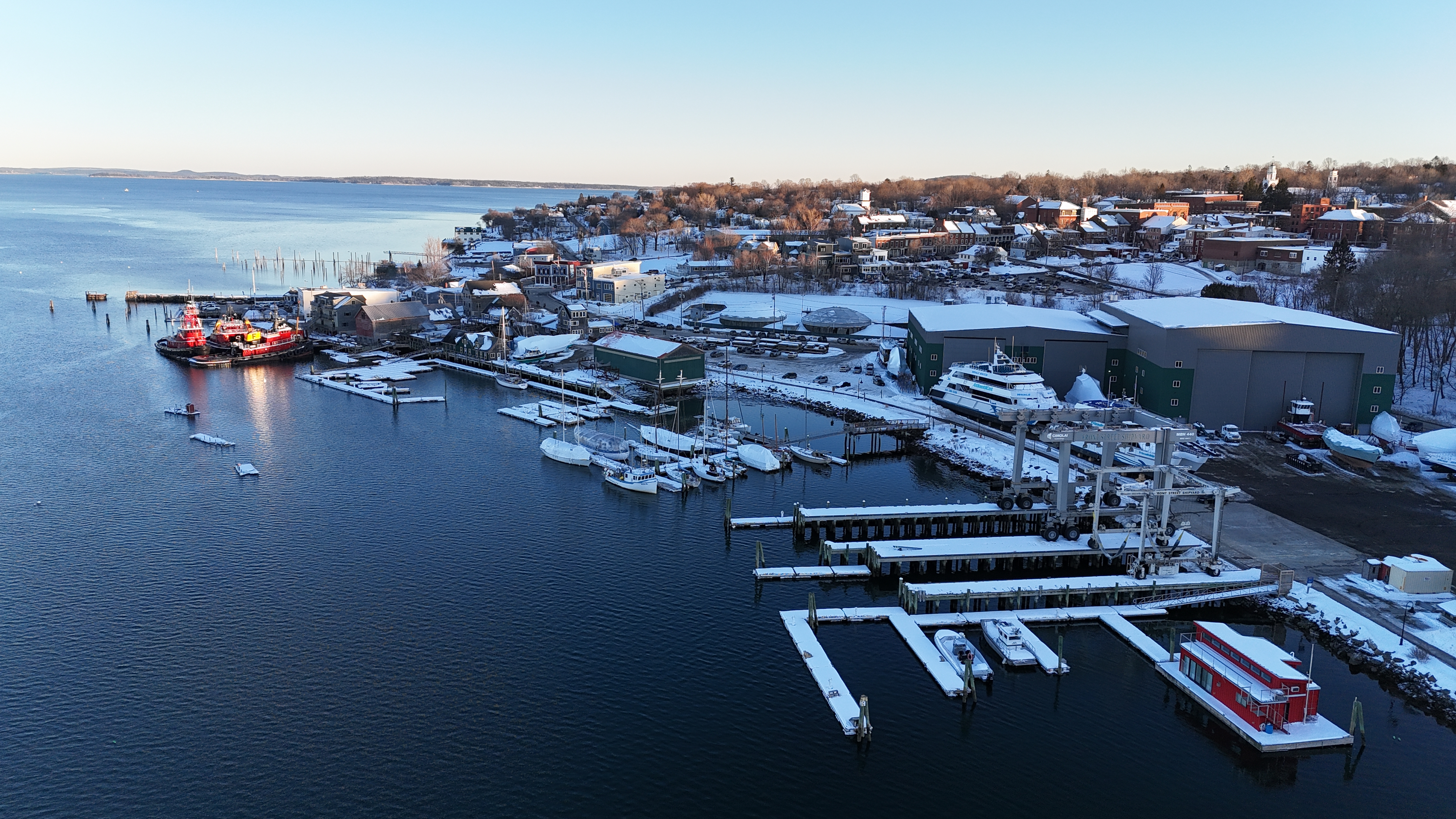
Front Street Shipyard, Belfast Maine, February 2025
