= East Thorndike, Maine =

- Unincorporated village
- Location within Maine Location within the United States
- Coordinates: 44°35′30″N 69°12′04″W
- Country: United States
- State: Maine
- County: Waldo
- Elevation: 532 ft (162 m)
- Time zone: UTC-5 (Eastern (EST))
  - Summer (DST): UTC-4 (EDT)
- GNIS feature ID: 579282

East Thorndike is a village in Waldo County, Maine, United States. Its elevation is 531 feet (162 m).
