= Belmont, Maine =

Town in Maine, United States

- Town
- Seal

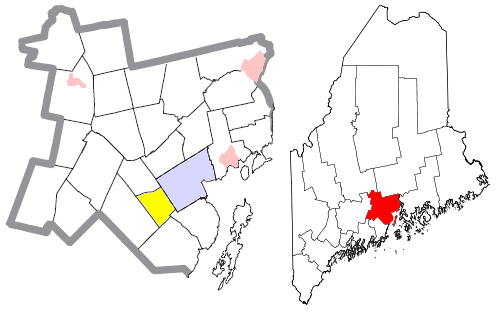
- Location of Belmont (in yellow) in Waldo County and the state of Maine
- Coordinates: 44°22′26″N 69°07′32″W
- Country: United States
- State: Maine
- County: Waldo

Area
  - Total: 14.19 sq mi (36.75 km^{2})
  - Land: 13.61 sq mi (35.25 km^{2})
  - Water: 0.58 sq mi (1.50 km^{2})
- Elevation: 253 ft (77 m)

Population (2020)
  - Total: 976
  - Density: 72/sq mi (27.7/km^{2})
- Time zone: UTC-5 (Eastern (EST))
  - Summer (DST): UTC-4 (EDT)
- ZIP code: 04952
- Area code: 207
- FIPS code: 23-04125
- GNIS feature ID: 582349
- Website: belmontme.org

Belmont is a town in Waldo County, Maine, United States. The population was 976 at the 2020 census. It was originally known as Green Plantation. The squatters who lived there would, when alerted to the impending arrival of law officers, dress as Indians and then ignore the officers.

== Geography ==
According to the United States Census Bureau, the town has a total area of 14.19 square miles (36.75 km^{2}), of which 13.61 square miles (35.25 km^{2}) is land and 0.58 square miles (1.50 km^{2}) is water, chiefly Tilden Pond (357 acres).

The town is crossed by SR 3 and SR 131. It is bordered by Morrill on the north, Belfast on the east, Northport on the southeast, Lincolnville on the south and Searsmont on the west.

== Demographics ==
Historical population
Census	Pop.	Note	%±
1820	744		—
1830	1,042		40.1%
1840	1,378		32.2%
1850	1,486		7.8%
1860	686		−53.8%
1870	628		−8.5%
1880	520		−17.2%
1890	475		−8.7%
1900	352		−25.9%
1910	335		−4.8%
1920	250		−25.4%
1930	227		−9.2%
1940	213		−6.2%
1950	258		21.1%
1960	295		14.3%
1970	349		18.3%
1980	520		49.0%
1990	652		25.4%
2000	821		25.9%
2010	942		14.7%
2020	976		3.6%
U.S. Decennial Census

=== 2010 census ===
As of the census of 2010, there were 942 people, 405 households, and 252 families living in the town. The population density was 69.2 inhabitants per square mile (26.7/km^{2}). There were 462 housing units at an average density of 33.9 per square mile (13.1/km^{2}). The racial makeup of the town was 97.0% White, 0.2% African American, 0.3% Native American, 0.3% Asian, 0.8% from other races, and 1.3% from two or more races. Hispanic or Latino of any race were 0.8% of the population.

There were 405 households, of which 28.9% had children under the age of 18 living with them, 47.9% were married couples living together, 9.4% had a female householder with no husband present, 4.9% had a male householder with no wife present, and 37.8% were non-families. 30.4% of all households were made up of individuals, and 14.3% had someone living alone who was 65 years of age or older. The average household size was 2.33 and the average family size was 2.87.

The median age in the town was 44.8 years. 20.8% of residents were under the age of 18; 5.8% were between the ages of 18 and 24; 23.8% were from 25 to 44; 32.2% were from 45 to 64; and 17.6% were 65 years of age or older. The gender makeup of the town was 47.6% male and 52.4% female.

=== 2000 census ===
As of the census of 2000, there were 821 people, 336 households, and 243 families living in the town. The population density was 60.3 inhabitants per square mile (23.3/km^{2}). There were 393 housing units at an average density of 28.9 per square mile (11.2/km^{2}). The racial makeup of the town was 98.66% White, 0.49% Native American, and 0.85% from two or more races.

There were 336 households, out of which 26.2% had children under the age of 18 living with them, 58.9% were married couples living together, 9.2% had a female householder with no husband present, and 27.4% were non-families. 22.9% of all households were made up of individuals, and 10.7% had someone living alone who was 65 years of age or older. The average household size was 2.44 and the average family size was 2.79.

In the town, the population was spread out, with 23.5% under the age of 18, 7.2% from 18 to 24, 26.6% from 25 to 44, 28.1% from 45 to 64, and 14.6% who were 65 years of age or older. The median age was 40 years. For every 100 females, there were 98.8 males. For every 100 females age 18 and over, there were 93.8 males.

The median income for a household in the town was $29,013, and the median income for a family was $36,875. Males had a median income of $25,197 versus $24,327 for females. The per capita income for the town was $14,942. About 6.3% of families and 10.3% of the population were below the poverty line, including 10.3% of those under age 18 and 13.7% of those age 65 or over.

== Notable person ==
- Josephine Bicknell Neal (1880–1955), physician, encephalitis/meningitis pioneer
