= Passagassawakeag River =

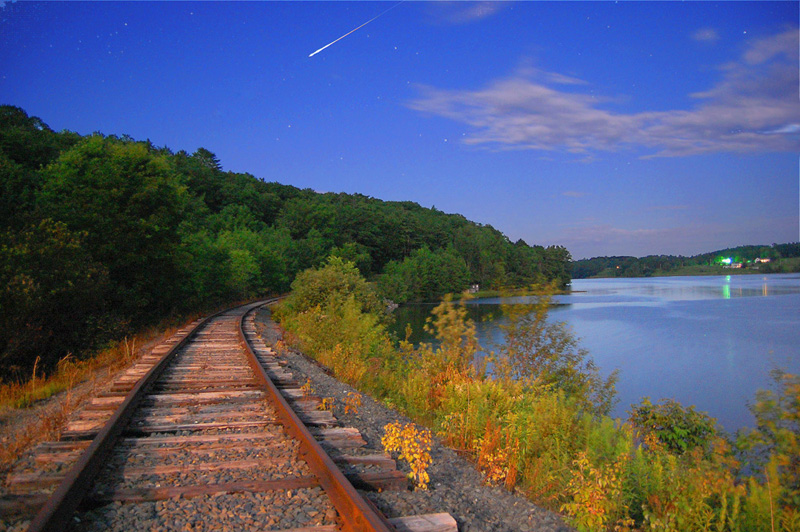
- A moonlight view of the Passagassawakeag River along the tracks of the Belfast and Moosehead Lake Railroad just beyond the old Upper Bridge a little more than a mile inland from Belfast, ME, where it empties into Belfast Bay.

Location
- Country: United States

Physical characteristics
- Source: Lake Passagassawakeag
  - location: Maine
  - elevation: 308 feet (90 m)
- Mouth
  - location: Belfast Bay
  - coordinates: 44°25′48″N 69°00′22″W
  - elevation: sea level

The Passagassawakeag River (/pæsəɡæsəˈwɑːkɛɡ, pəˌsɑː-/) is a 16-mile-long (26 km) river in Waldo County, Maine in the United States. From the outlet of Lake Passagassawakeag (44°30′04″N 69°07′59″W) in Brooks, it runs south and east to its estuary in Belfast, Maine. The river empties into Belfast Bay, an inlet of Penobscot Bay, where it passes under US Route 1.

The waterway's name is of local Native American origin and is believed to mean "a sturgeon's place" or "a place for spearing sturgeon by torchlight."

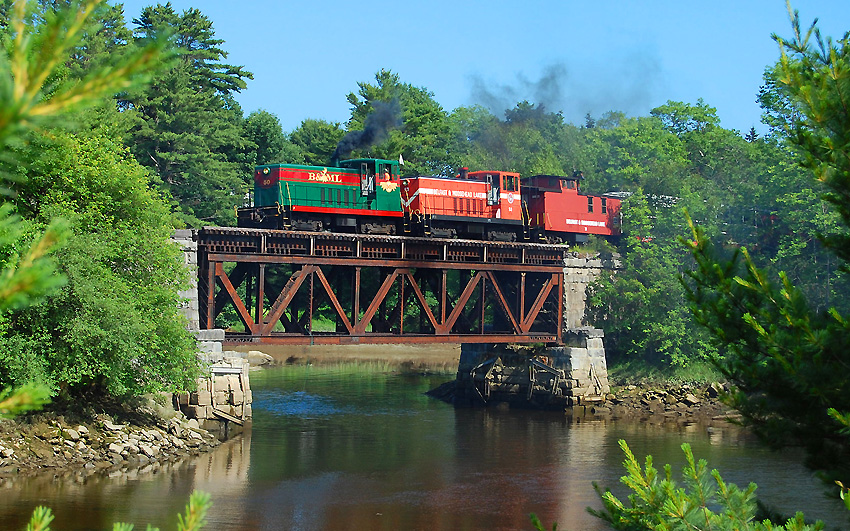
A pair of General Electric 70-ton diesel locomotives on the Belfast and Moosehead Lake Railroad, crossing the river heading inland from Belfast Bay.
