= Perry's Nut House =

Tourist stop in Belfast, Maine

Coordinates: 44°26′00″N 68°59′54″W

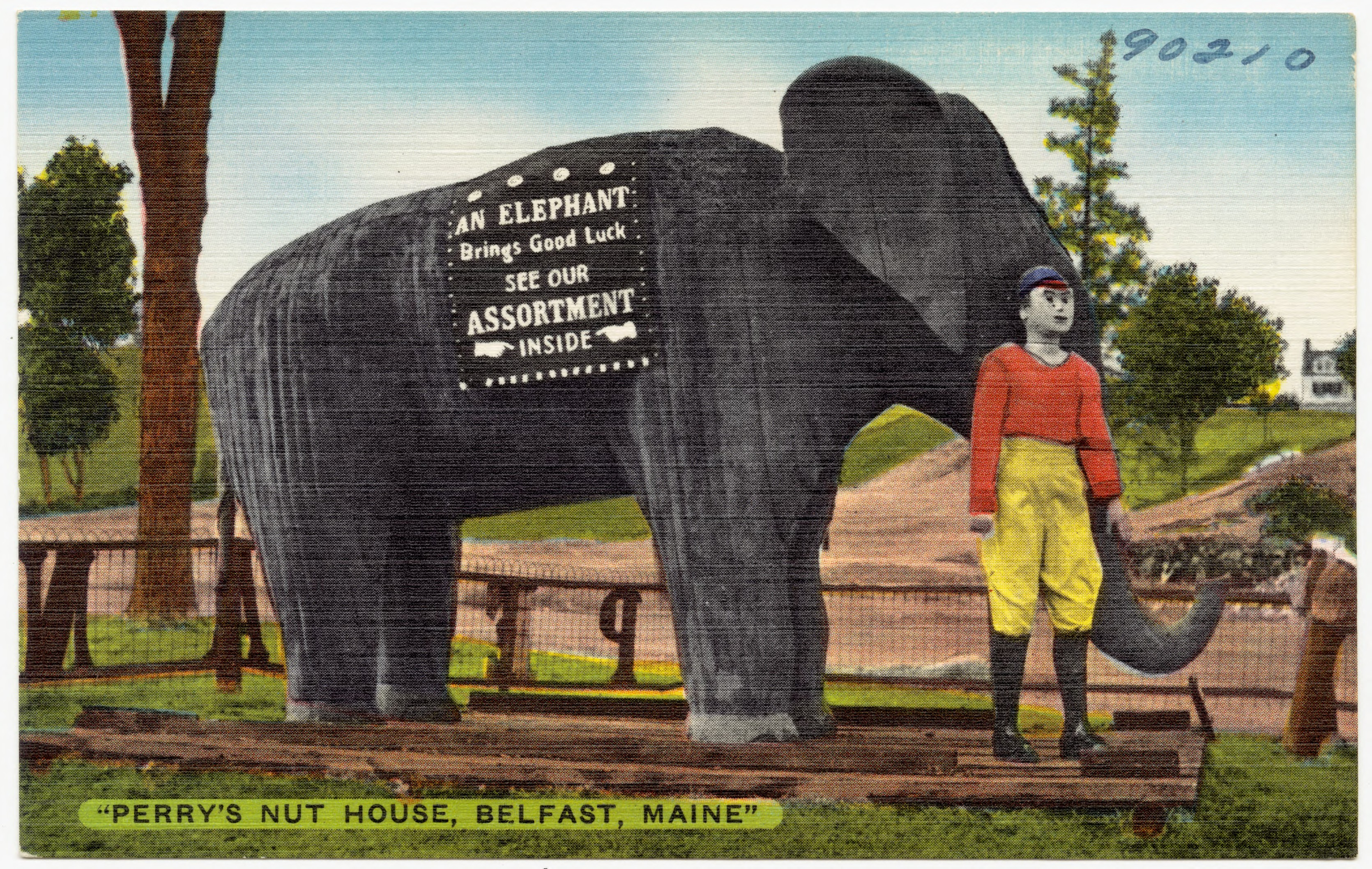
Perry's Nut House, Belfast, Maine -- an elephant brings good luck, see our assortment inside. Tichnor Brothers Postcard. Between circa 1930 and circa 1945

Perry's Nut House is a tourist stop and store on Route One in Belfast, Maine.

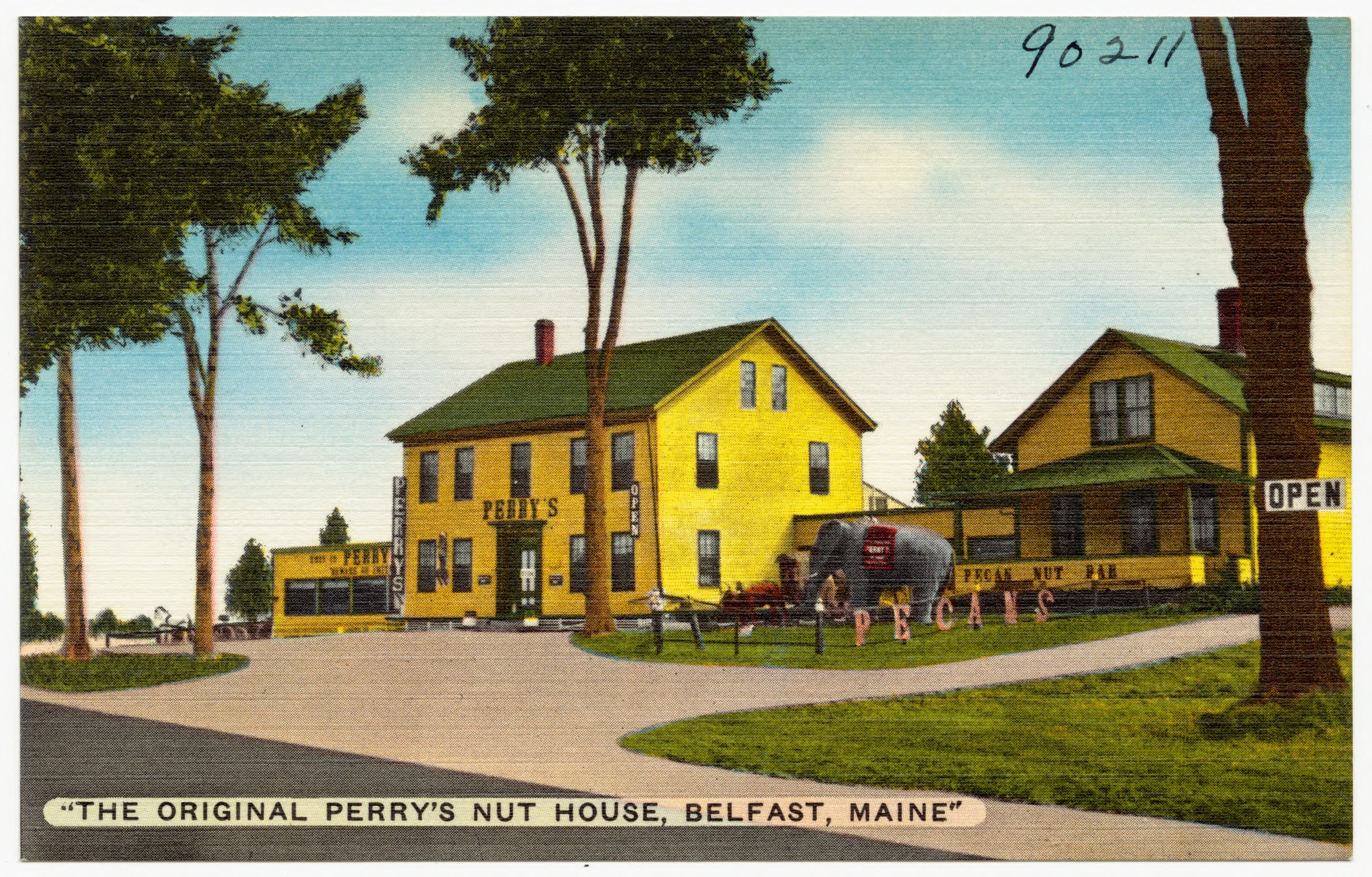
The Original Perry's Nut House, Belfast, Maine.

Opened in 1927, Perry's Nut House is a classic example of an American roadside attraction. Located on the coastal road to Bar Harbor, Perry's Nut House features many large painted animal sculptures outside the building. And, until 1997, inside the building was a display of stuffed animals, exotic nuts and seeds from around the world. Perry's also makes and sells traditional homemade fudge and candies along with Maine-themed souvenirs, retro and wooden toys and gag gifts.

In 1997, the third owners (Diane & John Bailey) sold most of the original taxidermy animals and display items in an auction that was held in the store. As of 2009, however, the current owners of Perry's Nut House are working hard to restore the feeling of the old Perry's. Several original items have been acquired and have reappeared in the store, including a gorilla (Ape-Raham, restored Jan. - May 2012), a 21-foot python skin, a very large stuffed albatross, a 13-foot alligator, a cougar and a baboon.

In the early 1950s, Perry's Nut House used a catchy radio jingle: "Pack up the kids. Jump in the car. Drive to Perry's Nut House, and there you are. Right on the coast, route number 1. Belfast, Maine, Oh golly what fun."

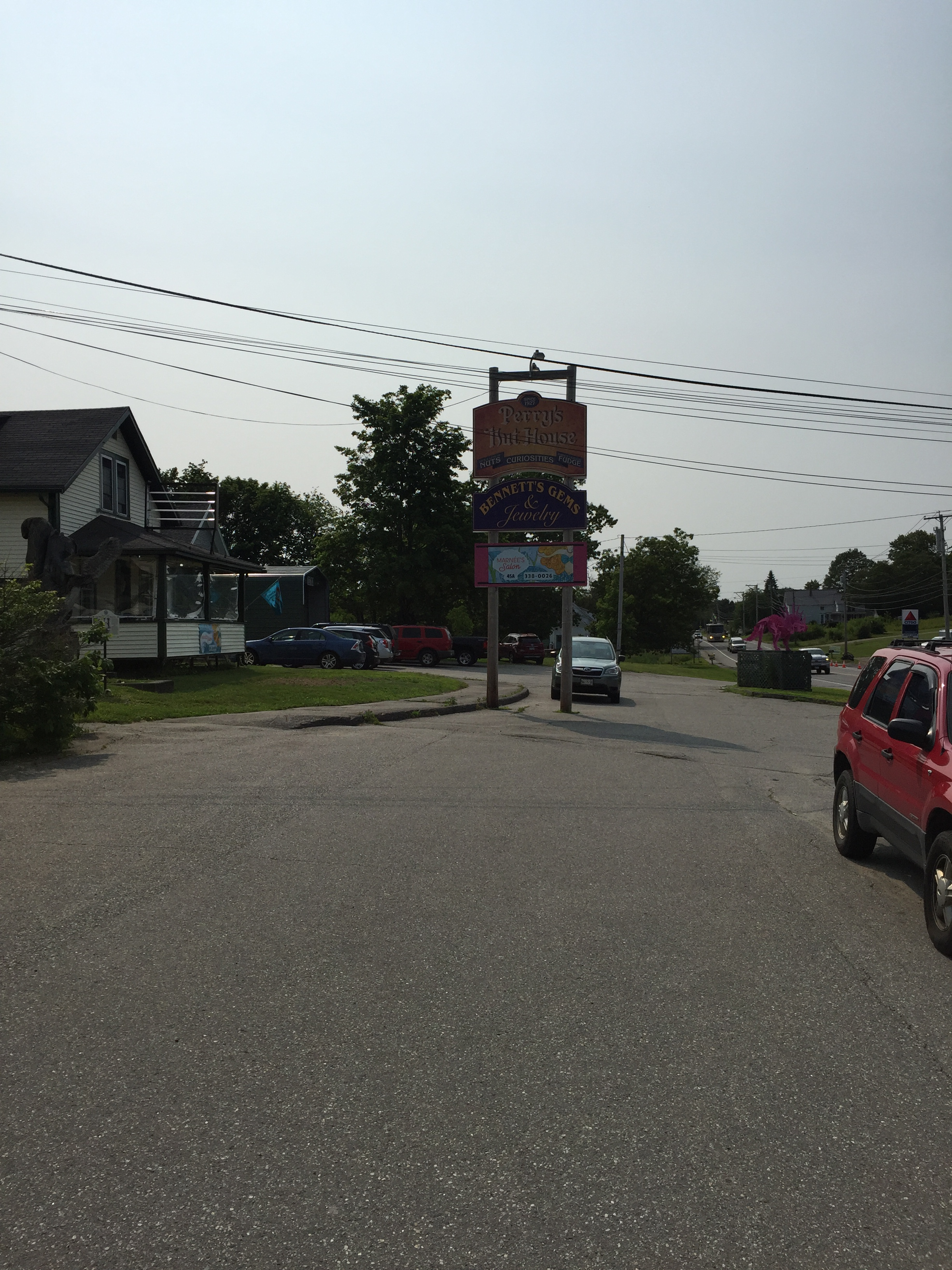
Sign for Perry's Nut House in Belfast, Maine. A longtime local landmark and tourist attraction, it features a gift shop, homemade fudge, nuts, and many curious displays to entertain guests.
