= Belfast Free Library =

Public library in Maine

Coordinates: 44.42524°N 69.00524°W

- Location: 106 High Street; Belfast, Maine, United States
- Type: Public
- Established: 1887

Other information
- Website: belfastlibrary.org

The Belfast Free Library is a public library in Belfast, Maine. The library was established in 1887 by act of the Maine Legislature following donations from Paul Hazeltine and Nathanial Wilson.
