= Linden Frederick =

American painter

Linden Frederick is an American painter long a resident in Belfast, Maine. Frequently considered a realist, he is recognized for his depictions of rural and small town scenes.

Born in 1953 in upstate New York, he moved to Maine in 1990. He has had 22 one-person shows since his first show at Cooley Gallery, CT in 1989. Since 2003, he has been represented by Forum Gallery, NYC.

In 2017, Frederick took part in a collaborative project entitled Night Stories. Frederick submitted 15 paintings for exhibit, and writers contributed stories inspired by each one. Writers taking part included Richard Russo, Andre Dubus III, Joshua Ferris, Lily King, Dennis Lehane, Lois Lowry, Luanne Rice, Ted Tally, Daniel Woodrell, Louise Erdrich, Lawrence Kasdan, Anthony Doerr, Elizabeth Strout, Tess Gerritsen, and Ann Patchett. The exhibit opened at Forum Gallery in New York City and subsequently moved to the Center for Maine Contemporary Art in Rockland.

Frederick's paintings are in many corporate collections, as well as the Portland Museum of Art, Maine, and the Farnsworth Art Museum, Rockland, ME.
