= East Troy, Maine =

- Village
- Location within Maine
- Coordinates: 44°40′14″N 69°12′20″W
- Country: United States
- State: Maine
- County: Waldo
- Elevation: 348 ft (106 m)
- Time zone: UTC-5 (Eastern (EST))
  - Summer (DST): UTC-4 (EDT)
- Area code: 207
- GNIS feature ID: 579283

East Troy is a village in the town of Troy, Waldo County, Maine, United States. East Troy forms part of the town of Troy rather than constituting a separately incorporated municipality
