= Searsport (CDP), Maine =

Searsport, Maine
- Census-designated place
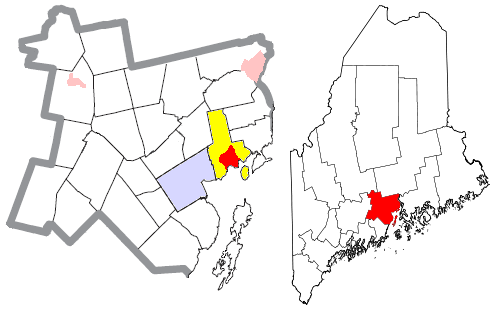
- Location of Searsport (in red) in Waldo County and the state of Maine
- Coordinates: 44°27′56″N 68°55′07″W
- Country: United States
- State: Maine
- County: Waldo

Area
  - Total: 5.34 sq mi (13.83 km^{2})
  - Land: 4.35 sq mi (11.27 km^{2})
  - Water: 0.99 sq mi (2.56 km^{2})
- Elevation: 98 ft (30 m)

Population (2020)
  - Total: 999
  - Density: 229.6/sq mi (88.66/km^{2})
- Time zone: UTC-5 (Eastern (EST))
  - Summer (DST): UTC-4 (EDT)
- ZIP code: 04974
- Area code: 207
- FIPS code: 23-66600
- GNIS feature ID: 2377955

Searsport is a census-designated place (CDP) in the town of Searsport in Waldo County, Maine, United States. The population was 999 at the 2020 census.

== Geography ==
According to the United States Census Bureau, the CDP has a total area of 5.5 square miles (14.3 km^{2}), of which 4.4 square miles (11.3 km^{2}) is land and 1.1 square miles (3.0 km^{2}) (20.80%) is water.

== Demographics ==
Historical population
Census	Pop.	Note	%±
2020	999		—
U.S. Decennial Census

As of the census of 2000, there were 1,102 people, 532 households, and 303 families residing in the CDP. The population density was 251.4 inhabitants per square mile (97.1/km^{2}). There were 625 housing units at an average density of 142.6 per square mile (55.1/km^{2}). The racial makeup of the CDP was 98.00% White, 0.18% Black or African American, 0.73% Native American, 0.09% from other races, and 1.00% from two or more races. Hispanic or Latino of any race were 0.18% of the population.

There were 532 households, out of which 20.5% had children under the age of 18 living with them, 43.4% were married couples living together, 12.2% had a female householder with no husband present, and 42.9% were non-families. 36.3% of all households were made up of individuals, and 18.8% had someone living alone who was 65 years of age or older. The average household size was 2.07 and the average family size was 2.67.

In the CDP, the population was spread out, with 18.5% under the age of 18, 5.5% from 18 to 24, 23.3% from 25 to 44, 30.9% from 45 to 64, and 21.7% who were 65 years of age or older. The median age was 46 years. For every 100 females, there were 83.7 males. For every 100 females age 18 and over, there were 79.2 males.

The median income for a household in the CDP was $27,222, and the median income for a family was $35,357. Males had a median income of $31,677 versus $21,190 for females. The per capita income for the CDP was $24,177. About 12.0% of families and 18.6% of the population were below the poverty line, including 48.9% of those under age 18 and 10.2% of those age 65 or over.
