= Belfast Bay (Maine) =

Bay in Waldo County, Maine, United States

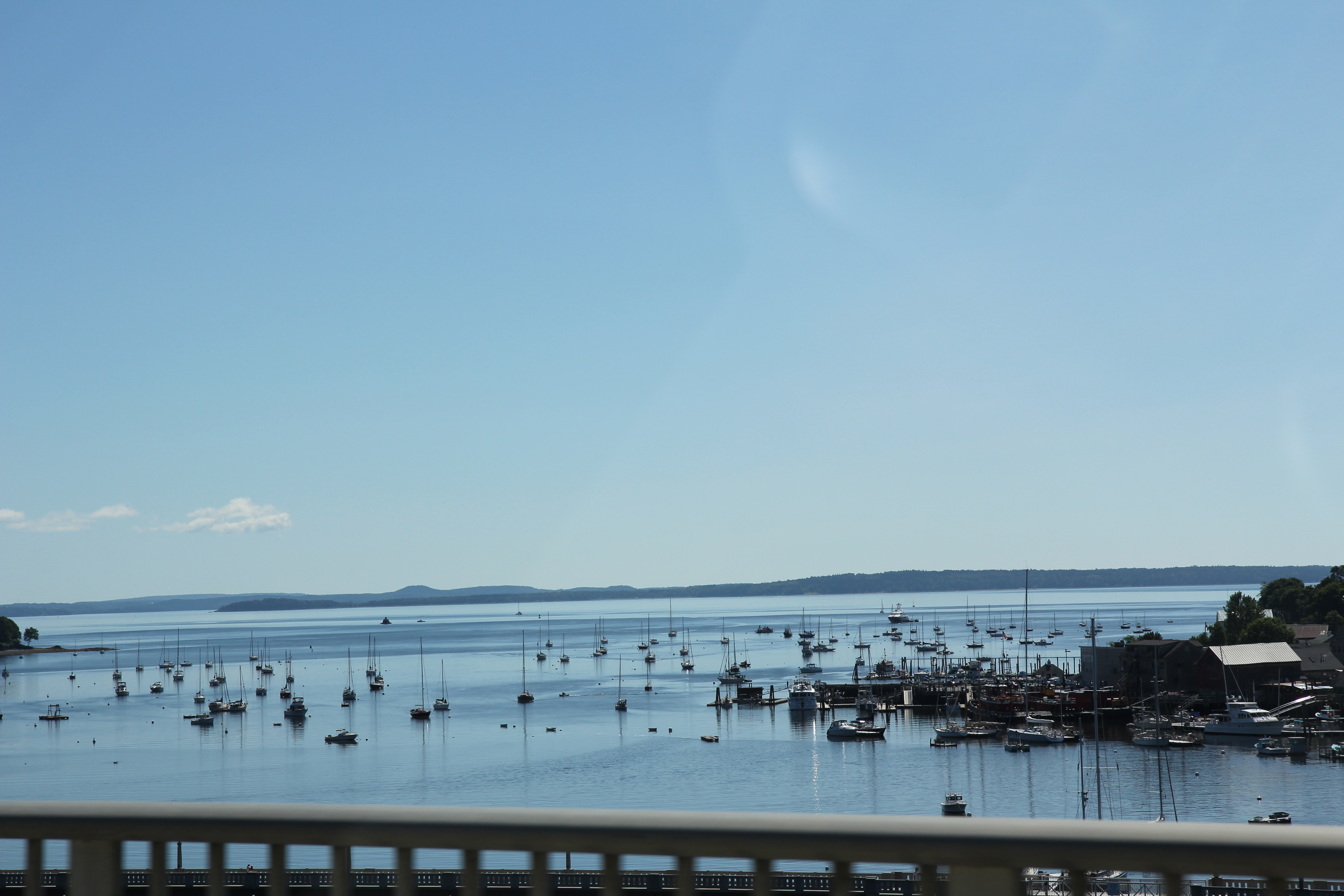
- Passagassawakeag River emptying into Belfast Bay from U.S. Route 1 bridge

- Location within Maine Location within the United States

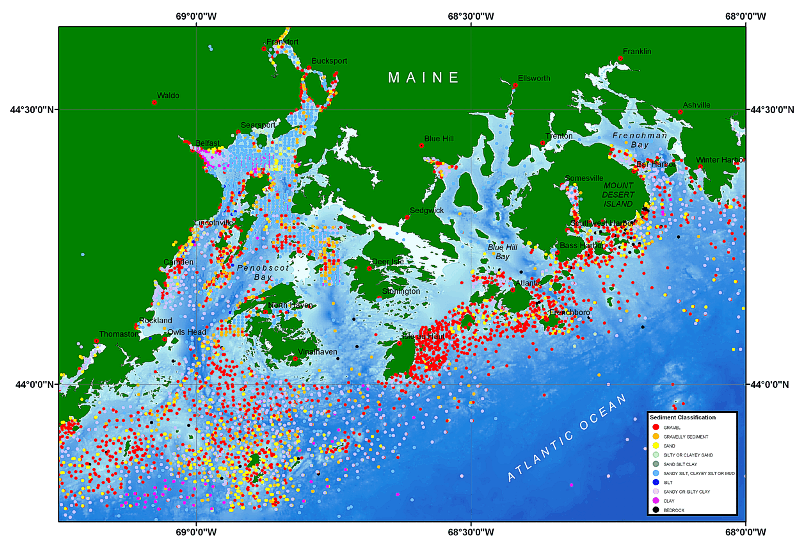
- Penobscot Bay
- Location: Maine, United States
- Coordinates: 44°24′42″N 68°57′57″W, 44°25′41″N 69°00′07″W
- River sources: Passagassawakeag River, Goose River
- Ocean/sea sources: Atlantic Ocean
- Settlements: Belfast, Maine

Belfast Bay also known as Passagassawakeag Bay is an inlet of the Penobscot Bay, Gulf of Maine and Atlantic Ocean located by Belfast, Maine in south central Maine.
