= Regional School Unit 71 =

School district in York County, Maine, United States

Regional School Unit 21

Location
- Coordinates: 43°23′N 70°31′W

Regional School Unit 21 (RSU 21), formerly Maine School Administrative District 71 (MSAD 71 or SAD 71) is a school district containing the towns of Kennebunk, Maine and Kennebunkport, Maine. It currently (as of July 2005) provides 5 schools for the children within its boundaries:

- Kennebunk Elementary School — a new school building, replacing the older Cousins School and Park Street School. It provides classes for kindergarten through grade 3 for children from Kennebunk.
- Sea Road School — located in the lower village of Kennebunk, it provides classes for grade 4 and grade 5 for children from Kennebunk.
- Consolidated School — provides classes for kindergarten through grade 5 for children from Kennebunkport.
- Middle School of the Kennebunks — provides classes for grade 6 through grade 8 for all children in the district.
- Kennebunk High School — provides classes for grade 9 through grade 12 for all children in the district. It is also attended by many students from nearby Arundel, which has no high school.
