= Swanville, Maine =

Town in Maine, United States

- Town
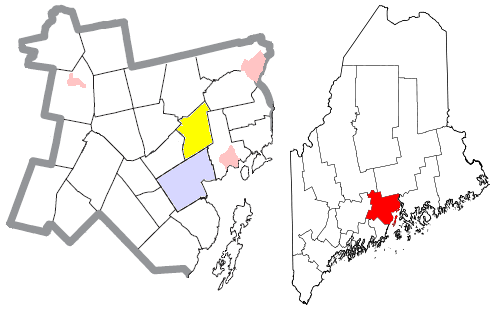
- Location of Swanville (in yellow) in Waldo County and the state of Maine
- Coordinates: 44°30′18″N 69°0′43″W
- Country: United States
- State: Maine
- County: Waldo

Area
  - Total: 21.64 sq mi (56.05 km^{2})
  - Land: 19.72 sq mi (51.07 km^{2})
  - Water: 1.92 sq mi (4.97 km^{2})
- Elevation: 364 ft (111 m)

Population (2020)
  - Total: 1,377
  - Density: 70/sq mi (27/km^{2})
- Time zone: UTC-5 (Eastern (EST))
  - Summer (DST): UTC-4 (EDT)
- ZIP code: 04915
- Area code: 207
- FIPS code: 23-75525
- GNIS feature ID: 582758
- Website: www.swanvillemaine.org

Swanville is a town in Waldo County, Maine, United States. The population was 1,377 at the 2020 census.

== History ==
The town of Swanville lies within the Muscongus Patent of 1630, which from 1720 was known as the Waldo Patent. It was incorporated on February 19, 1818 (or 1819), following a petition made in November 1816 by James Leach and 37 others. Before that time, it was known variously as "The Plantation of Swan", "Swan's Plantation", and "Swan's Tract". Late 19th century industries included farming, brick-making, soap-making, and quarrying. The Oak Hill Quarry opened in 1872, producing a dark blue-gray granite that was used for paving stones.

== Geography ==
According to the United States Census Bureau, the town has a total area of 21.64 square miles (56.05 km^{2}), of which 19.72 square miles (51.07 km^{2}) is land and 1.92 square miles (4.97 km^{2}) is water. The two largest water bodies in the town are Swan Lake (1364 acres, some of which is in the towns of Searsport and Frankfort), and Toddy Pond (160 acres, some of which is in the town of Brooks.

The Town of Swanville has a dam owned and operated by Maine Hydro, now known as Goose River Hydro, Inc., which also owns the water rights. In 1979, an agreement was brokered between the towns of Swanville, Frankfort, Searsport and Goose River Hydro, Inc. The agreement covers water levels as well as Goose River Hydro's responsibility for dam and land surrounding it. In the late 19th century, the dam was operated by the Belfast Paper Mill Company and used only intermittently.

== Demographics ==
Historical population
Census	Pop.	Note	%±
1820	503		—
1830	633		25.8%
1840	919		45.2%
1850	944		2.7%
1860	914		−3.2%
1870	770		−15.8%
1880	703		−8.7%
1890	689		−2.0%
1900	502		−27.1%
1910	467		−7.0%
1920	396		−15.2%
1930	365		−7.8%
1940	373		2.2%
1950	437		17.2%
1960	514		17.6%
1970	487		−5.3%
1980	873		79.3%
1990	1,130		29.4%
2000	1,357		20.1%
2010	1,388		2.3%
2020	1,377		−0.8%
U.S. Decennial Census

=== 2010 census ===
As of the census of 2010, there were 1,388 people, 558 households, and 368 families living in the town. The population density was 70.4 inhabitants per square mile (27.2/km^{2}). There were 793 housing units at an average density of 40.2 per square mile (15.5/km^{2}). The racial makeup of the town was 97.3% White, 0.1% African American, 0.1% Native American, 0.5% Asian, 0.1% from other races, and 1.9% from two or more races. Hispanic or Latino of any race were 0.4% of the population.

There were 558 households, of which 30.3% had children under the age of 18 living with them, 48.6% were married couples living together, 12.4% had a female householder with no husband present, 5.0% had a male householder with no wife present, and 34.1% were non-families. 25.8% of all households were made up of individuals, and 7% had someone living alone who was 65 years of age or older. The average household size was 2.49 and the average family size was 2.97.

The median age in the town was 40.2 years. 23.6% of residents were under the age of 18; 7.3% were between the ages of 18 and 24; 25.5% were from 25 to 44; 33.3% were from 45 to 64; and 10.4% were 65 years of age or older. The gender makeup of the town was 49.3% male and 50.7% female.

=== 2000 census ===
As of the census of 2000, there were 1,357 people, 522 households, and 371 families living in the town. The population density was 68.7 inhabitants per square mile (26.5/km^{2}). There were 730 housing units at an average density of 36.9 per square mile (14.2/km^{2}). The racial makeup of the town was 96.54% White, 0.15% African American, 0.22% Native American, 0.15% Asian, and 2.95% from two or more races. Hispanic or Latino of any race were 1.11% of the population.

There were 522 households, out of which 36.4% had children under the age of 18 living with them, 53.8% were married couples living together, 11.3% had a female householder with no husband present, and 28.9% were non-families. 22.6% of all households were made up of individuals, and 5.7% had someone living alone who was 65 years of age or older. The average household size was 2.60 and the average family size was 3.03.

In the town, the population was spread out, with 28.4% under the age of 18, 7.1% from 18 to 24, 30.8% from 25 to 44, 24.4% from 45 to 64, and 9.3% who were 65 years of age or older. The median age was 36 years. For every 100 females, there were 98.4 males. For every 100 females age 18 and over, there were 96.6 males.

The median income for a household in the town was $31,417, and the median income for a family was $35,833. Males had a median income of $28,083 versus $19,861 for females. The per capita income for the town was $14,483. About 10.5% of families and 14.6% of the population were below the poverty line, including 18.8% of those under age 18 and 7.7% of those age 65 or over.

== See also ==
- Swan Lake
- Swan Lake State Park
