= Waldo County, Maine =

County in Maine, US

- County
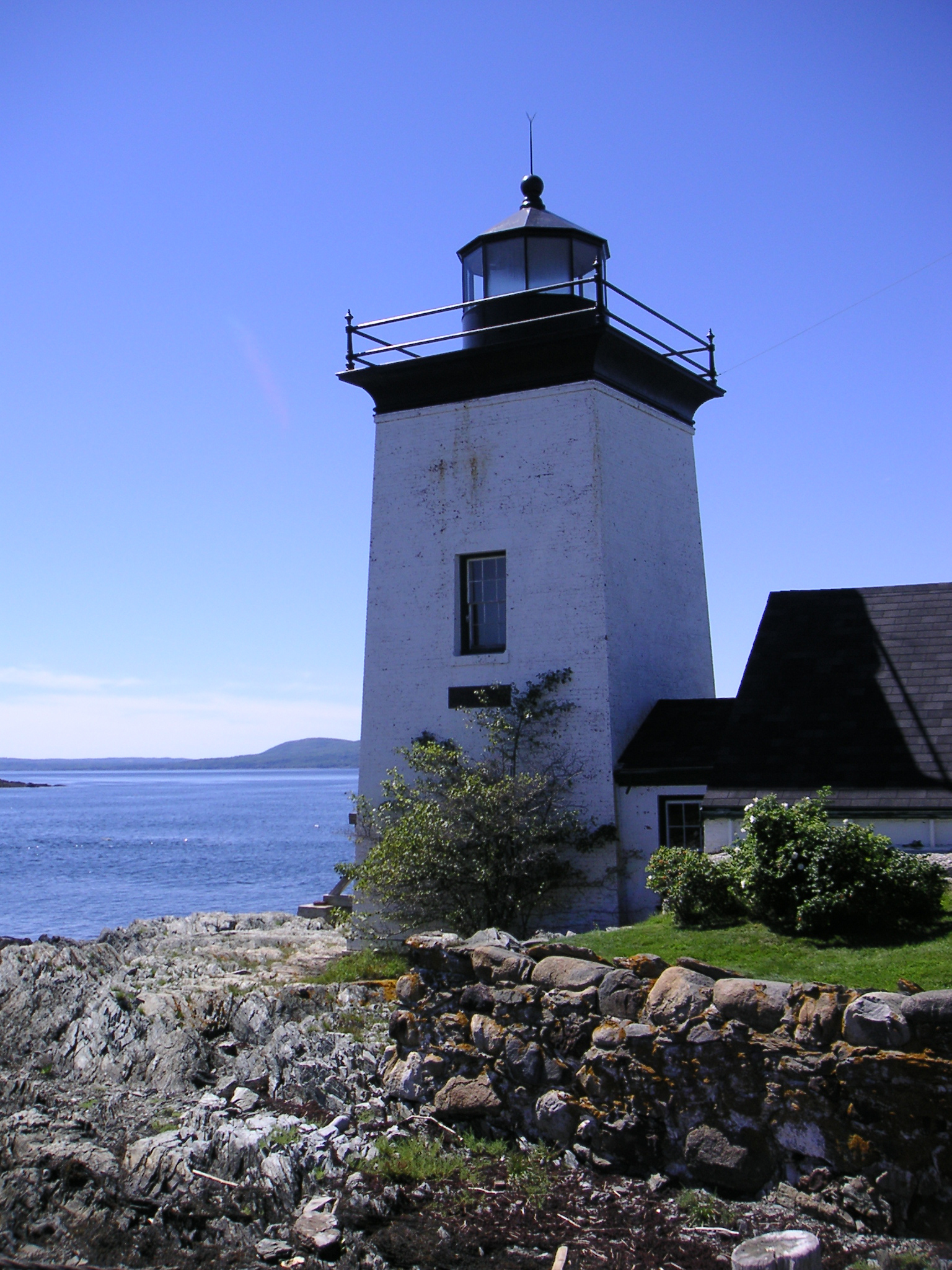
- Grindel Point Light

- Location within the U.S. state of Maine
- Coordinates: 44°28′29″N 69°07′05″W
- Country: United States
- State: Maine
- Founded: 1827
- Named for: Samuel Waldo
- Seat: Belfast
- Largest city: Belfast

Area
  - Total: 853 sq mi (2,210 km^{2})
  - Land: 730 sq mi (1,900 km^{2})
  - Water: 123 sq mi (320 km^{2}) 14%

Population (2020)
  - Total: 39,607
  - Estimate (2025): 40,693 ▲
  - Density: 54/sq mi (21/km^{2})
- Time zone: UTC−5 (Eastern)
  - Summer (DST): UTC−4 (EDT)
- Congressional district: 2nd
- Website: waldocountyme.gov

Waldo County is a county in the state of Maine, United States. As of the 2020 census, the population was 39,607. Its county seat is Belfast. The county was founded on February 7, 1827, from a portion of Hancock County and named after Brigadier-General Samuel Waldo, proprietor of the Waldo Patent.

It is the namesake of the USS Waldo County.

== Geography ==
According to the U.S. Census Bureau, the county has an area of 853 square miles (2,210 km^{2}), of which 730 square miles (1,900 km^{2}) is land and 123 square miles (320 km^{2}) (14%) is water.

=== Adjacent counties ===
- Penobscot County – northeast
- Hancock County – east
- Knox County – south
- Lincoln County – southwest
- Kennebec County – west
- Somerset County – northwest

=== National protected area ===
- Carlton Pond Waterfowl Production Area

== Demographics ==
Historical population
Census	Pop.	Note	%±
1830	29,788		—
1840	41,509		39.3%
1850	47,230		13.8%
1860	38,447		−18.6%
1870	34,522		−10.2%
1880	32,463		−6.0%
1890	27,759		−14.5%
1900	24,185		−12.9%
1910	23,383		−3.3%
1920	21,328		−8.8%
1930	20,286		−4.9%
1940	21,159		4.3%
1950	21,687		2.5%
1960	22,632		4.4%
1970	23,328		3.1%
1980	28,414		21.8%
1990	33,018		16.2%
2000	36,280		9.9%
2010	38,786		6.9%
2020	39,607		2.1%
2025 (est.)	40,693	▲	2.7%
U.S. Decennial Census; 1790–1960 1900–1990; 1990–2000 2010–2016 2018

=== 2020 census ===
As of the 2020 census, the county had a population of 39,607. Of the residents, 18.5% were under the age of 18 and 24.2% were 65 years of age or older; the median age was 47.3 years. For every 100 females there were 96.8 males, and for every 100 females age 18 and over there were 94.8 males. 9.5% of residents lived in urban areas and 90.5% lived in rural areas.

The racial makeup of the county was 93.7% White, 0.4% Black or African American, 0.4% American Indian and Alaska Native, 0.5% Asian, 0.0% Native Hawaiian and Pacific Islander, 0.6% from some other race, and 4.5% from two or more races. Hispanic or Latino residents of any race comprised 1.4% of the population.

There were 17,143 households in the county, of which 23.6% had children under the age of 18 living with them and 24.5% had a female householder with no spouse or partner present. About 29.9% of all households were made up of individuals and 14.9% had someone living alone who was 65 years of age or older.

There were 21,921 housing units, of which 21.8% were vacant. Among occupied housing units, 78.4% were owner-occupied and 21.6% were renter-occupied. The homeowner vacancy rate was 1.3% and the rental vacancy rate was 8.1%.

Waldo County, Maine – Racial and ethnic composition Note: the US Census treats Hispanic/Latino as an ethnic category. This table excludes Latinos from the racial categories and assigns them to a separate category. Hispanics/Latinos may be of any race.
Race / Ethnicity (NH = Non-Hispanic)	Pop 2000	Pop 2010	Pop 2020	% 2000	% 2010	% 2020
White alone (NH)	35,382	37,453	36,883	97.52%	96.56%	93.12%
Black or African American alone (NH)	62	122	135	0.17%	0.31%	0.34%
Native American or Alaska Native alone (NH)	131	159	140	0.36%	0.40%	0.35%
Asian alone (NH)	71	149	200	0.19%	0.38%	0.50%
Pacific Islander alone (NH)	5	13	12	0.01%	0.03%	0.03%
Other race alone (NH)	27	26	134	0.07%	0.06%	0.33%
Mixed race or Multiracial (NH)	387	515	1,544	1.06%	1.32%	3.89%
Hispanic or Latino (any race)	215	349	559	0.59%	0.89%	1.41%
Total	36,280	38,786	39,607	100.00%	100.00%	100.00%

=== 2010 census ===
As of the 2010 United States census, there were 38,786 people, 16,431 households, and 10,627 families living in the county. The population density was 53.1 inhabitants per square mile (20.5 inhabitants/km^{2}). There were 21,566 housing units at an average density of 29.5 units per square mile (11.4 units/km^{2}). The racial makeup of the county was 97.1% white, 0.4% Asian, 0.4% American Indian, 0.4% black or African American, 0.2% from other races, and 1.4% from two or more races. Those of Hispanic or Latino origin made up 0.9% of the population. In terms of ancestry, 26.3% were English, 21.0% were Irish, 19.0% were French, 9.2% American, 7.0% Scottish, 6.6% Italian, 2.7% Polish, and 2.2% Scotch-Irish.

Of the 16,431 households, 27.7% had children under the age of 18 living with them, 50.0% were married couples living together, 9.9% had a female householder with no husband present, 35.3% were non-families, and 27.7% of all households were made up of individuals. The average household size was 2.33 and the average family size was 2.81. The median age was 44.1 years.

The county's median household income was $41,312 and the median family income was $50,222. Males had a median income of $38,960 versus $30,321 for females. The county's per capita income was $22,213. About 10.2% of families and 14.6% of the population were below the poverty line, including 20.9% of those under age 18 and 11.6% of those age 65 or over.

=== 2000 census ===
As of the census of 2000, there were 36,280 people, 14,726 households, and 10,057 families living in the county. The population density was 50 people per square mile (19 people/km^{2}). There were 18,904 housing units at an average density of 26 per square mile (10/km^{2}). The racial makeup of the county was 97.89% White, 0.19% Black or African American, 0.40% Native American, 0.21% Asian, 0.01% Pacific Islander, 0.16% from other races, and 1.15% from two or more races. 0.59% of the population were Hispanic or Latino of any race. 24.8% were of English, 14.7% United States or American, 12.7% Irish, 8.5% French and 5.6% German ancestry. 97.1% spoke English and 1.5% French as their first language.

There were 14,726 households, out of which 30.70% had children under the age of 18 living with them, 55.20% were married couples living together, 9.00% had a female householder with no husband present, and 31.70% were non-families. 24.90% of all households were made up of individuals, and 9.60% had someone living alone who was 65 years of age or older. The average household size was 2.43 and the average family size was 2.88.

In the county, the population was spread out, with 24.20% under the age of 18, 7.50% from 18 to 24, 27.80% from 25 to 44, 26.80% from 45 to 64, and 13.60% who were 65 years of age or older. The median age was 39 years. For every 100 females there were 96.60 males. For every 100 females age 18 and over, there were 93.80 males.

The median income for a household in the county was $33,986, and the median income for a family was $40,402. Males had a median income of $29,644 versus $23,816 for females. The per capita income for the county was $17,438. About 10.90% of families and 13.90% of the population were below the poverty line, including 18.60% of those under age 18 and 12.20% of those age 65 or over.

== Politics ==
Prior to the late 20th century, Waldo County was a solidly Republican county, going for the Democratic nominee only once between 1920 and 1988 — the one Democratic victory was Lyndon B. Johnson's landslide victory in 1964.

Waldo was one of a handful of counties nationwide that voted for independent Ross Perot in 1992. In each election since 2004, Waldo County has been won by a Democrat, but never with more than 55% of the vote.

It is the only one of the three Maine counties that voted Perot for president in 1992 that did not vote for Donald Trump in any of his presidential runs, supporting Democrats since the early 21st century. Trump only lost the county by 62 votes in 2016, but lost it by larger margins in 2020 and in 2024.

=== Voter registration ===
Voter registration and party enrollment as of March 2024
Democratic	9,845	34%
Republican	9,095	31.41%
Unenrolled	8,189	28.28%
Green Independent	1,328	4.59%
No Labels	395	1.36%
Libertarian	100	0.35%
Total	28,952	100%

United States presidential election results for Waldo County, Maine
Year	Republican		Democratic		Third party(ies)	
Year	No.	%	No.	%	No.	%
1908	2,491	63.22%	1,335	33.88%	114	2.89%
1912	881	18.20%	2,145	44.31%	1,815	37.49%
1916	2,418	47.58%	2,539	49.96%	125	2.46%
1920	4,383	71.52%	1,666	27.19%	79	1.29%
1924	4,003	75.80%	1,125	21.30%	153	2.90%
1928	4,851	77.07%	1,402	22.28%	41	0.65%
1932	4,505	53.21%	3,907	46.14%	55	0.65%
1936	5,309	64.97%	2,678	32.77%	185	2.26%
1940	5,170	61.56%	3,214	38.27%	14	0.17%
1944	4,291	70.30%	1,807	29.60%	6	0.10%
1948	4,371	74.21%	1,469	24.94%	50	0.85%
1952	6,363	80.29%	1,545	19.50%	17	0.21%
1956	6,590	82.64%	1,384	17.36%	0	0.00%
1960	6,844	70.64%	2,845	29.36%	0	0.00%
1964	3,324	38.11%	5,397	61.87%	2	0.02%
1968	4,821	56.19%	3,525	41.08%	234	2.73%
1972	6,480	68.78%	2,941	31.21%	1	0.01%
1976	6,289	54.06%	4,853	41.72%	491	4.22%
1980	6,514	49.57%	4,883	37.16%	1,743	13.26%
1984	8,814	62.22%	5,289	37.34%	63	0.44%
1988	8,236	55.73%	6,402	43.32%	140	0.95%
1992	5,241	28.29%	6,472	34.93%	6,816	36.79%
1996	5,318	30.78%	8,012	46.37%	3,949	22.85%
2000	8,689	45.40%	8,477	44.29%	1,972	10.30%
2004	10,309	46.19%	11,555	51.77%	454	2.03%
2008	9,423	43.13%	11,967	54.77%	460	2.11%
2012	9,058	43.01%	11,296	53.63%	707	3.36%
2016	10,378	45.70%	10,440	45.98%	1,889	8.32%
2020	11,196	46.03%	12,345	50.76%	781	3.21%
2024	11,815	47.02%	12,661	50.38%	654	2.60%

== Communities ==
=== City ===
- Belfast (county seat)

=== Towns ===
- Belmont
- Brooks
- Burnham
- Frankfort
- Freedom
- Islesboro
- Jackson
- Knox
- Liberty
- Lincolnville
- Monroe
- Montville
- Morrill
- Northport
- Palermo
- Prospect
- Searsmont
- Searsport
- Stockton Springs
- Swanville
- Thorndike
- Troy
- Unity
- Waldo
- Winterport

=== Census-designated places ===
- Searsport
- Unity
- Winterport

=== Other unincorporated villages ===
- East Thorndike
- East Troy
- Sandy Point

== Education ==
K-12 school districts include:

- Islesboro School District
- Northport Public Schools
- Regional School Unit 12
- Regional School Unit 20
- Regional School Unit 22
- Regional School Unit 25
- Regional School Unit 71
- School Administrative District 03
- School Administrative District 53

There is also an elementary school district, Lincolnville School District, and a secondary school district, Five Town Community School District.

== Cultural references ==
Waldo County features in Nathaniel Hawthorne's classic novel The House of the Seven Gables as the site of extensive landholdings once claimed by the formerly aristocratic Pyncheon family.

== Notable people ==
- Emily Browne Powell (1847-1938), writer; president, Pacific Coast Women's Press Association
- Harrison M. Hayford (1916-2001), scholar, editor

== See also ==
- National Register of Historic Places listings in Waldo County, Maine
