= Howell, Lincolnshire =

Hamlet in the North Kesteven district of Lincolnshire

Coordinates: 53.002122°N 0.309025°W

Howell
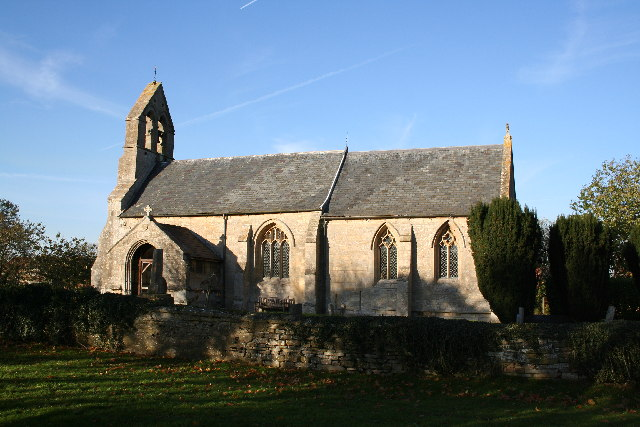
- Church of St Oswald, Howell

- Location within Lincolnshire
- OS grid reference: TF135463
  - London: 105 mi (169 km) S
- Civil parish: Asgarby and Howell
- District: North Kesteven
- Shire county: Lincolnshire
- Region: East Midlands
- Country: England
- Sovereign state: United Kingdom
- Post town: SLEAFORD
- Postcode district: NG34
- Police: Lincolnshire
- Fire: Lincolnshire
- Ambulance: East Midlands
- UK Parliament: Sleaford and North Hykeham

Howell is a village in the civil parish of Asgarby and Howell, in the North Kesteven district of Lincolnshire, England, approximately 1 mile (1.6 km) north of the A17, 4 miles (6 km) east from Sleaford, and 1.5 miles (2.4 km) north from Heckington. In 1921 the parish had a population of 58.

== History ==
In the Domesday Book of 1086, the village is written as "Hwelle". It consisted of 6 villagers, 14 freemen, 7 smallholders, land for 4 plough teams, a 32 acres (0.13 km^{2}) meadow and a priest. In 1066, lordship of the manor of the manor of Sleaford was held by Barthi of Sleaford, being transferred to the Bishop of Lincoln, St Mary’s in 1086.

Neolithic and Bronze Age finds and evidence of a Bronze Age round barrow have been found 1 mile to the north-east. Less than 1 mile to the west of the village is the site of the lost village of Bacton or Boughton, mentioned in 1334, but only indicated by Medieval field patterns.

In the village, just under the west face of the present Howell Hall, is evidence of Medieval settlement: rectilinear raised areas bounded by hollow ways that suggest toft or other buildings, and just further to the west, ridge and furrow field systems.

Ditch earthworks indicate the possible position of the earlier Howell Hall (the extant is 19th-century) which define a non-moated structure with ornamental, wildfowling and fishing use. Later, the demolished Hall may have been used to construct village houses.

On 1 April 1931 the civil parish was abolished to form "Asgarby and Howell".

== Landmarks ==
Howell's Grade II* listed Anglican parish church is dedicated to St Oswald. Originating in the 13th century, and restored in 1870, it includes a chancel, nave, a north aisle, chantry chapel, arcade of three bays, porch, and an Early English double bell-cote.

The doorway to the south is Norman, described by Nikolaus Pevsner as "over-restored". In the chancel is an old altar slab with 5 crosses which Pevsner believes is Anglo-Saxon – on the south side of which is a low sill serving for a sedilia, and on the north, double projecting aumbries. The Decorated Gothic octagonal font, bearing Hebden, Rye, and Luttrell shields, was given to the church by Richard de Hebden (died 1373).

In the chancel are several inscribed commemorative stones, the oldest of which is to Sir Nicholas de Hebden (died 1416), and his wife Katherine (died 1447). There also an incised slab and effigy to John Croxby, a 15th-century rector. In the chantry chapel is a 14th-century tomb with the busts of a lady and child, and a Jacobean monument to Sir Charles Dimok (or Dymok) of Howell, MP for the City of London (died 1602), and his wife Margaret (Butler). In the nave is a slab to Richard Boteler (died 1457), and his wife, Matilda (died 1456).

In the churchyard are the listed remains of a cross inscribed to the memory of John Spenser, rector, 1424–1448. Since Cox recorded the Spenser cross in 1916, the inscription has become undecipherable.

The church, with those of Asgarby and South Kyme, is in the Heckington Group of churches.

Howell's two further listed buildings are a late 17th-century rectory, and early 18th-century Howell Hall.
