= Asgarby and Howell =

Civil parish in Lincolnshire, England

Coordinates: 53.00°N 0.32°W

Asgarby and Howell is a civil parish in the North Kesteven district of Lincolnshire, England, consisting of the villages of Asgarby and Howell. According to the 2001 Census, the parish had a population of 69.

The parish church, St Oswald's, dates back to the 14th century.

In 1870–1872, John Marius described Asgarby and Howell as:

Asgarby, a parish in Sleaford district, Lincoln; adjacent to the Boston and Grantham railway, 3 miles E of Sleaford. It includes the hamlet of Boughton; and its Post Town is Sleaford.
