= English church monuments =

Memorials in Christian churches in the UK

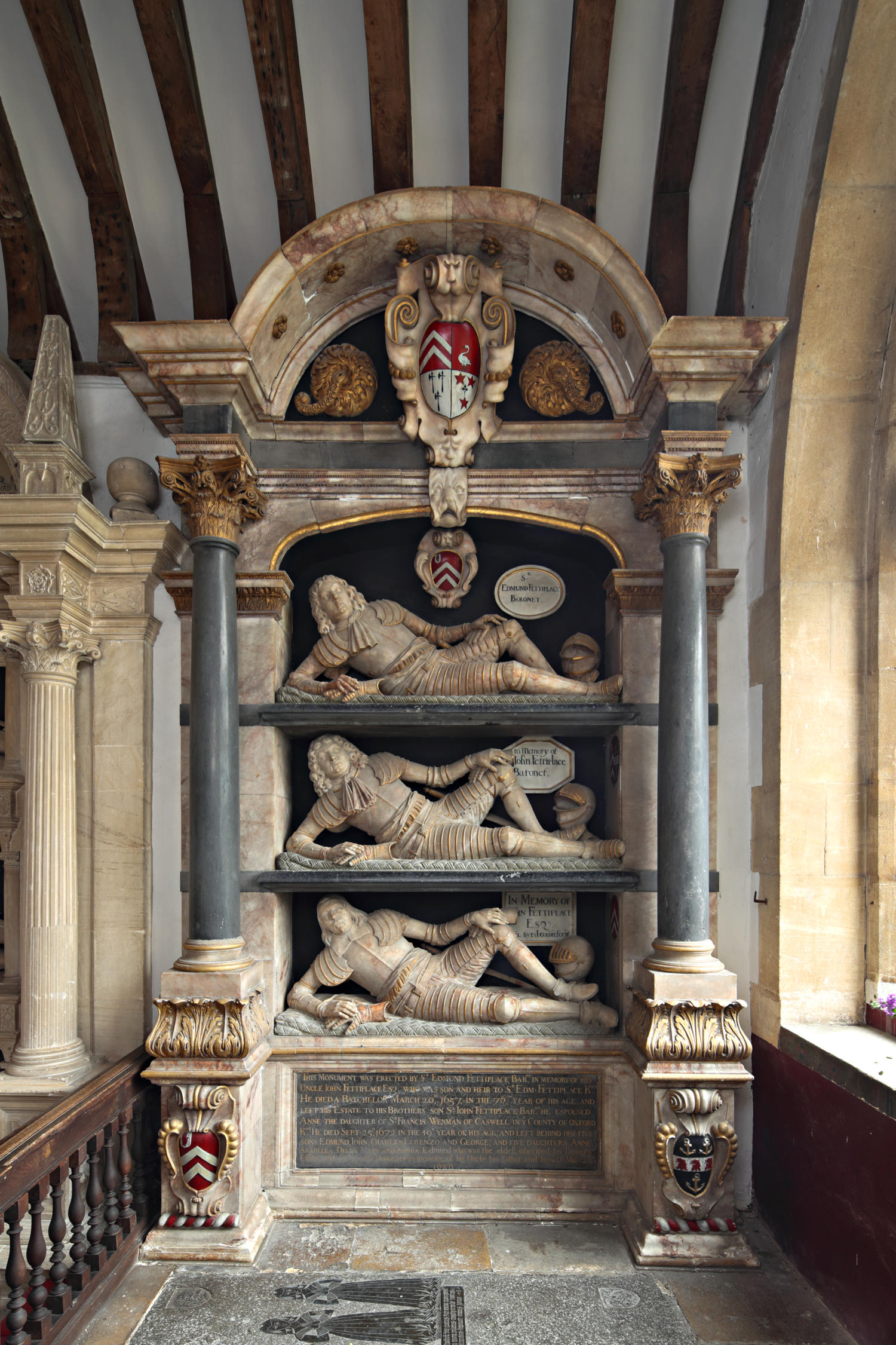
A typical late-17th century English funerary monument. This example, at Swinbrook, Oxfordshire, is to the Fettiplace family.

A church monument is an architectural or sculptural memorial to a deceased person or persons, located within a Christian church. It can take various forms ranging from a simple commemorative plaque or mural tablet affixed to a wall, to a large and elaborate structure, on the ground or as a mural monument, which may include an effigy of the deceased person and other figures of familial, heraldic or symbolic nature. It is usually placed immediately above or close to the actual burial vault or grave, although very occasionally the tomb is constructed within it. Sometimes the monument is a cenotaph, commemorating a person buried at another location.

While the terms 'tomb' and 'monument' are frequently used interchangeably when referring to commemorative sculptures, they have distinct meanings: a tomb serves as a burial place containing bodily remains, whereas a monument functions as a memorial structure. Many people incorrectly assume that elaborate tomb chests house the deceased's remains, when typically the actual burials lie in underground vaults beneath the church floor, with the visible structures serving purely commemorative purposes.

Once only the subject of antiquarian curiosity, church monuments are today recognised as works of funerary art. They are also valued by historians as giving a highly detailed record of antique costume and armour, by genealogists as a permanent and contemporary record of familial relationships and dates, and by students of heraldry as providing reliable depictions for heraldic blazons. From the middle of the 15th century, many figurative monuments started to represent genuine portraiture where before had existed only generalised representations.

== Development ==
=== Medieval period ===
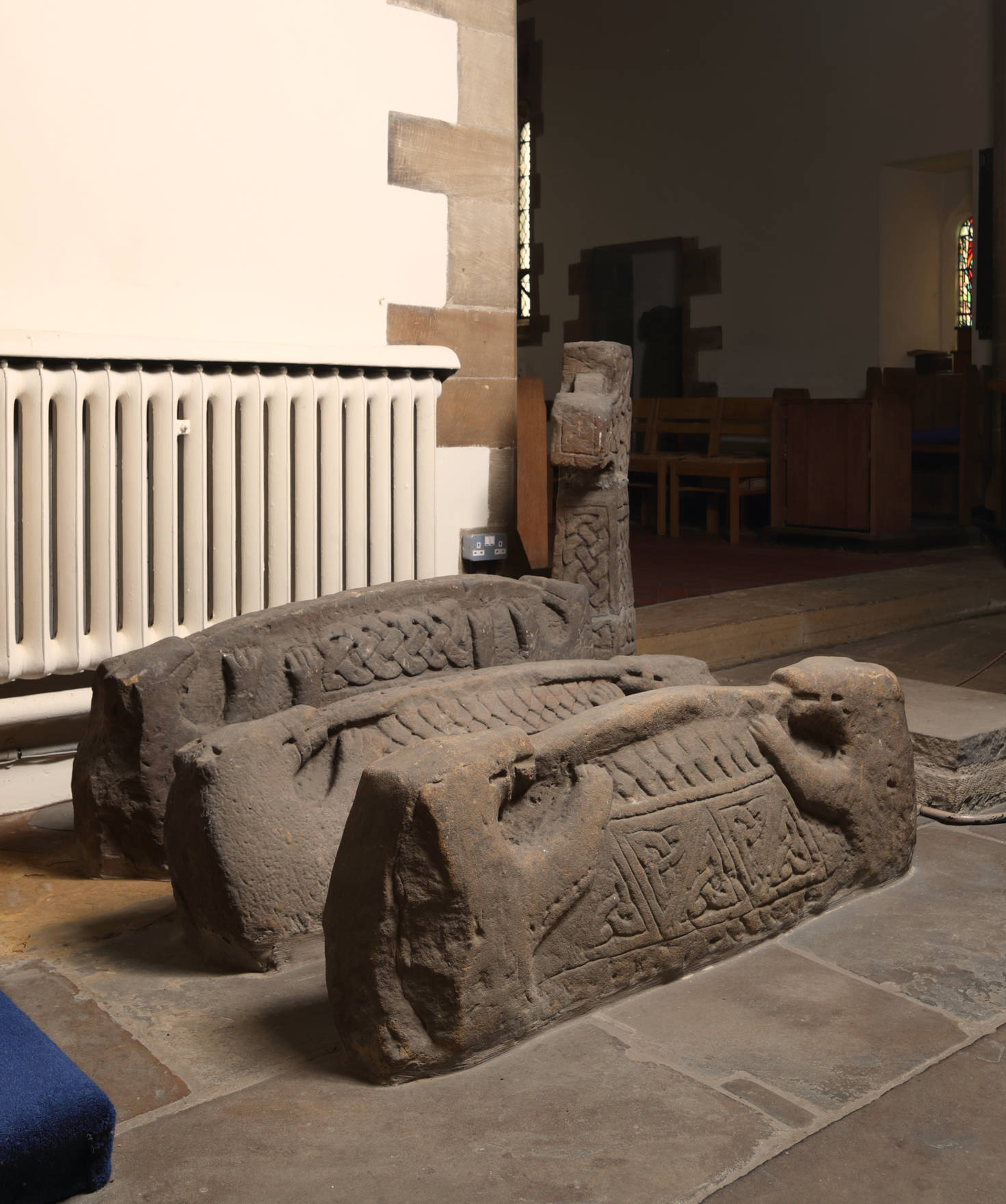
Three hogback tombs dating from the 10th century at Brompton-in-Allertonshire, Yorkshire.

The earliest English Christian funerary monuments appeared during the seventh and eighth centuries, though few examples survive from this period. Most were external grave markers, although evidence suggests some were placed inside churches. Before the tenth century, distinctive 'hogback' monuments had emerged, particularly in northern England where Scandinavians had settled. These monuments, resembling Viking longhouses in shape, likely commemorated individual burials and featured decorative elements including geometric patterns, interlacing designs, and representations of roof tiles. Some examples included carved end beasts such as muzzled bears.

Simple grave markers featuring carved crosses became common from the tenth century onwards, with production continuing for several centuries. By the mid-eleventh century, demand grew for burial within church buildings rather than in external churchyards. This practice, initially resisted by church authorities, became increasingly popular due to pressure from elite families seeking privileged burial locations and the belief that proximity to the altar would enhance spiritual intercession.

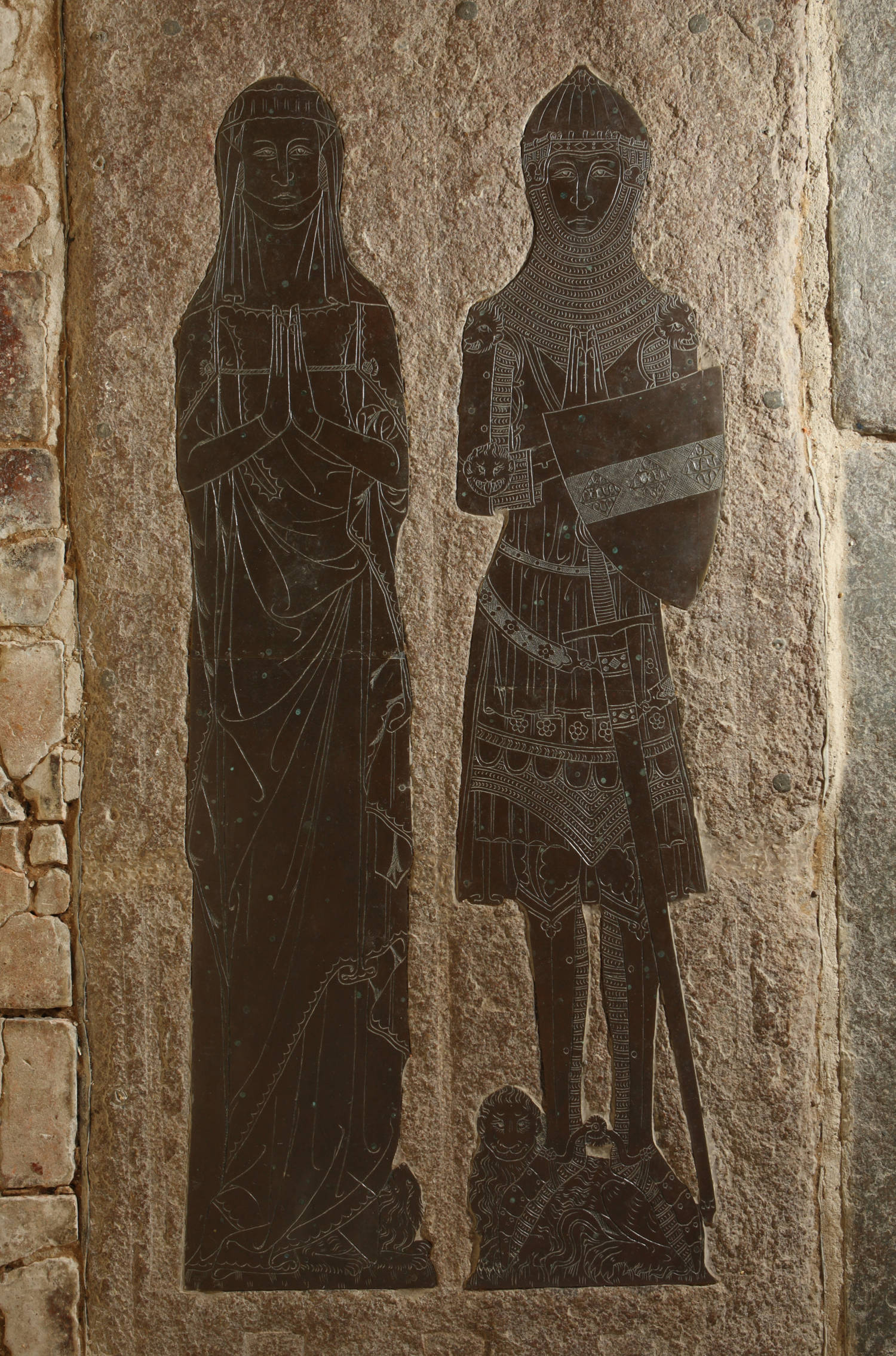
The monumental brass commemorating Sir John and Lady de Creke, c.1340, in St Mary's church, Westley Waterless, Cambridgeshire.

The growing popularity of high-status burials within churches led to more elaborate commemorative monuments during the twelfth and thirteenth centuries. Decorative carving became more sophisticated, with the emergence of incised and low-relief representations of the deceased. During the thirteenth century, effigies began evolving from simple incised figures into more three-dimensional forms raised above their stone slabs. Military figures started appearing in monumental art, and the fashion developed for depicting armoured effigies with crossed legs - a stylistic choice that demonstrated sculptural skill rather than indicating participation in the Crusades, contrary to popular belief.

From the mid-thirteenth century, monumental brasses began appearing, featuring engraved metal plates (actually latten, an alloy of copper, zinc and tin) set into stone slabs. English workshops initially incorporated small brass elements into traditional incised slabs, but by the early fourteenth century, entire figures were being rendered in brass. The finest examples were often set in polished limestone slabs and represented significant artistic achievements.

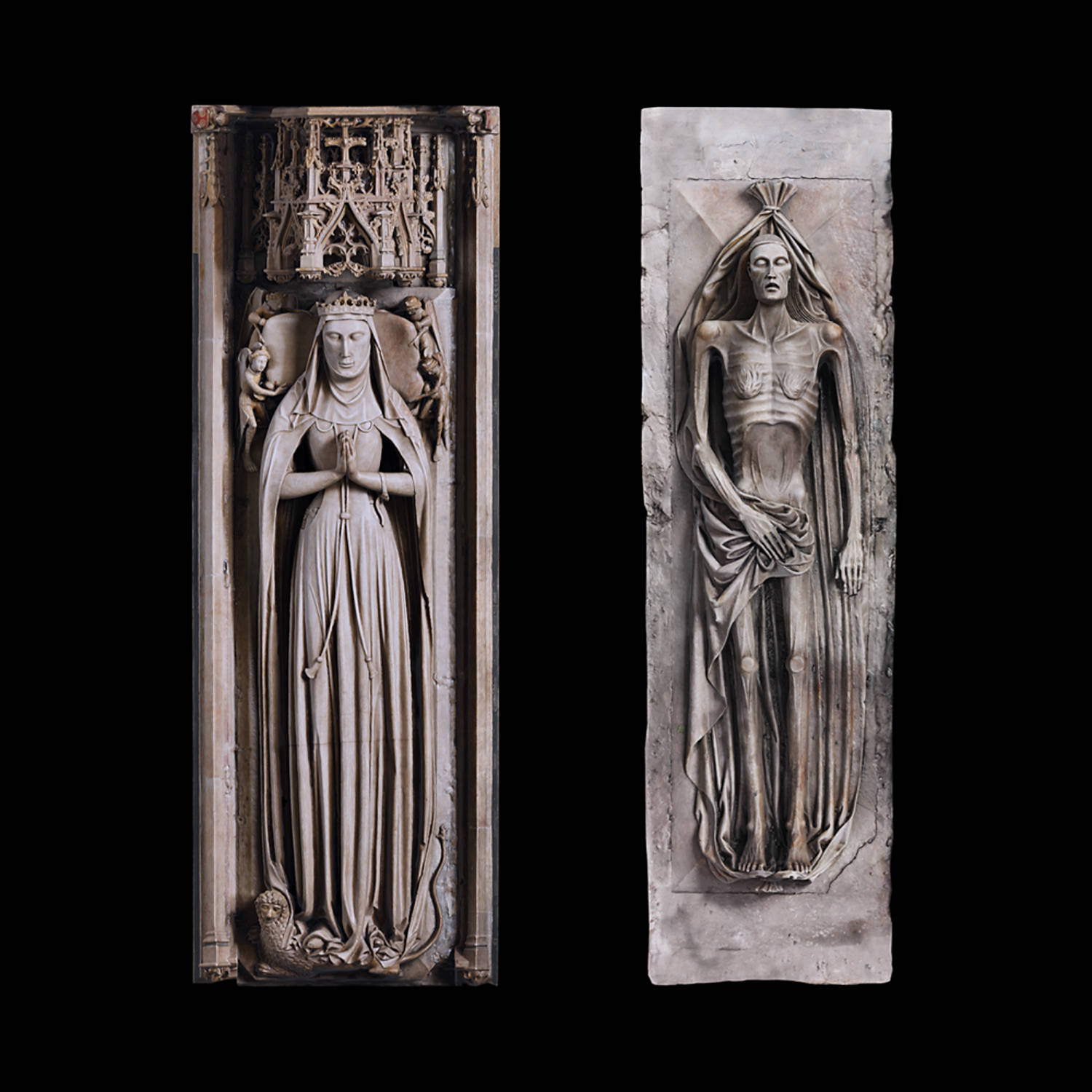
The alabaster upper effigy and lower, cadaver effigy of Alice Chaucer, Duchess of Suffolk (d.1475), Ewelme, Oxfordshire.

Alabaster became increasingly popular for monument construction, particularly after 1370. This soft stone allowed for fine detailed carving when freshly quarried and appealed to medieval patrons for its translucent qualities. Workshops, primarily located in the Midlands near alabaster quarries, produced not only monuments but various religious objects. The use of alabaster declined significantly by the seventeenth century due to the Reformation's impact on religious imagery demand and the depletion of high-quality stone deposits.

During the fifteenth century, a distinctive form of monument developed depicting the deceased as an emaciated or decaying corpse wrapped in a burial shroud, or as a skeleton. These cadaver effigies, known as transi tombs (from the Latin transire meaning 'to cross over' and the Old French transir meaning 'to pass'), generally showed the corpse in the early stages of decomposition with the shroud parted to expose the body. Examples exist both as brasses and sculptural monuments. A more elaborate variant, termed 'double-decker' monuments, displayed the deceased with both conventional and cadaver effigies, typically with the living representation above a tomb chest and the decomposing figure beneath. A fine example in alabaster, the only cadaver effigy existing in this material in England, can be found at Ewelme, Oxfordshire. These memento mori monuments fell from favour after the Reformation, though they continued to appear occasionally into the seventeenth century, particularly among recusant Catholic families.

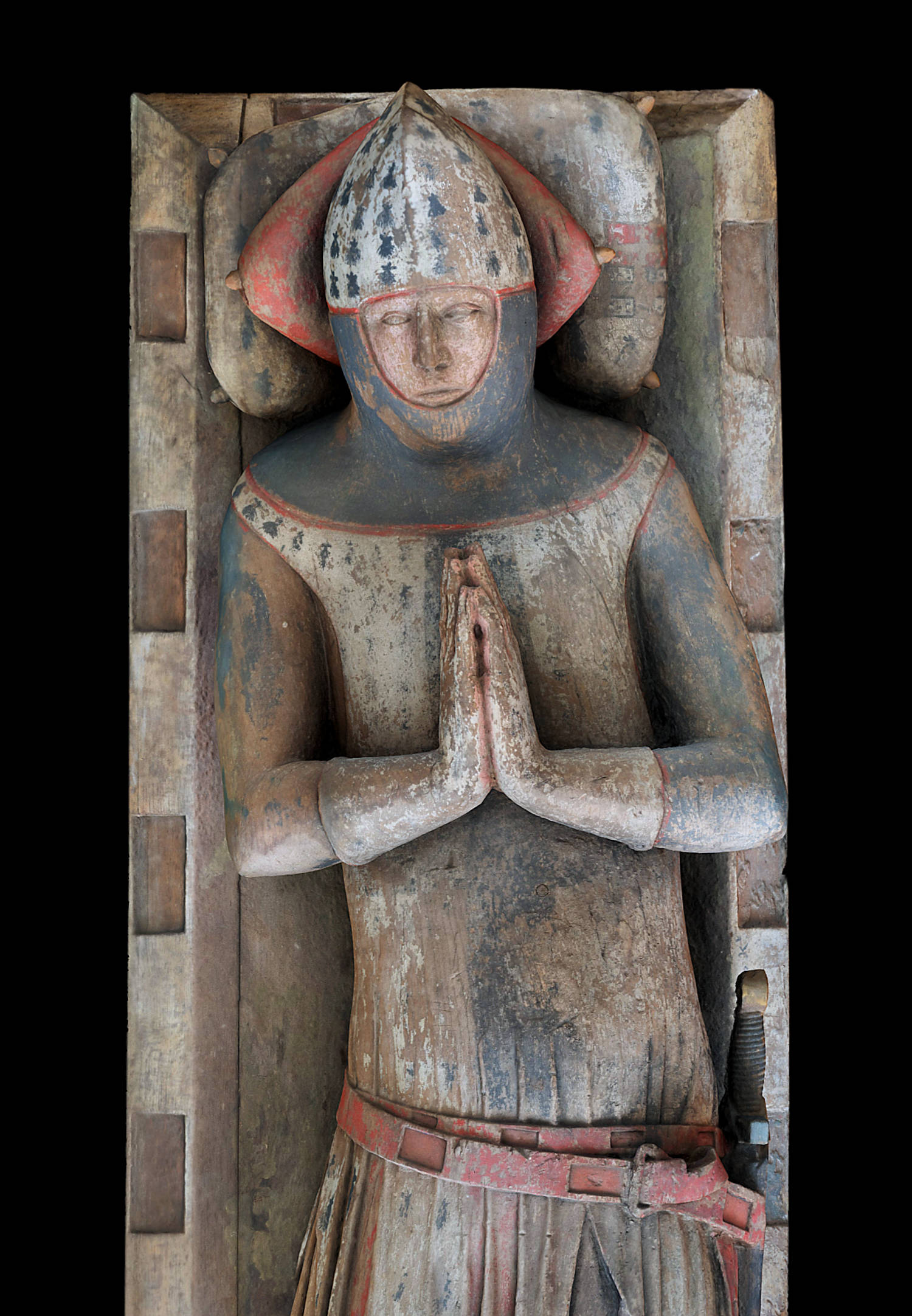
The oak effigy with original polychromy of Sir Robert du Bois (d.1333) at St Mary's Fersfield, Norfolk.

Medieval monuments were originally richly decorated with paint and gilding to enhance their visual impact, though most surface decoration has since disappeared. Alternative materials included limestone, sandstone, and wood (particularly oak), with extensive use of colour to bring effigies to life. Feet were often supported by stylised animals, commonly lions for male figures and small dogs for women, though heraldic beasts from the deceased's family coat of arms also appeared.

=== Tudor period ===
Renaissance artistic influences, originating in Italy during the fifteenth century, first reached England in the early sixteenth century through travelling craftsmen. In the 1510s, the Italian sculptor Pietro Torrigiani was commissioned to create monuments for Henry VII and his mother Lady Margaret Beaufort at Westminster Abbey, introducing Renaissance elements to English monumental art. However, this initial adoption was tentative and did not immediately transform monument design across the country.

The first broader application of Renaissance forms occurred around 1520 when Henry Marney employed foreign craftsmen at Layer Marney in Essex, decorating both his house and nearby church monument with terracotta Renaissance details. This was part of a small group of terracotta monuments in East Anglia that represented early experiments with the new style.

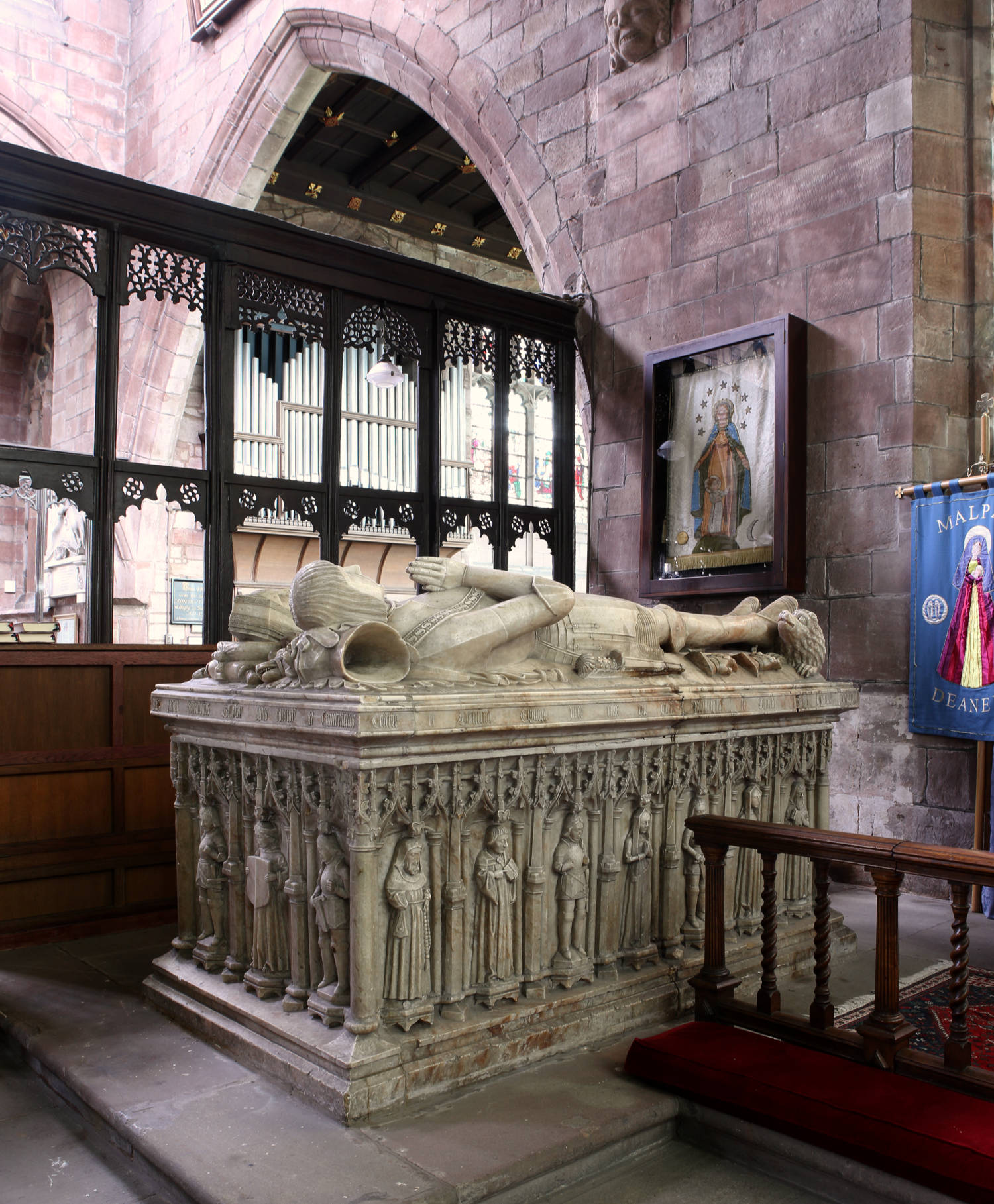
Monument to Sir Randal Brereton (d.1522) and his wife, St Oswald's, Malpas, Cheshire. A superb example of an alabaster Tudor tomb chest with effigies.

More widespread adoption of Renaissance decoration began in the 1530s, though the basic structure of monuments remained largely unchanged from Gothic predecessors. Renaissance ornamental elements such as candelabra, wreaths, pilasters, twisted columns and roundels became increasingly common. These decorative innovations can be seen enriching otherwise traditional monument forms, with Renaissance details applied to conventional tomb chests and effigies.

Henry VIII's break with Rome, formalized in the Act of Supremacy of 1534, significantly impacted both monument design and church decoration. The abolition of chantries through acts of Parliament – the Dissolution of Colleges Act 1545 and the Dissolution of Colleges Act 1547 – combined with the elimination of the Doctrine of Intercession, meant that saintly imagery disappeared from new monuments. Religious hostility led to the removal or defacement of existing religious imagery, particularly during Edward VI's reign. The whitewashing of church walls, previously covered with religious paintings, created additional space for wall-mounted monuments, making this form of commemoration more popular.

The Reformation also resulted in the departure of Italian sculptors from the English court, taking with them advanced techniques such as bronze casting that would not return to England until the second quarter of the seventeenth century. Monumental brass production, which had already begun to decline during the fifteenth century and stagnated around the turn of the sixteenth century, was further affected during the Reformation as many existing brasses were destroyed, particularly in monastic churches. This destruction likely discouraged both patrons and craftsmen from producing new brasses. By 1550 there was improvement in design, but the metal used was of far lesser quality due to the establishment of English foundries producing thinner, cheaper sheets that allowed only shallow engraving.

=== Late Tudor and Early Stuart period ===
By the 1550s, monument design began diversifying significantly from Gothic traditions, incorporating classical architecture and Renaissance elements more extensively. Monuments retained traditional forms like tomb chests with recumbent effigies but increasingly featured Corinthian columns, entablatures with Renaissance friezes, and classical decorative motifs. This period saw considerable experimentation with new compositional arrangements as designers explored different approaches to memorial architecture.

The second half of the sixteenth century witnessed the arrival of new artistic styles and techniques from northern Europe, particularly the Netherlands. Craftsmen fleeing religious and political unrest, especially during the Dutch iconoclastic outbreak of 1566-67 and the French Wars of Religion, brought distinctive decorative innovations to England. Notable figures including Garret Johnson, Isaac James, and Maximilian Colt established workshops and trained English apprentices, creating what became known as the Southwark School due to their concentration south of the Thames, where foreign craftsmen were permitted to work outside the restrictive City of London boundaries.

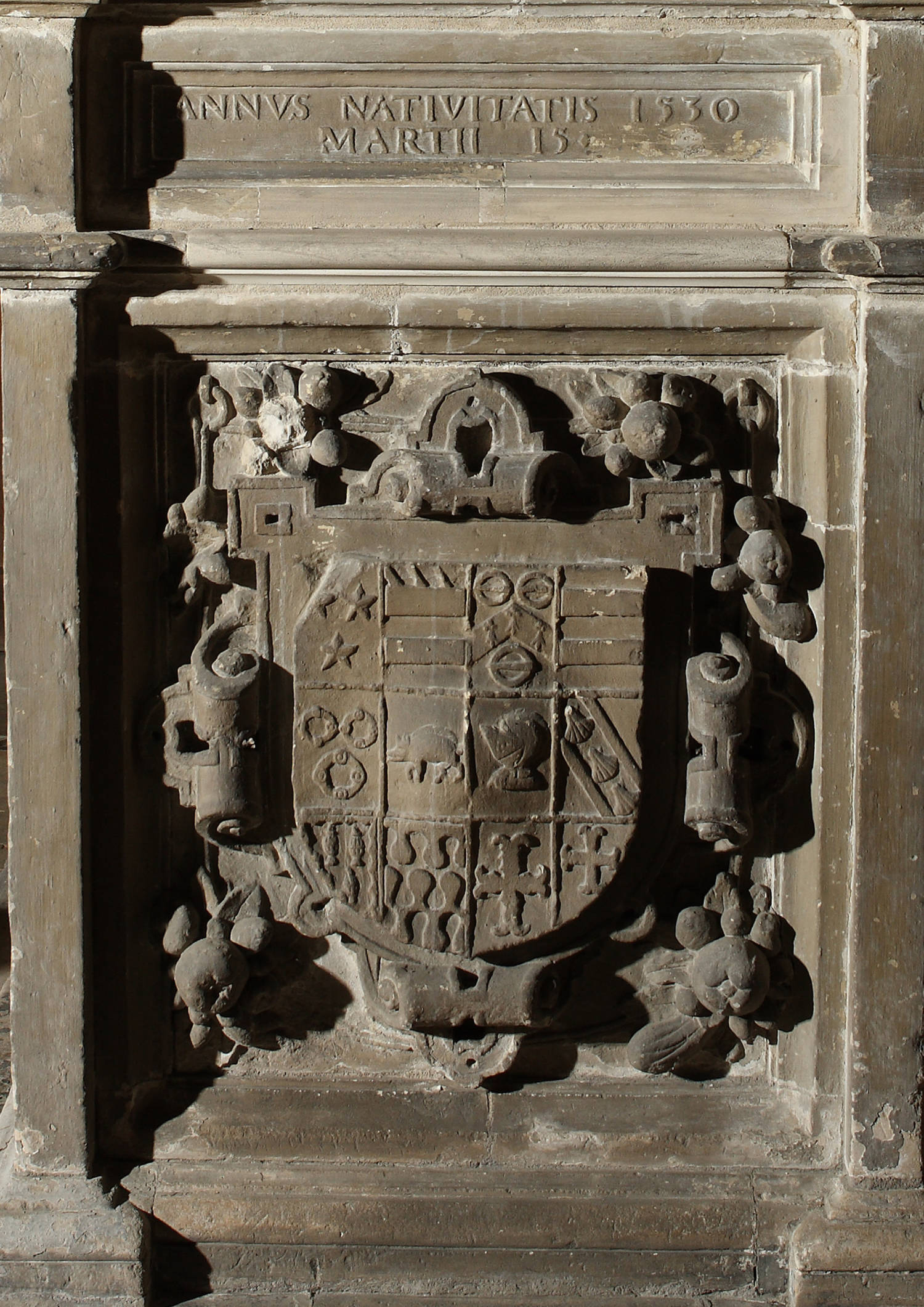
Detail of the tomb chest of the monument to Sir Christopher Hildyard, Winestead, Yorkshire East Riding showing the use of strapwork around the heraldic shield.

These continental artisans introduced several characteristic decorative elements that became hallmarks of late Tudor and early Stuart monuments. Strapwork, resembling ornamental interlaced leather straps or fretwork, became widely popular for surrounding heraldic shields and decorating various monument surfaces. Ribbonwork, representing wavy, crinkled ribbon forms, added movement and texture to designs. Obelisks, serving both decorative and symbolic functions representing eternity, were incorporated into canopy tops and monument corners.

The Southwark School revolutionized English monument production by incorporating coloured stones and marbles into their designs, combined with extensive use of paint and gilding to create visually striking memorials that clearly appealed to wealthy patrons. The primary materials included English alabaster alongside imported touch (black marble) and rance (red marble) from continental sources. This colourful, highly decorative style was widely imitated by provincial workshops throughout England.

However, during the final third of the sixteenth century, monument quality generally declined, particularly in provincial workshop output. This deterioration was exemplified by workshops such as that of Richard and Gabriel Royley in Burton upon Trent, whose production showed marked decline between 1540 and 1590. Renaissance decorative elements were often misinterpreted or simplified, and effigies became increasingly stylized. This decline reflected Protestant England's cultural isolation from Catholic European centres of artistic innovation, reducing the influx of new ideas and techniques that might have refreshed local traditions.

=== Seventeenth century ===
The early seventeenth century was dominated by the final generation of refugee sculptors, notably Maximilian Colt, who arrived in England and quickly gained royal patronage. By 1605, Colt had secured prestigious commissions including monuments to Elizabeth I and the infant daughters of James I at Westminster Abbey. His most innovative work was the monument to Robert Cecil, Earl of Salisbury, at Hatfield, featuring simple black and white marble design that contrasted sharply with the elaborate, colourful monuments typical of Southwark workshops. However, this restrained approach did not gain widespread popularity, and Colt reverted to more traditional forms in subsequent works.

During the first two decades of the century, apprentices from the Southwark workshops established their own practices, developing new directions while building upon traditional Southwark forms. Among the most successful was Epiphanius Evesham, whose work broke free from conventional formality to imbue sculpture with remarkable emotional depth. His monuments departed from typical rigid poses, showing figures in more naturalistic attitudes and incorporating touching scenes such as grieving family members and charming relief carvings of children.

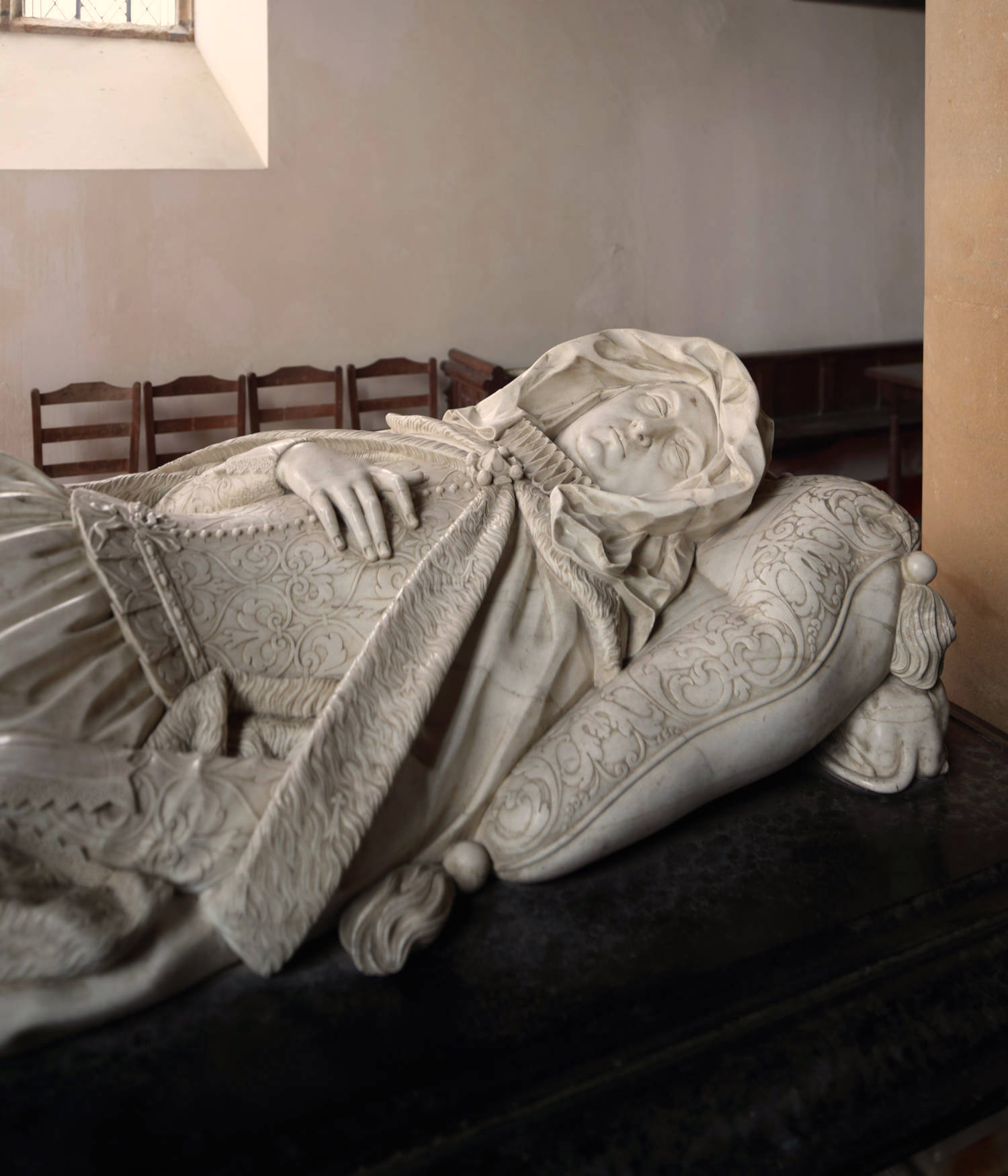
The effigy on the monument to Lady Carey (d.1630) at Stowe-Nine-Churches, Northamptonshire. This naturalistic effigy was made in her lifetime (1620) by Nicholas Stone and shows her as an elderly woman.

Perhaps the greatest English sculptor of the early seventeenth century was Nicholas Stone, who trained under Isaac James and worked with Hendrick de Keyser in Amsterdam before establishing a Westminster workshop in 1613. Stone's practice produced both traditional and innovative designs, achieving rapid success and recognition. Some of his work was a significant departure from earlier monuments in both materials and design approach. His effigies became much more relaxed and naturalistic, often featuring true rather than generic portraiture. His monument to Elizabeth, Lady Carey at Stowe-Nine-Churches, with its superb attention to detail, exemplifies his work's great beauty and charm and has been hailed as one of the greatest works of its era, considered by some to be Stone's masterpiece.

During the 1620s, resurrection monuments gained popularity, depicting the deceased in burial shrouds but rising from their graves on Judgment Day rather than showing decay. These monuments showed figures reclining or standing while wrapped in shrouds, often accompanied by angels sounding trumpets or other symbols of resurrection. Stone's monument to John Donne at St Paul's Cathedral helped establish this fashion, showing the poet wrapped in a shroud while standing on an urn representing the grave from which he rises.

The new generation of sculptors introduced significant material and stylistic changes. Imported marble began replacing alabaster as the preferred medium, partly due to the depletion of high-quality English alabaster deposits. Effigies became more relaxed and individualized, often featuring genuine portraiture rather than generic representations. Monument design drew increasing influence from Continental engraved title pages and treatises, while ancient Roman sculpture began affecting English work through publications and the court's collecting activities. Inigo Jones, as court architect, both designed monuments himself and influenced other designers, particularly Nicholas Stone.

Monuments became increasingly personal, expressing the deceased's interests and sometimes illustrating their professional activities through biographical vignettes. The use of carved stone curtains became fashionable, influenced by elaborate funeral hearses and catafalques, typically shown tied back to side columns. Allegorical figures, particularly representations of the classical Virtues, became important elements in monument design, either standing independently or incorporated into larger compositions. Paint was used more sparingly than in previous periods, usually confined to gilding certain details and colouring heraldic elements.

The Civil War significantly reduced monument production to approximately half the previous decade's output, a level maintained during the Commonwealth period, though designs tended toward greater conservatism. Following the Restoration in 1660, new designs flourished with the introduction of baroque style, becoming more exuberant and theatrical. This inventiveness continued through the late seventeenth and early eighteenth centuries. Effigies became increasingly animated and dramatic, while decoration incorporated natural subjects including fruit and flowers, partly influenced by the limewood carvings of Grinling Gibbons. The traditional tomb chest with recumbent effigies largely disappeared during this period and would not return to favour until the nineteenth century.

=== Georgian period ===
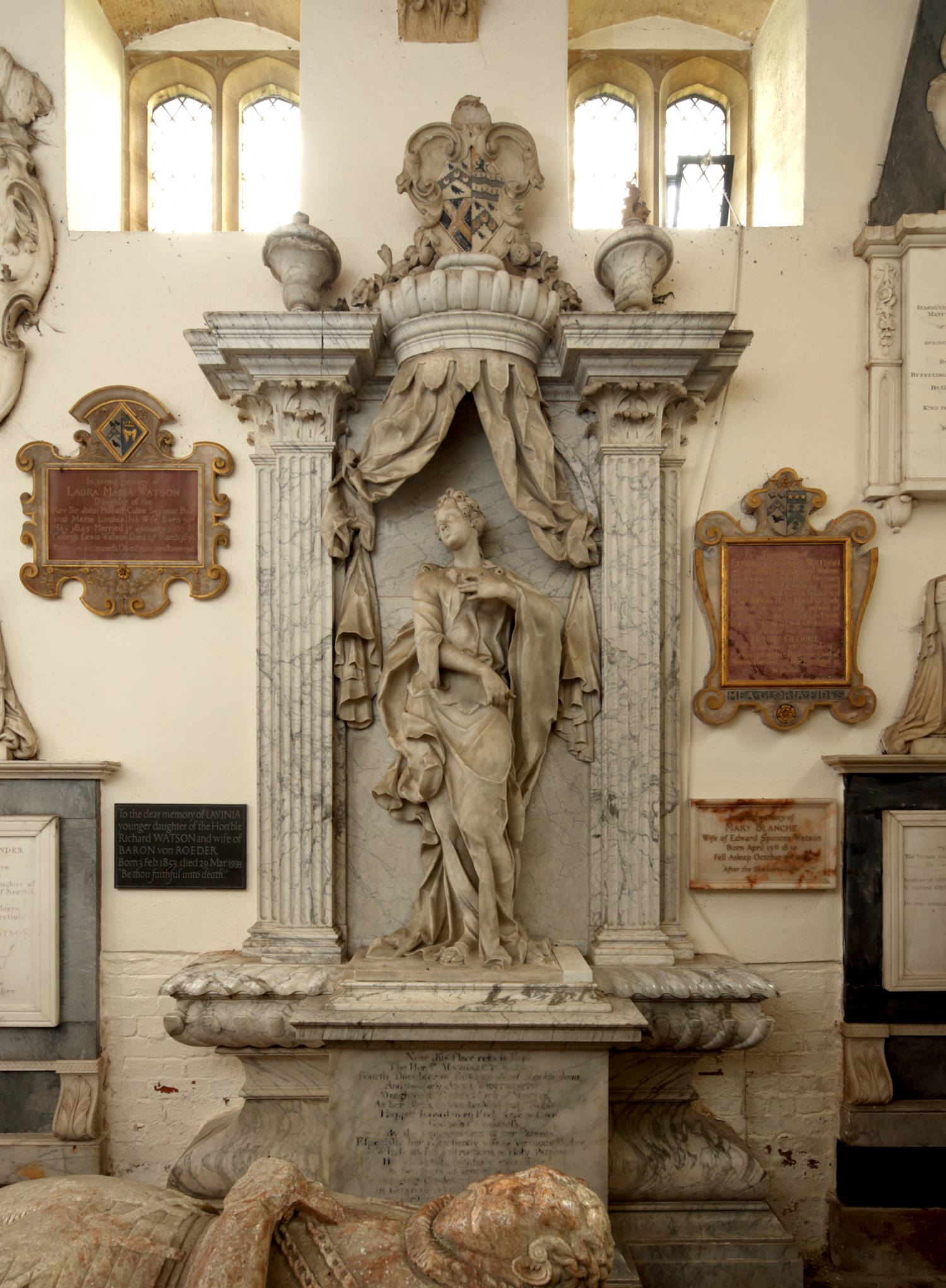
Monument to the Hon. Margaret Watson (d.1713) by William Palmer, Rockingham, Northamptonshire.

Throughout the eighteenth century, monuments became increasingly diverse and were heavily influenced by classical antiquities imported from Italy. The fashion for portrait busts, which had first emerged in the early seventeenth century, gained significant momentum under a new generation of sculptors led by John Michael Rysbrack, Louis-François Roubiliac, and later Joseph Nollekens. These busts often followed the style of Roman funeral monuments, with images of Roman worthies becoming popular decorations for country house interiors, particularly libraries, where they were frequently made from inexpensive materials like plaster.

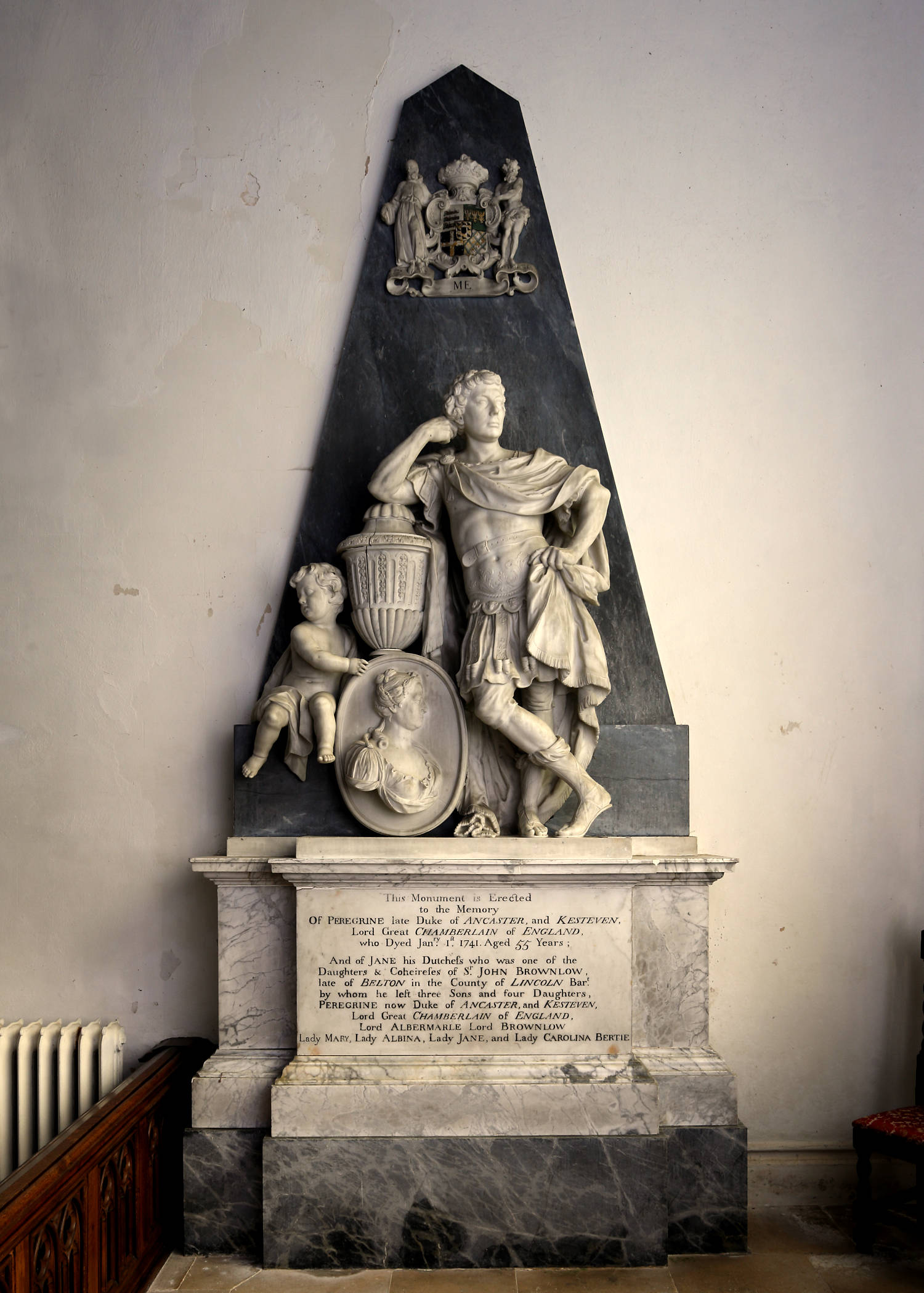
Monument to the 2nd Duke of Ancaster (d.1741), who is shown as a Roman military commander. An obelisk forms the backdrop. Edenham, Lincolnshire.

This classical influence extended to full monuments, with prominent English figures depicted as Roman citizens or military commanders. There was a prevailing sentiment that England, with its monarch whose powers were limited by Parliament, paralleled the Republican period of ancient Rome. Figures in Roman attire became a common feature of eighteenth-century monuments, reflecting this cultural identification with classical antiquity.

Georgian monuments took various forms but can generally be grouped into several categories: wall-mounted designs, floor-standing monuments placed against walls, and less commonly, completely detached monuments on tomb chests or pedestals. While monuments featuring only the deceased continued to be produced, it became fashionable to include multiple figures arranged in grand theatrical compositions. These elaborate scenes often drew upon family traditions or symbolic narratives, creating some of the most dramatic memorial tableaux in English art.

Many designs incorporated a pyramid-cum-obelisk as a backdrop, giving monuments distinctive silhouettes. The pyramid form, originating in ancient Egypt and familiar to educated audiences through Renaissance book illustrations, had been extensively used in Italy before spreading to France and appearing in England from the early eighteenth century. In English usage, pyramids were typically given tapered tops resembling obelisks, combining two symbols of eternity that had entered the monumental vocabulary at different periods. These pyramidal backgrounds could be used with architectural settings but were more often employed independently, rising behind standing or reclining figures on tomb chests or sarcophagi.

The mid-eighteenth century witnessed the arrival of the rococo style from France, characterized by light-hearted theatricality based on balanced asymmetry and natural forms. This influence particularly affected the work of Roubiliac and Henry Cheere, introducing more playful and dynamic elements to monument design.

Allegorical figures became ever more popular as the century progressed, used either independently or alongside statues of the deceased to signify traditional virtues or the commemorated person's profession. Sometimes a single figure could represent both a family member and an allegorical concept, adding layers of meaning to monument interpretation.

Cherubs, previously used as general decorative elements, assumed more central roles in eighteenth-century compositions. They might garland urns, tie ribbons connecting portrait medallions, or take active parts in symbolic narratives. Angels, often represented as female figures, also became popular toward the century's end, frequently depicted in scenes representing the triumph of life over death.

The pyramid-obelisk form proved particularly long-lasting in monument design, continuing well into the nineteenth century and becoming one of the most enduring elements of Georgian commemorative art.

=== Victorian period ===
Neoclassicism reached its full influence in England by the late eighteenth century and continued strongly into the nineteenth. Prominent early neoclassical sculptors included Thomas Banks, Joseph Nollekens, and John Bacon the Elder, followed by John Flaxman at the century's end. The new century brought the final generation of neoclassicists, including John Bacon the Younger, Sir Francis Chantrey, E. H. Baily, and John Gibson.

A popular early nineteenth-century design was the 'stele', based on ancient Greek memorial slabs characterized by height greater than width and topped with shallow pediments. These monuments typically featured relief figures in Grecian dress beneath inscriptions, with common themes including figures seated or standing beside urns, and angels conducting the deceased to Heaven. White marble became the standard material with minimal use of colour, representing a marked departure from the polychrome traditions of previous centuries.

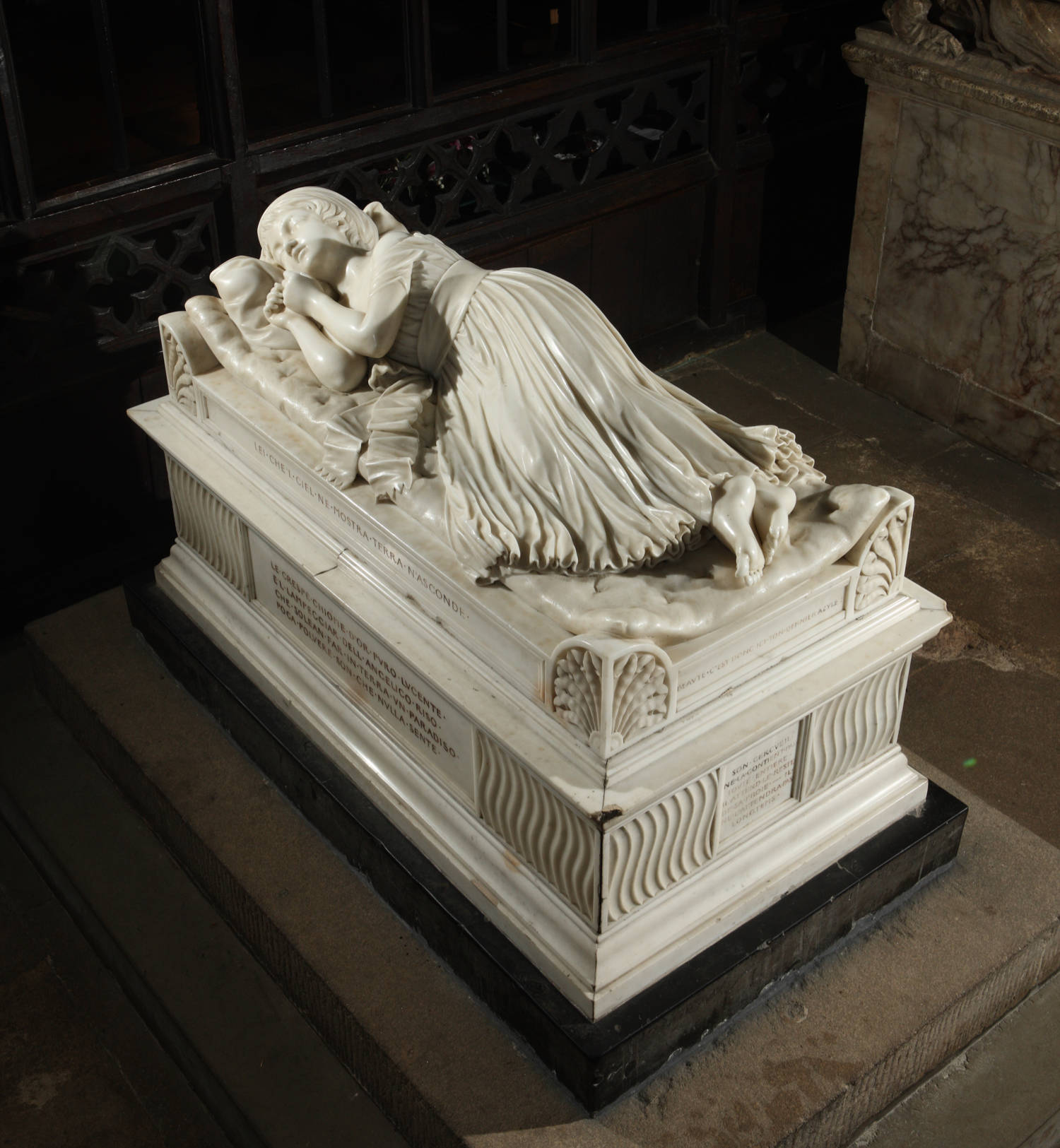
Monument to Penelope Boothby who died in 1791 aged five, by Thomas Banks (1793), Ashbourne, Derbyshire.

Victorian effigies adopted the complete range of postures, including many that had been unfashionable for over a century. Rather than depicting death, recumbent figures were shown sleeping or awake, while reclining effigies were often portrayed reading. This period also saw the prominence of children's monuments, reflecting the Romantic view of children as embodiments of purity and innocence. This fashion was notably initiated in 1793 by Thomas Banks with his sculpture of five-year-old Penelope Boothby at Ashbourne, and such monuments continued well into the nineteenth century.

Although many monuments followed popular forms, unique designs were sometimes employed, demonstrating the creative experimentation that characterized the period. The obelisk-pyramid, previously ubiquitous in Georgian design, became increasingly rare during the early Victorian period.

Gothic Revival emerged as a significant rival to neoclassicism by the mid-eighteenth century. During its early phase, it was inspired by a romantic rather than scholarly view of the Middle Ages, resulting in fanciful interpretations sometimes termed 'Gothick' to distinguish them from later academic accuracy. The gradual replacement of neoclassical forms by Gothic Revival was influenced by increasing tolerance toward Roman Catholicism, culminating in the Catholic Emancipation Act of 1829. This encouraged new church building for Catholic patrons and inspired architects like A. W. N. Pugin, himself a fervent Catholic.

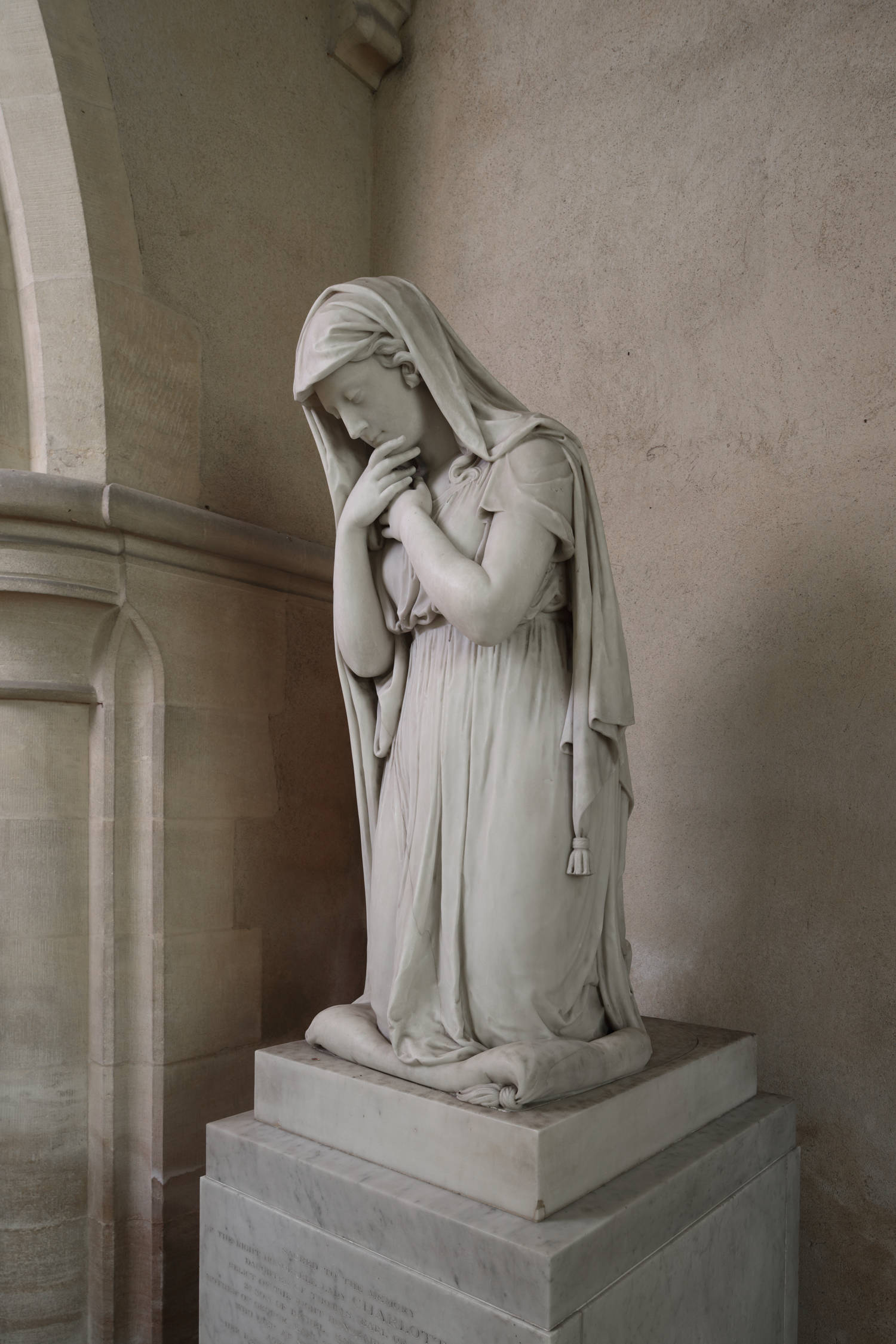
Monument to Lady Charlotte Finch by Sir Francis Chantrey, 1820, Burley-on-the-Hill, Rutland

The Oxford Movement, advocating Anglo-Catholic worship within the Church of England, generated considerable interest in both liturgy and ecclesiastical architecture. Young architects enthusiastically promoted the study and application of medieval architectural principles, leading not only to Gothic-style building construction and church 'restoration' to perceived pure medieval forms, but also influencing monument design.

The recumbent effigy returned strongly to fashion, sometimes accompanied by elaborate canopies stretching to church roofs. Medieval-style representation was revived, with figures lying on their backs with hands in prayer, sometimes with angels supporting pillows in the medieval tradition. However, while there were concerted efforts to recreate medieval monuments accurately, dress typically remained contemporary Victorian fashion. Decoration became generally more austere, sometimes incorporating crosses or Bibles, and angels began assuming much more prominent roles in designs.

Gothic Revival in tomb sculpture was somewhat constrained by academic classicism, which remained the approved style of the Royal Academy throughout the nineteenth century. The Academy maintained rigid distinctions between fine art sculpture exhibited there and the work of mason-sculptors who were subordinate to architects. Academic sculptors like G. F. Watts and Hamo Thornycroft worked in marble and bronze, while their colleagues were often employed by firms such as Farmer & Brindley, who provided complete design services and oversaw monument production.

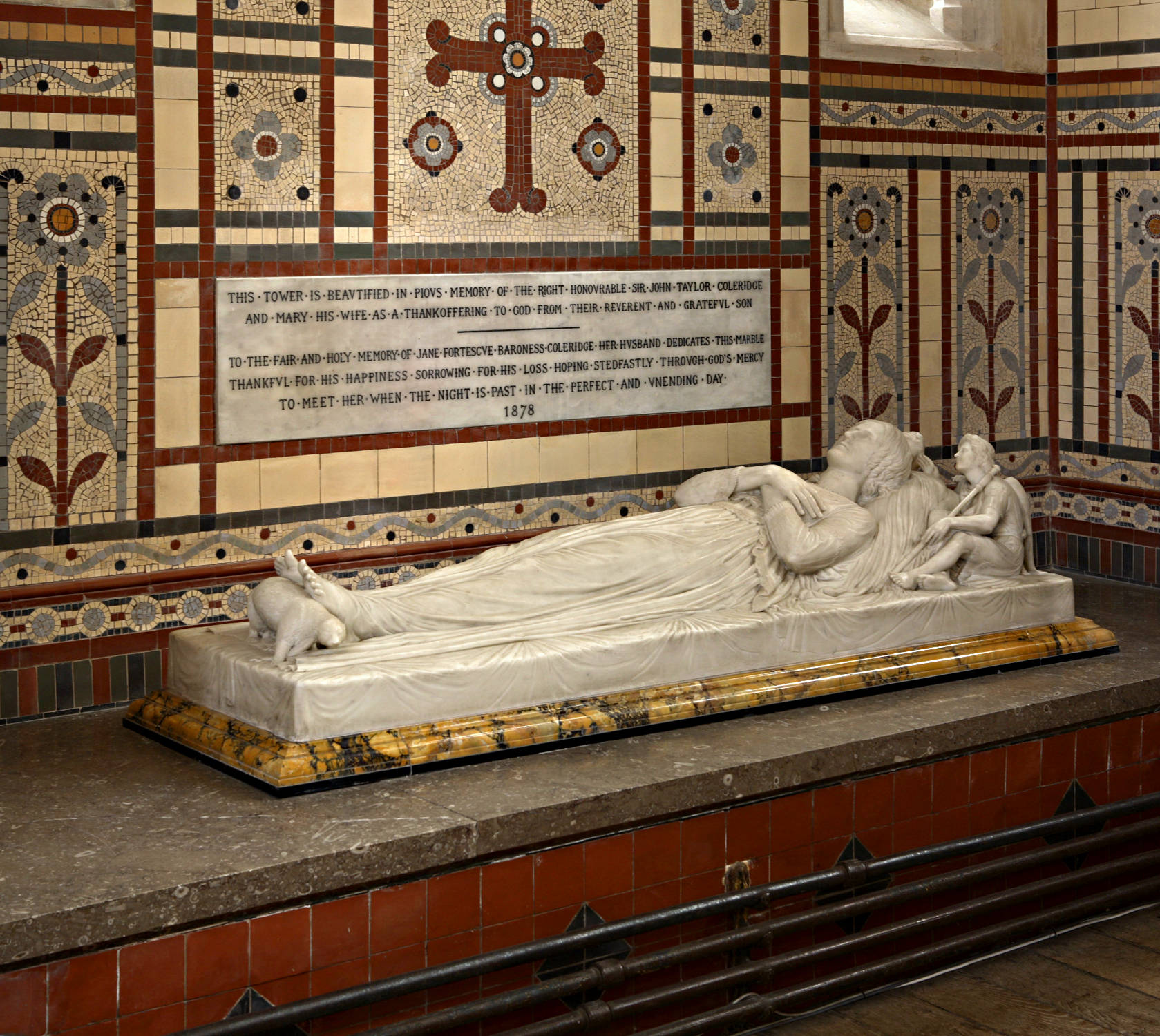
Monument to Baroness Coleridge (d.1879) by Frederick Thorpe, Ottery St Mary, Devon.

Monumental figurative brasses, virtually unknown since the seventeenth century, returned to fashion during the Victorian period through the study of medieval sources. These utilized Gothic canopies but usually depicted the deceased in contemporary clothing. Like their medieval predecessors, brasses were set in floor slabs or on tomb chests. Numerous non-figurative brasses were also produced, typically incorporating Gothic designs or set within Gothic stone frames using black letter script.

Gothic revivalism declined during the final two decades of the nineteenth century. The 1870s saw the emergence of the New Sculpture movement, promoting greater realism, exotic subjects, and symbolism under French influence. This period witnessed a revival in lost-wax bronze casting techniques, significantly improving work quality. Continental art nouveau style and the symbolist movement began influencing monument design in what would be the final decades of major church monuments before the First World War.

Artists such as Sir George Frampton and Sir Alfred Gilbert introduced fresh ideas and new materials, bringing more subtle and aesthetically self-conscious designs. Despite new artistic directions, many people now chose commemoration through simple memorial tablets or, more commonly, stained glass windows and church fittings rather than elaborate sculptural monuments.

The years between the late Victorian period and 1914 represented the sunset era for large church monuments. The First World War marked a decisive change, with the popularity of individual carved and cast funeral monuments eclipsed by demand for collective outdoor war memorials. The decimation of landed gentry families also ended nearly all major monument commissions in parish churches, with post-war individuals most often commemorated through stained glass windows rather than sculpture.

== Contemporary significance ==
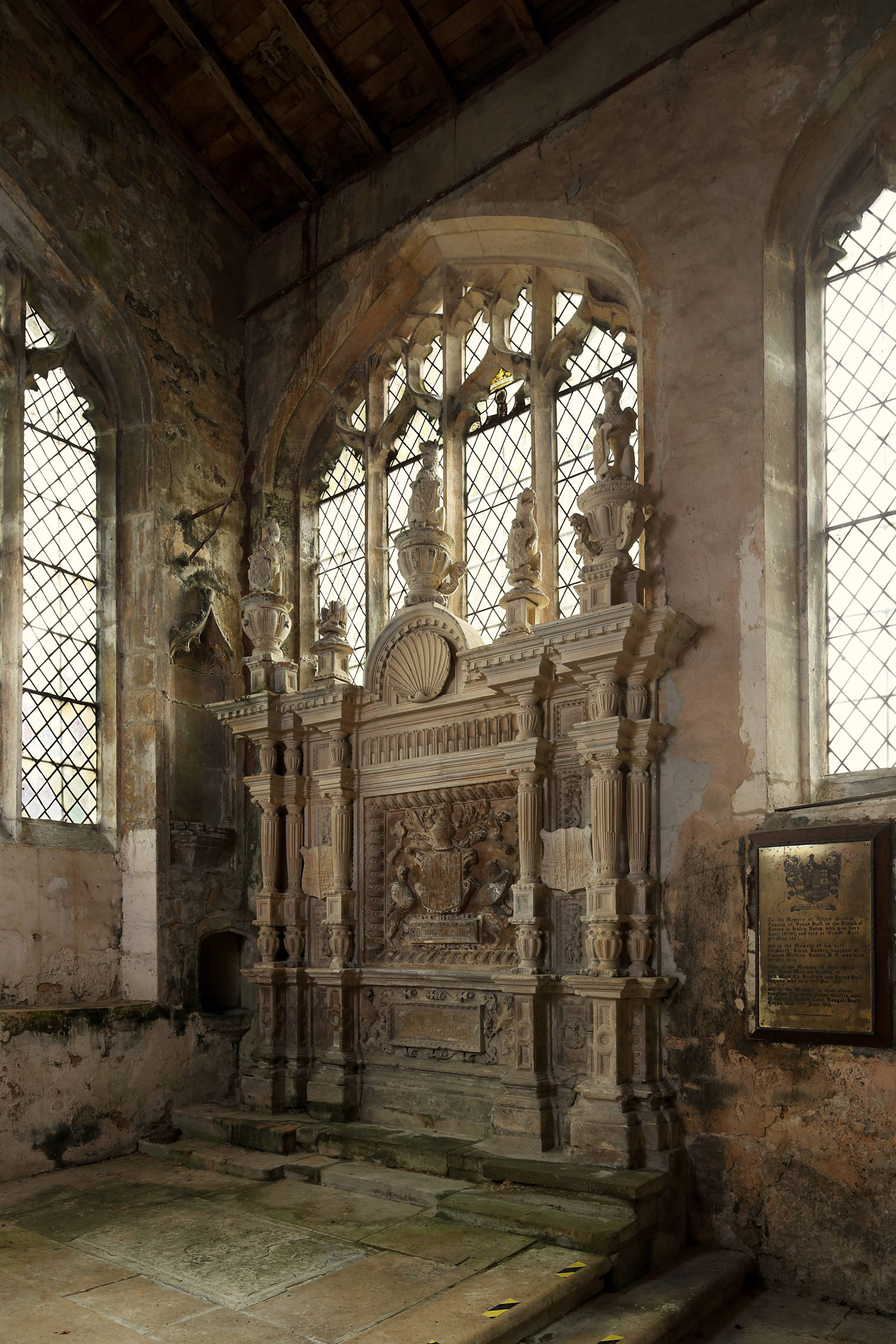
Monument of c.1570 to the Griffin family, Braybrooke, Northants. Ingress of damp and deteriorating conditions have affected this elaborate Renaissance wall monument, demonstrating the challenges facing church monument preservation and highlighting the critical importance of heritage grants and conservation funding to protect England's irreplaceable sculptural heritage.

English parish churches contain more sculpture than all the country's museums and galleries combined. Unlike museum pieces, these monuments remain freely accessible to the public without barriers or entrance fees, typically displayed in their original locations and contexts. This setting provides powerful experiences that illuminate both the artworks and their historical significance.

Most monuments today are in better condition than at any time since their creation, thanks to generous conservation grants, local fundraising efforts, and specialized restoration work. Professional conservation techniques have advanced considerably, allowing for the careful cleaning, consolidation, and protection of fragile sculptural surfaces while preserving their historical authenticity. Church tourism has become increasingly important, bringing income to both churches and their communities while potentially determining whether churches survive as active community centres or face permanent closure.

However, declining congregation numbers and ageing membership place heavy burdens on church maintenance, often leaving ancient buildings vulnerable to structural problems that threaten their contents. Issues such as roof leaks, rising damp, and inadequate heating systems can cause significant damage to monuments over time. The increasing number of church closures raises important questions about preserving monument collections, stained glass, woodwork, and other artistic contents of significant cultural and historical value when buildings become redundant.

These monuments serve as touchstones to the past, whether for studying historical figures, understanding local history, or tracing family genealogies. They provide insights into social history, costume, technology, and artistic development, making their preservation valuable not just for art history but for broader understanding of English cultural development over more than a millennium.

== Examples of English church monuments ==
English church monuments have been preserved in considerable numbers and generally good condition. Fine examples spanning many centuries may be found in cathedrals and parish churches in every county. The selection below demonstrates the variety and quality of monuments found across England.

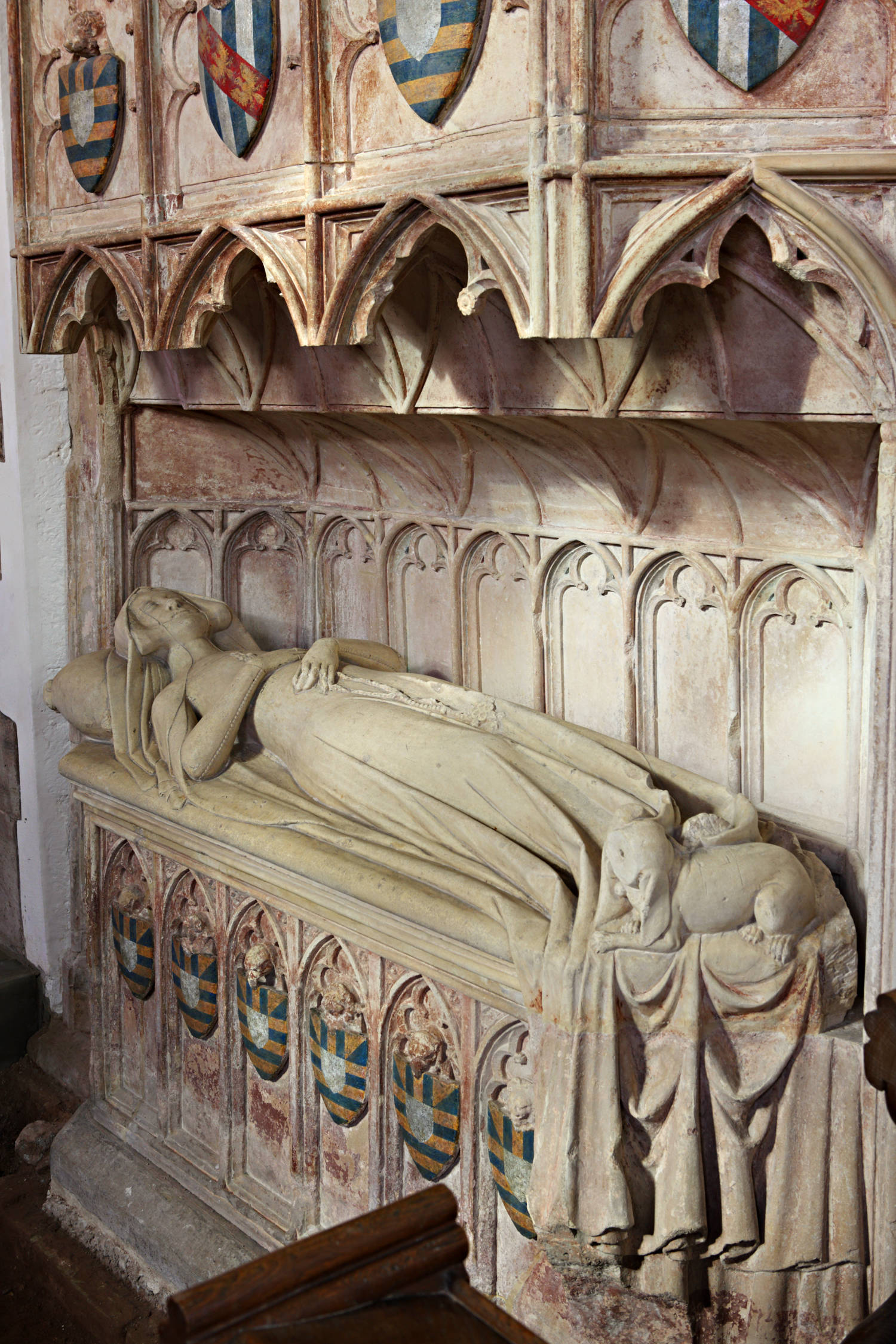
The monument to Blanche Mortimer (d.1347), Much Marcle, Herefordshire. Perhaps the loveliest female effigy in England.

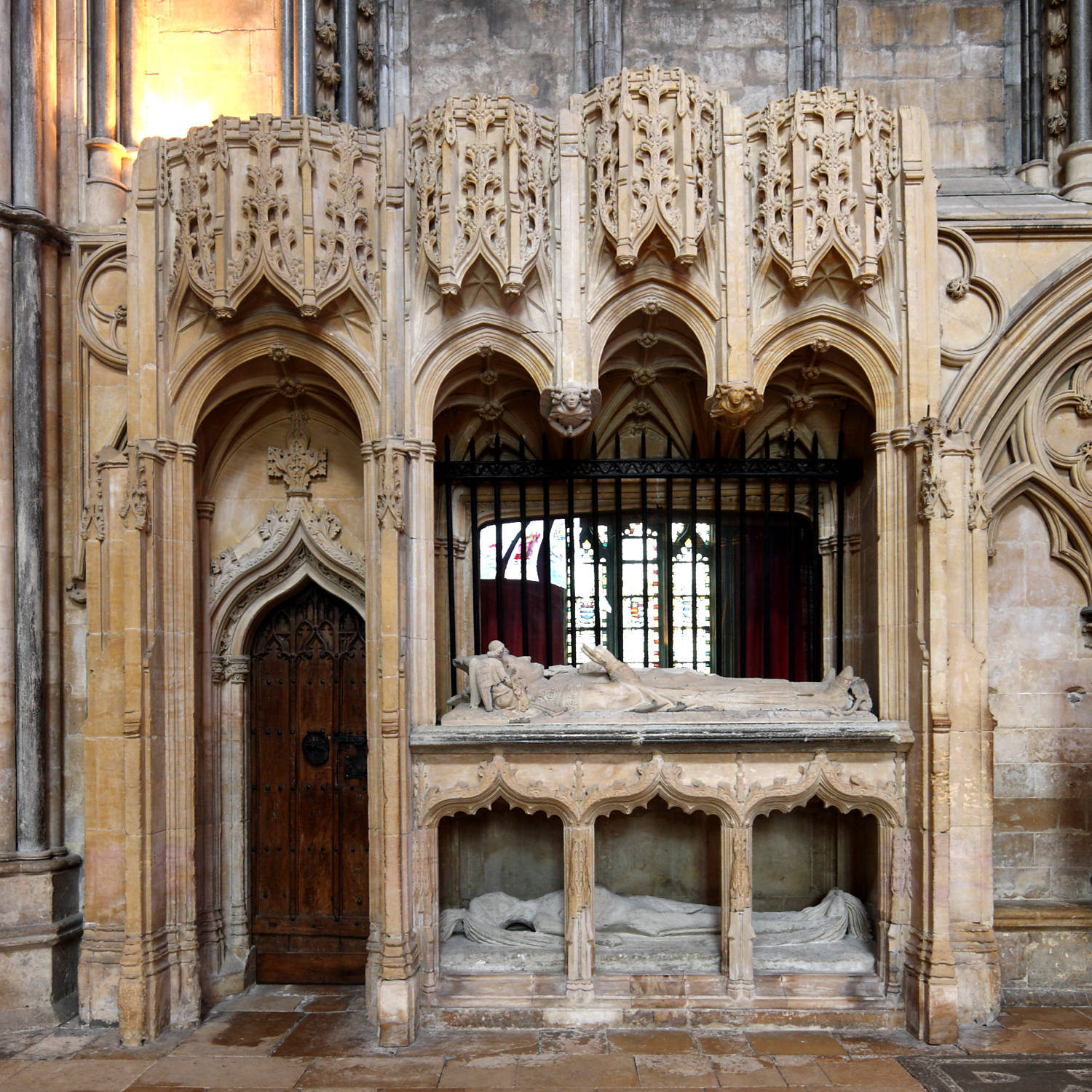
The transi tomb of Bishop Richard Fleming (d.1431) integrated into his chantry chapel, Lincoln Cathedral.

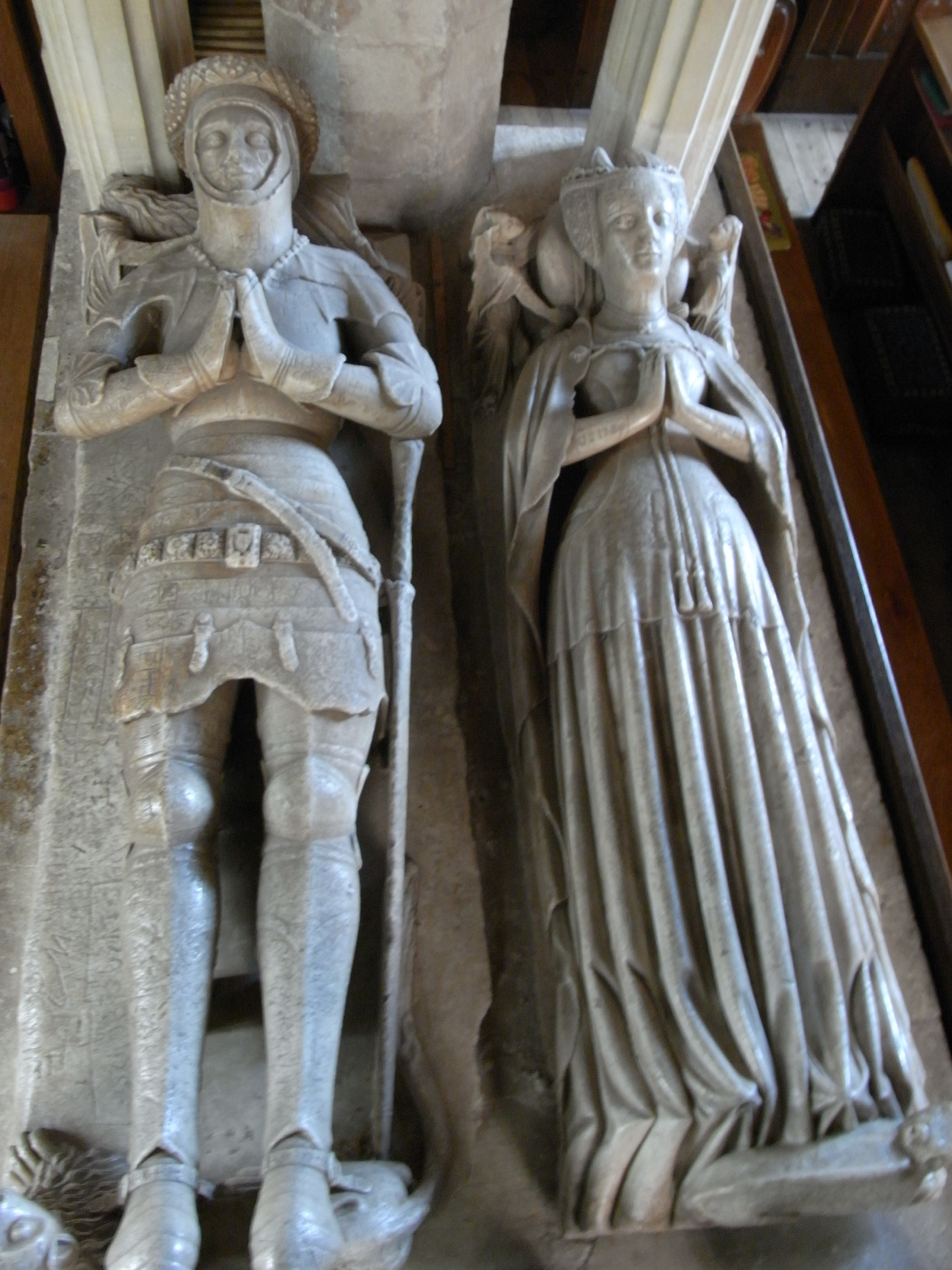
Alabaster effigies of John Harington, 4th Baron Harington and his wife Elizabeth Courtenay, at the Church of St Dubricius, Porlock in Somerset (circa 1471).

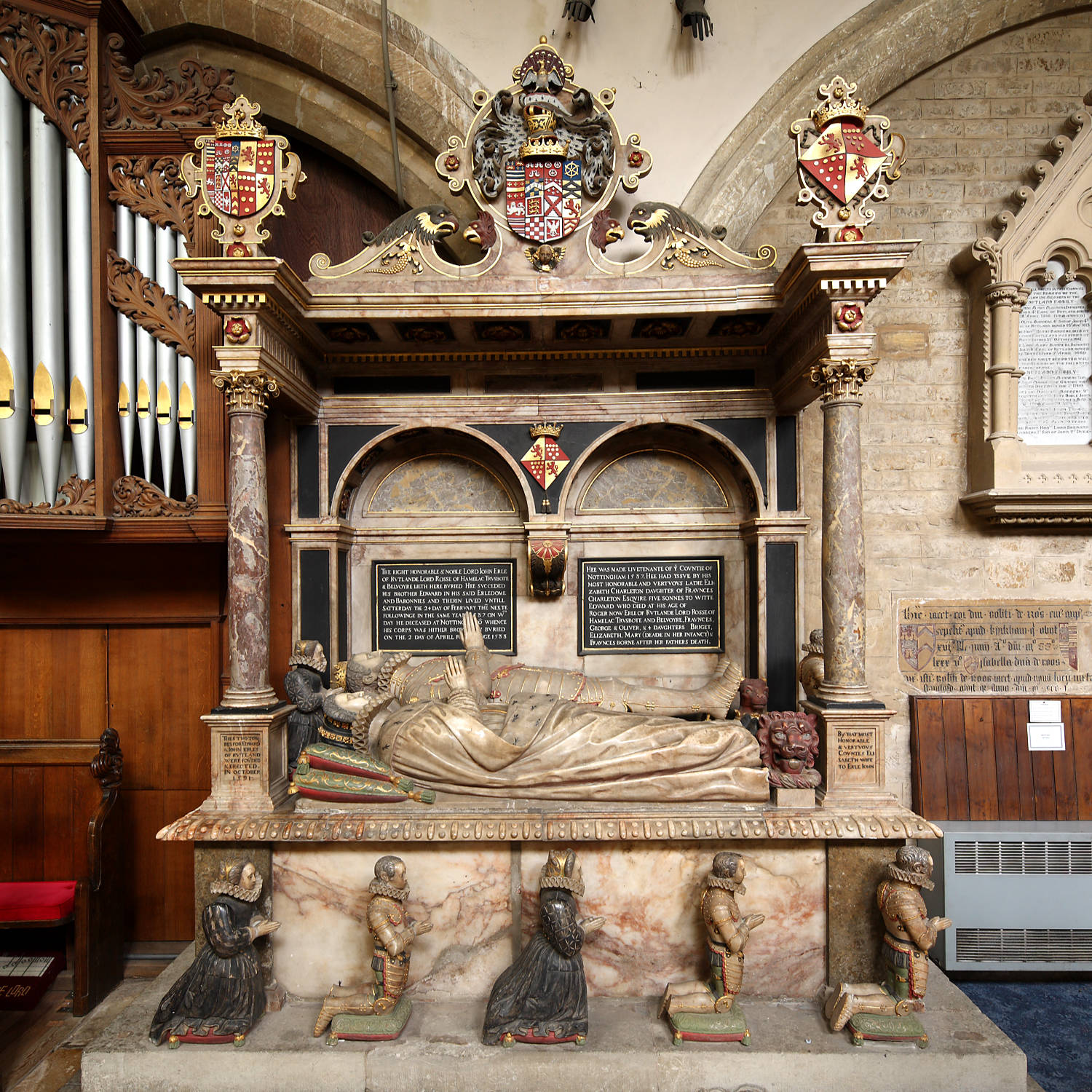
Monument to John Manners, 4th Earl of Rutland (d.1588) in St Mary the Virgin's church, Bottesford, Leicestershire, by Gerard Johnson the Elder.

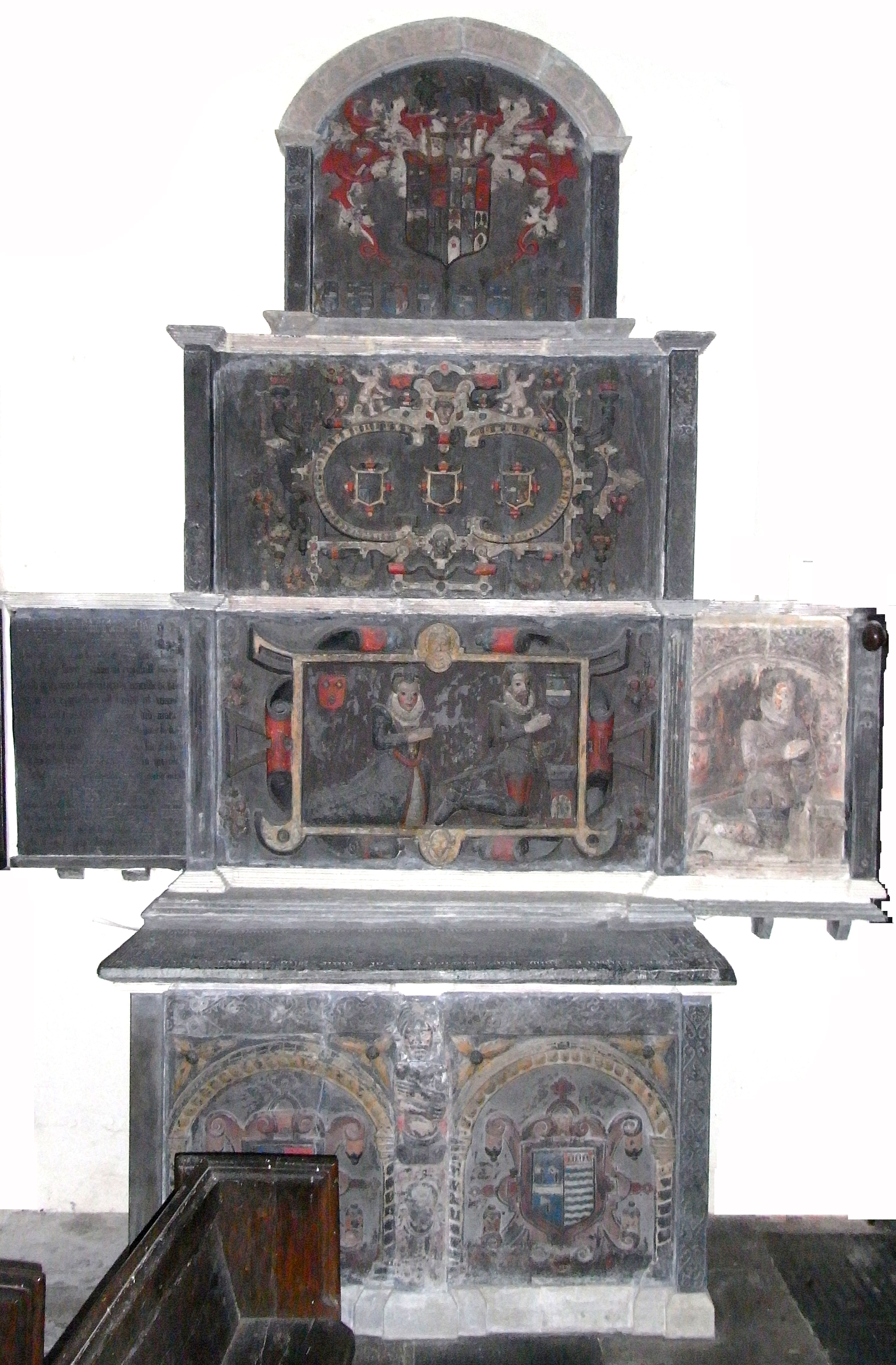
Monument to John Wrey (d.1597); originally in St Ive Church, Cornwall, but moved to St Peter's Church, Tawstock, Devon, in 1924.

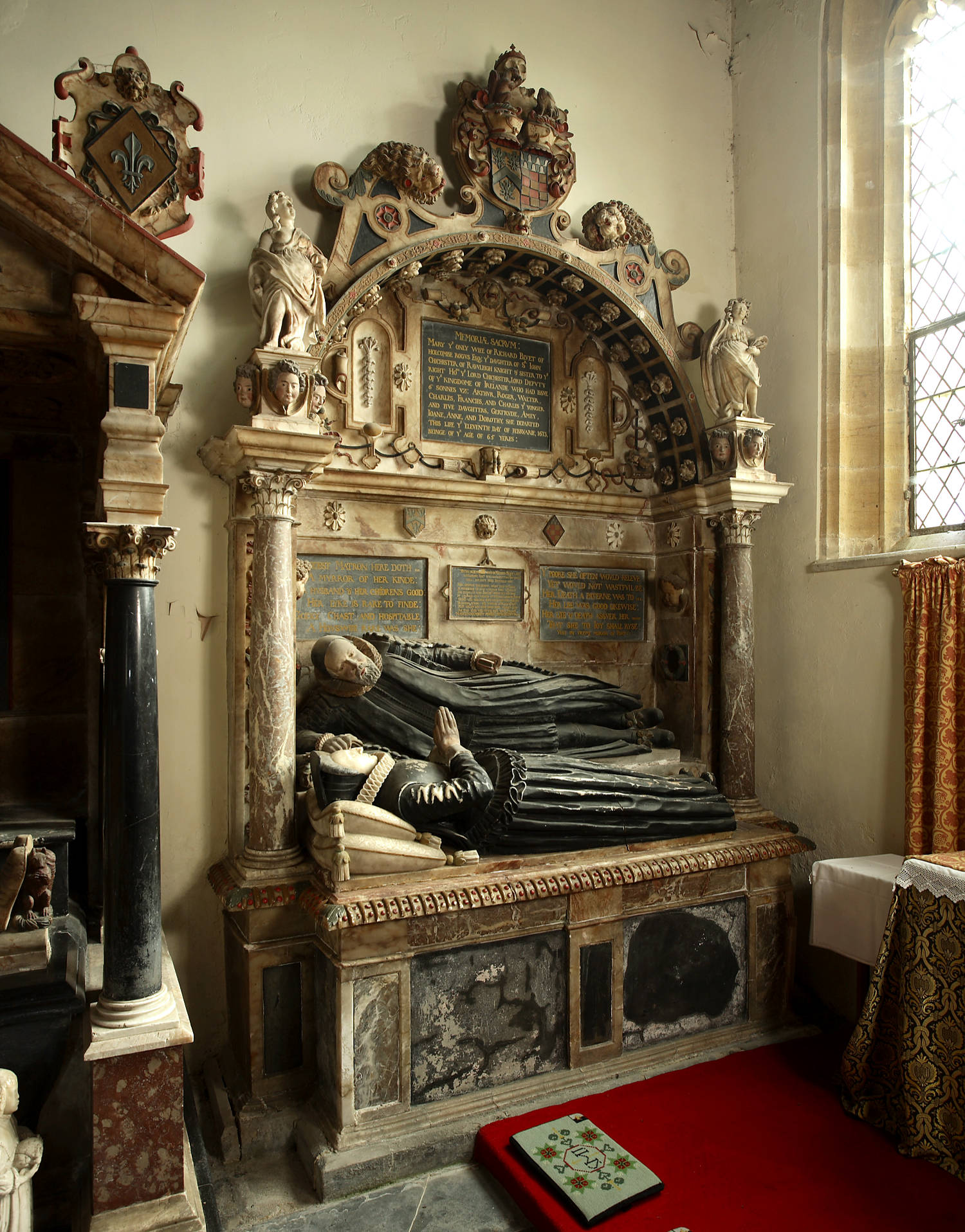
Monument to Richard Bluett (d.1614) and wife, Holcombe Rogus, Devon.

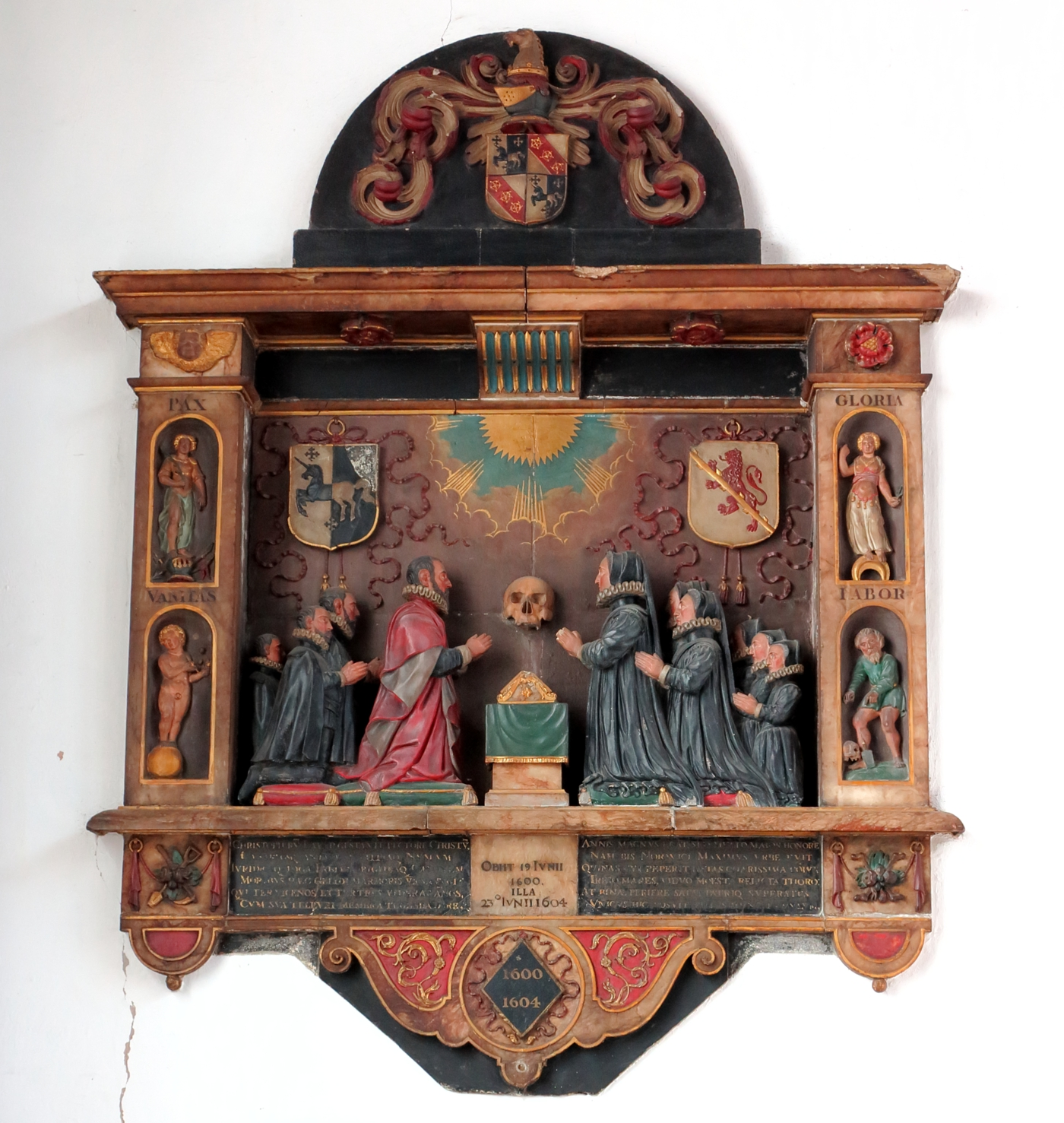
The Layer Monument Marble polychrome mural monument at the Church of Saint John the Baptist, Maddermarket, Norwich circa 1600.

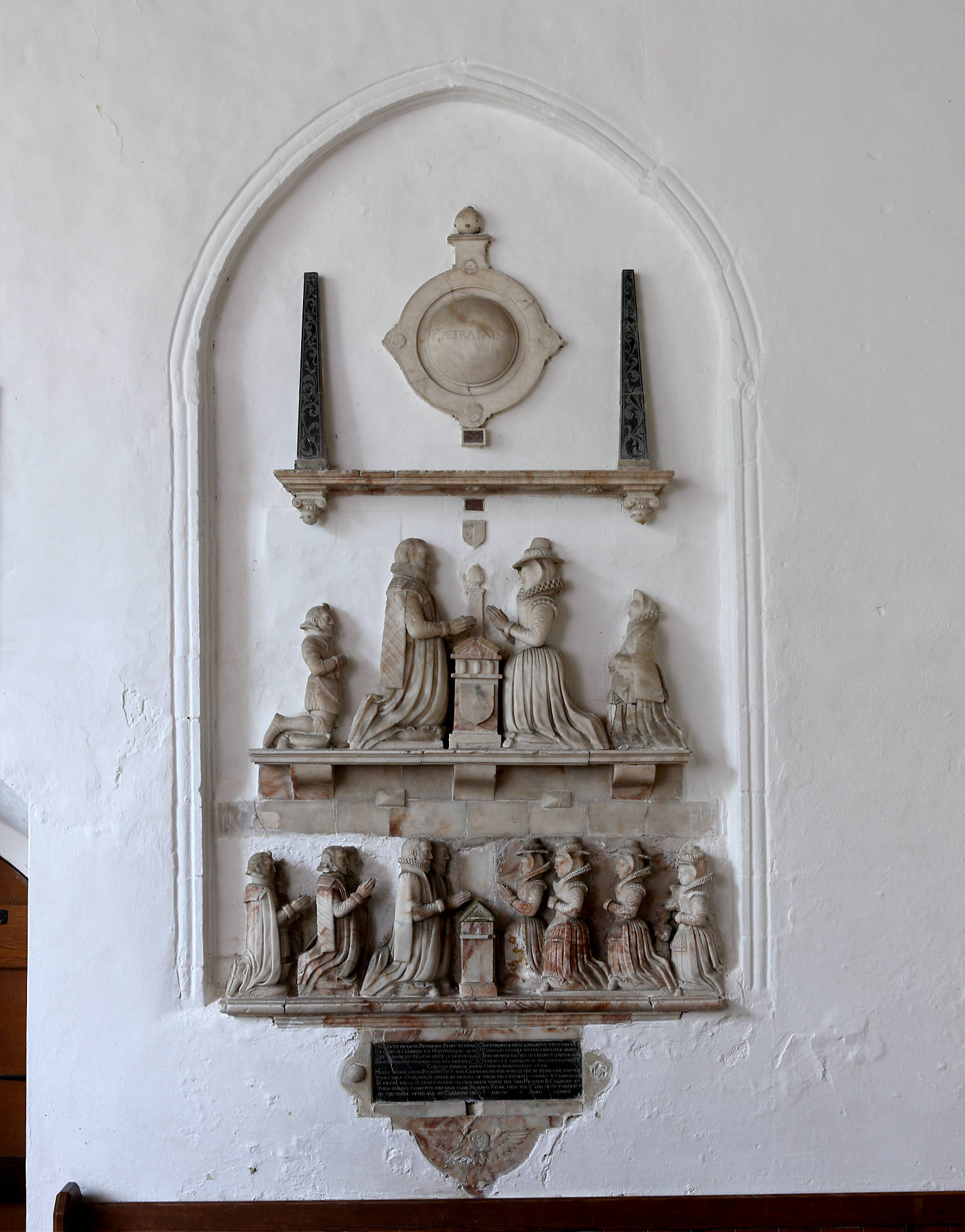
Monument to Richard Stone (d.1607) and family, Holme-next-the-Sea, Norfolk. The monument has been reassembled on the wall and is lacking its original architectural surround and backing.

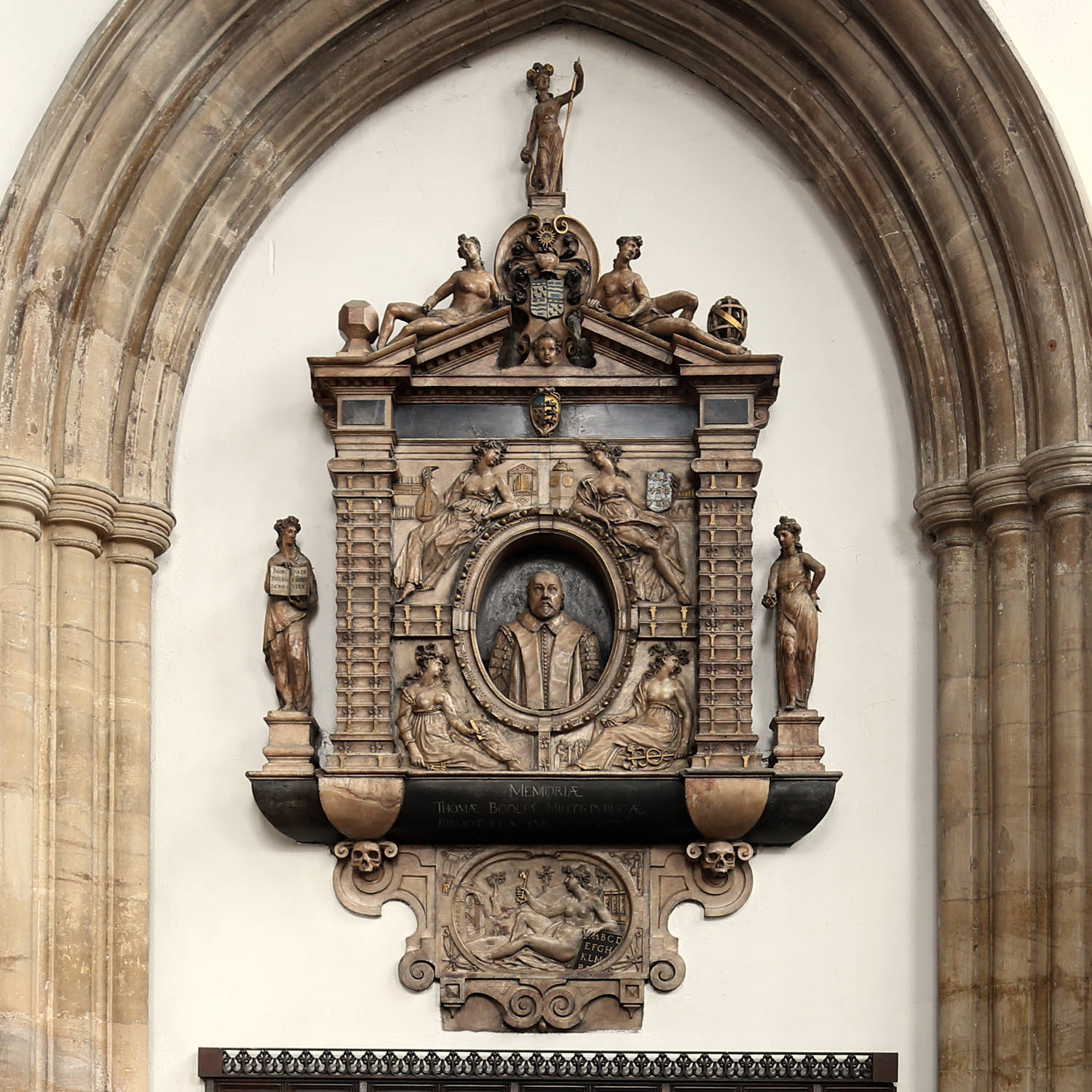
Monument to Sir Thomas Bodley (d.1613) by Nicholas Stone, Merton College, Oxford.

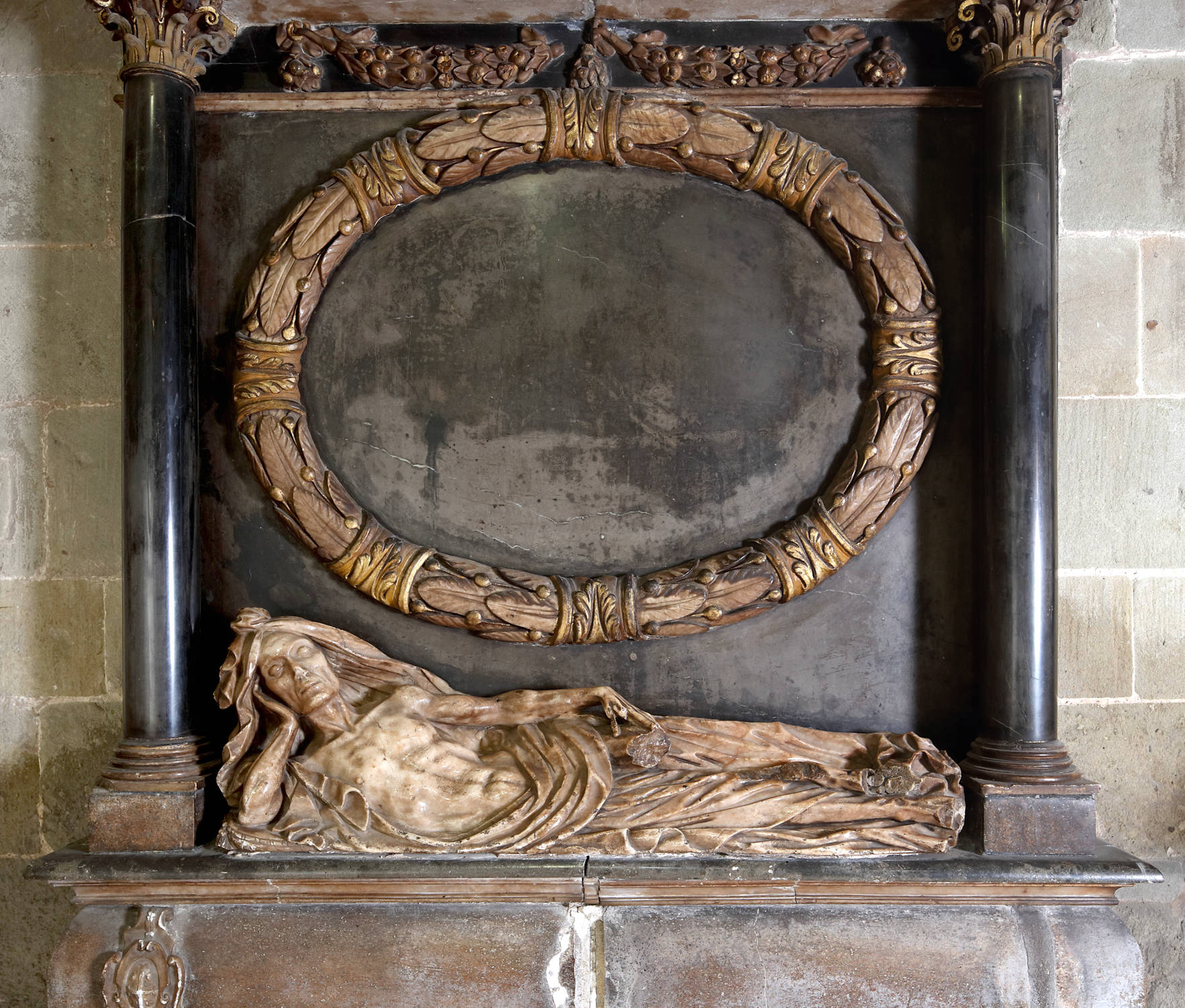
Detail of the monument to Cecily Walmstrey (d.1649), Worcester Cathedral. The wreathed oval medallion once held a painted inscription. She is shown as a strangely animated corpse in a winding sheet.

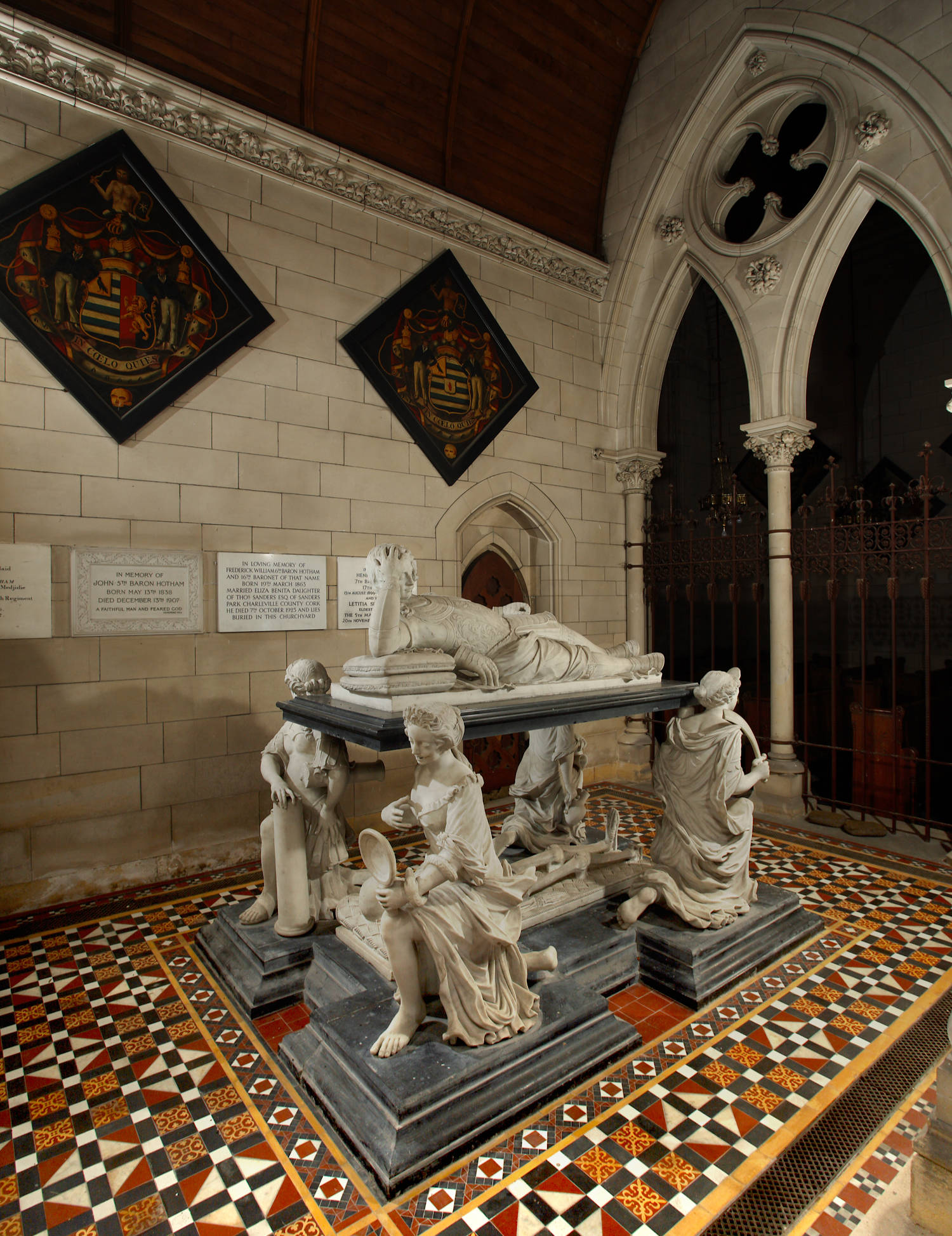
Monument to Sir John Hotham (d.1689), possibly by C. G. Cibber, with Hotham held above a skeleton by four kneeling virtues. South Dalton, Yorkshire East Riding

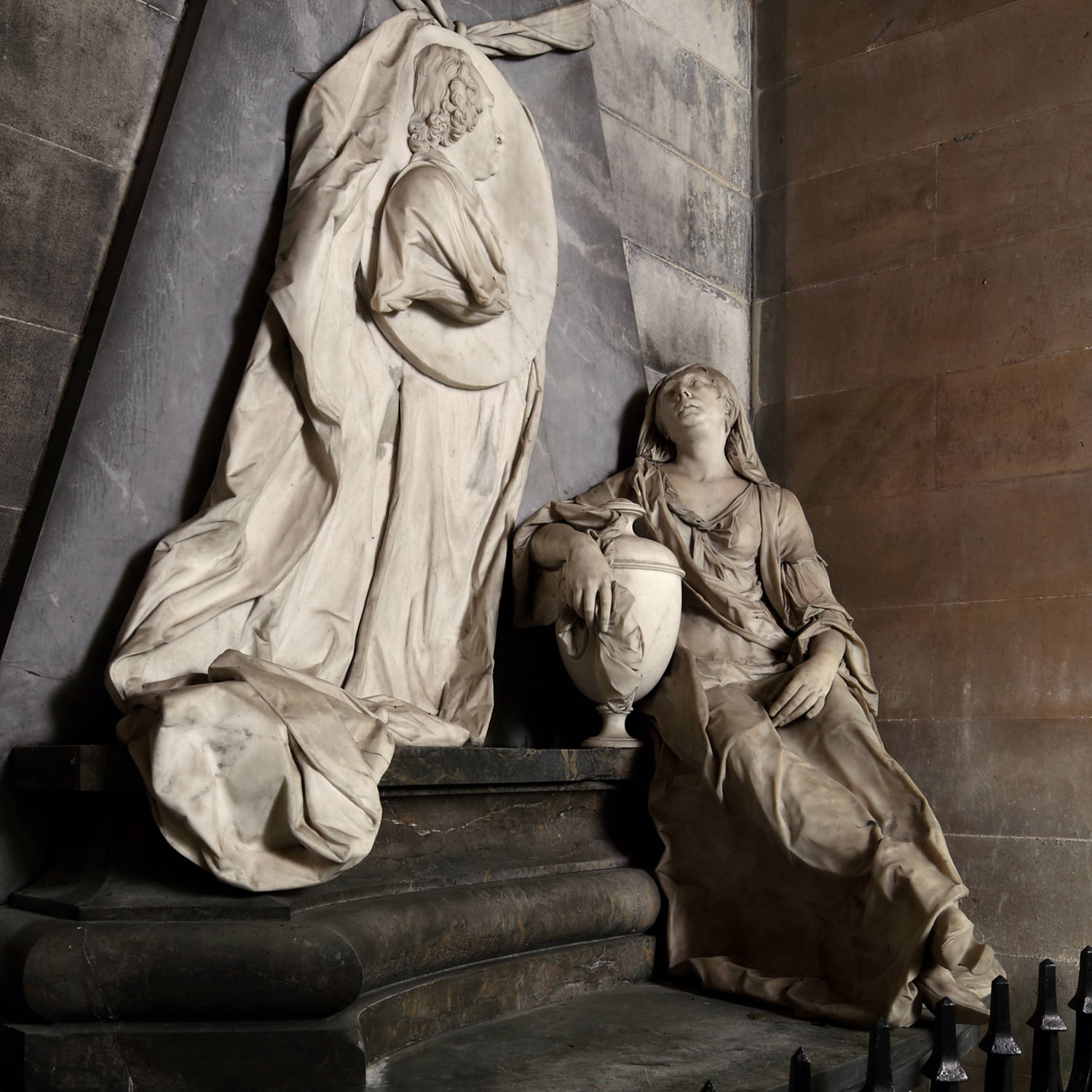
The monument to George Lynn (d.1758) by Louis-François Roubiliac, erecetd in 1760, at Southwick, Northamptonshire.

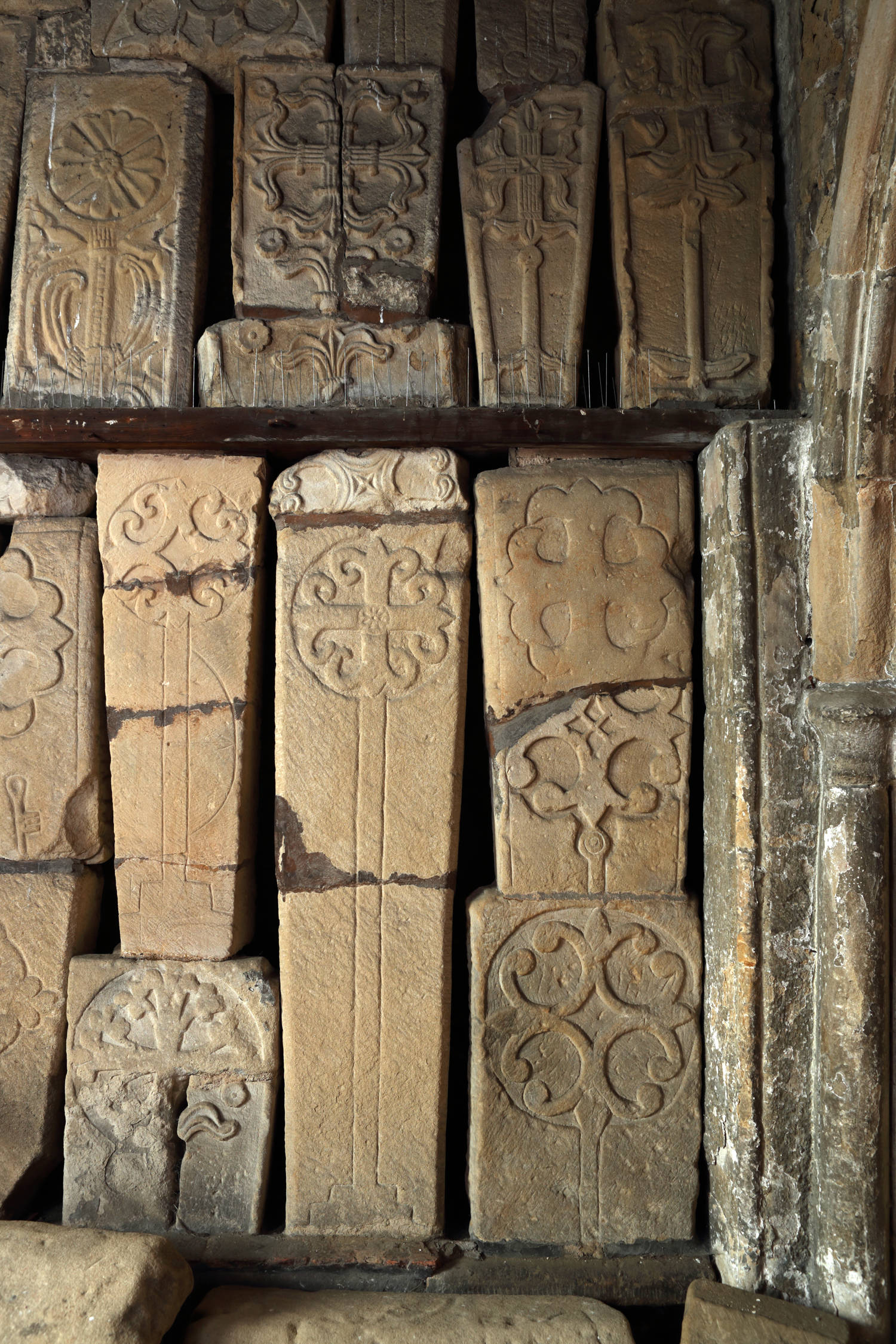
A group of 13th century cross slabs in the church porch at Bakewell, Derbyshire.

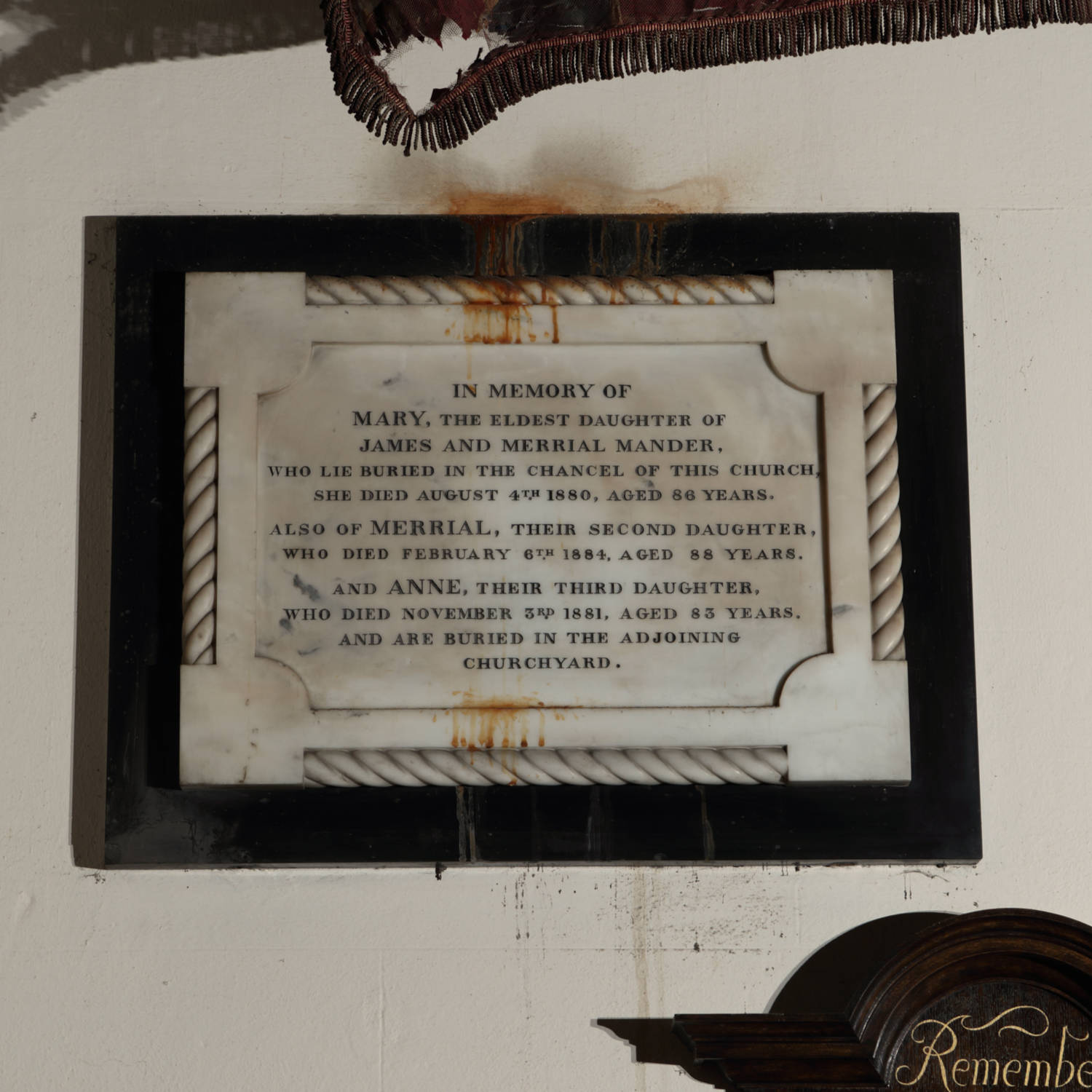
A typical late-Victorian wall tablet, this one of the 1880s to the Mander family, in the south-transept of the church at Bakewell, Derbyshire.

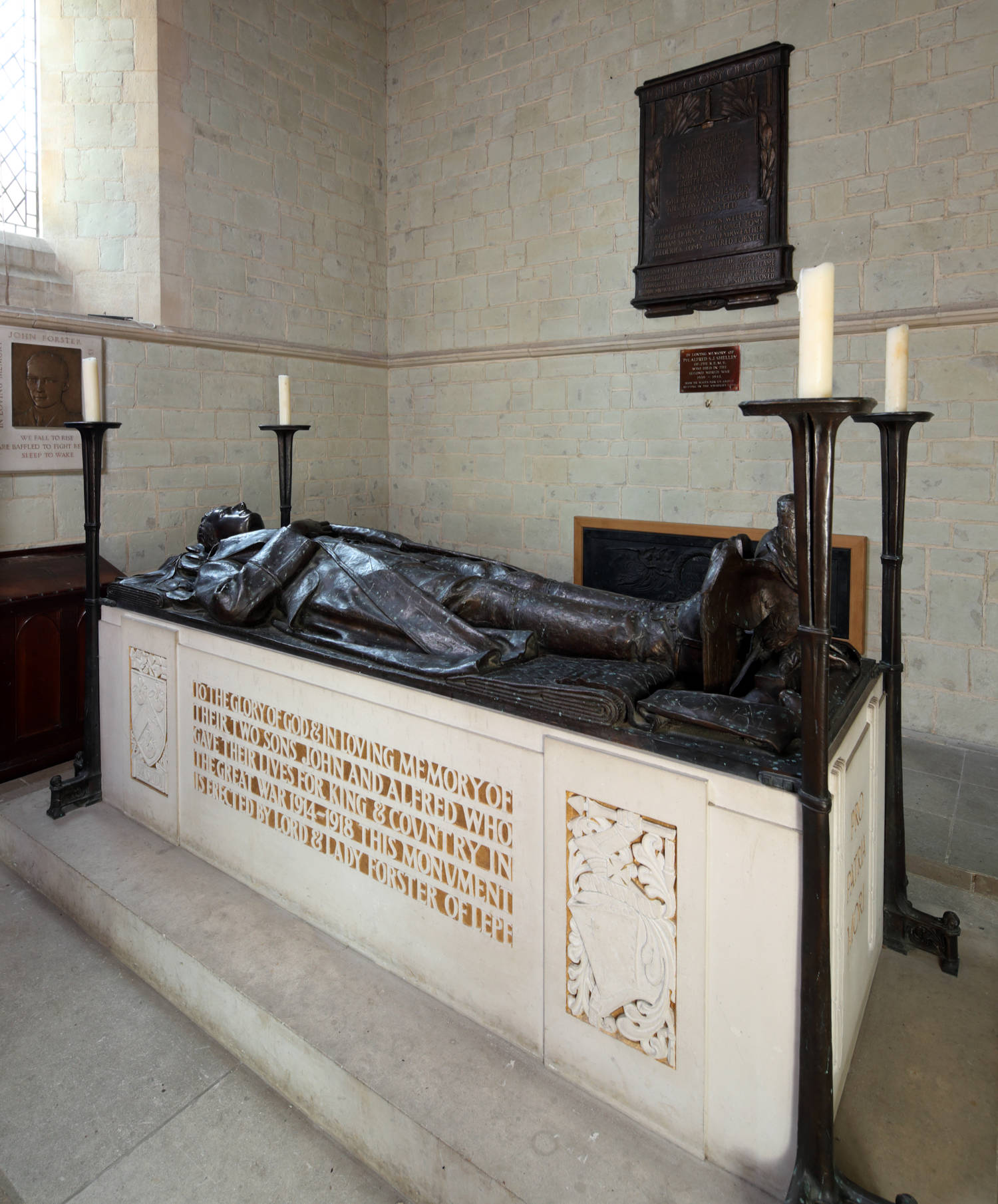
The bronze effigy by Cecil Thomas of a soldier commemorating brothers John and Alfred Forster at Exbury, Hampshire.

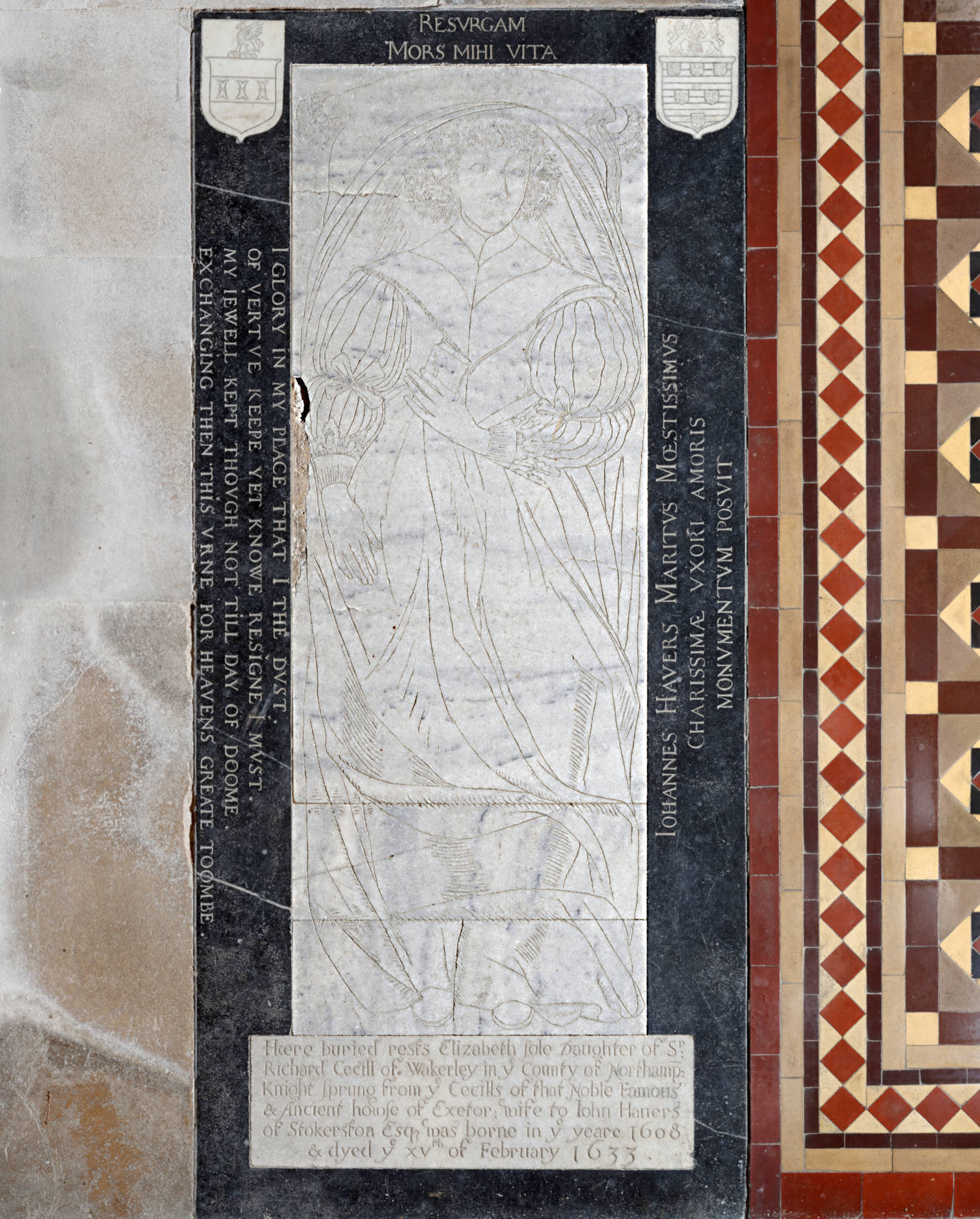
Incised slab in the chancel of the church commemorating Elizabeth Havers (1608-1633/4), Stockerston, Leicestershire. It was most likely made by William Wright of Charing Cross.

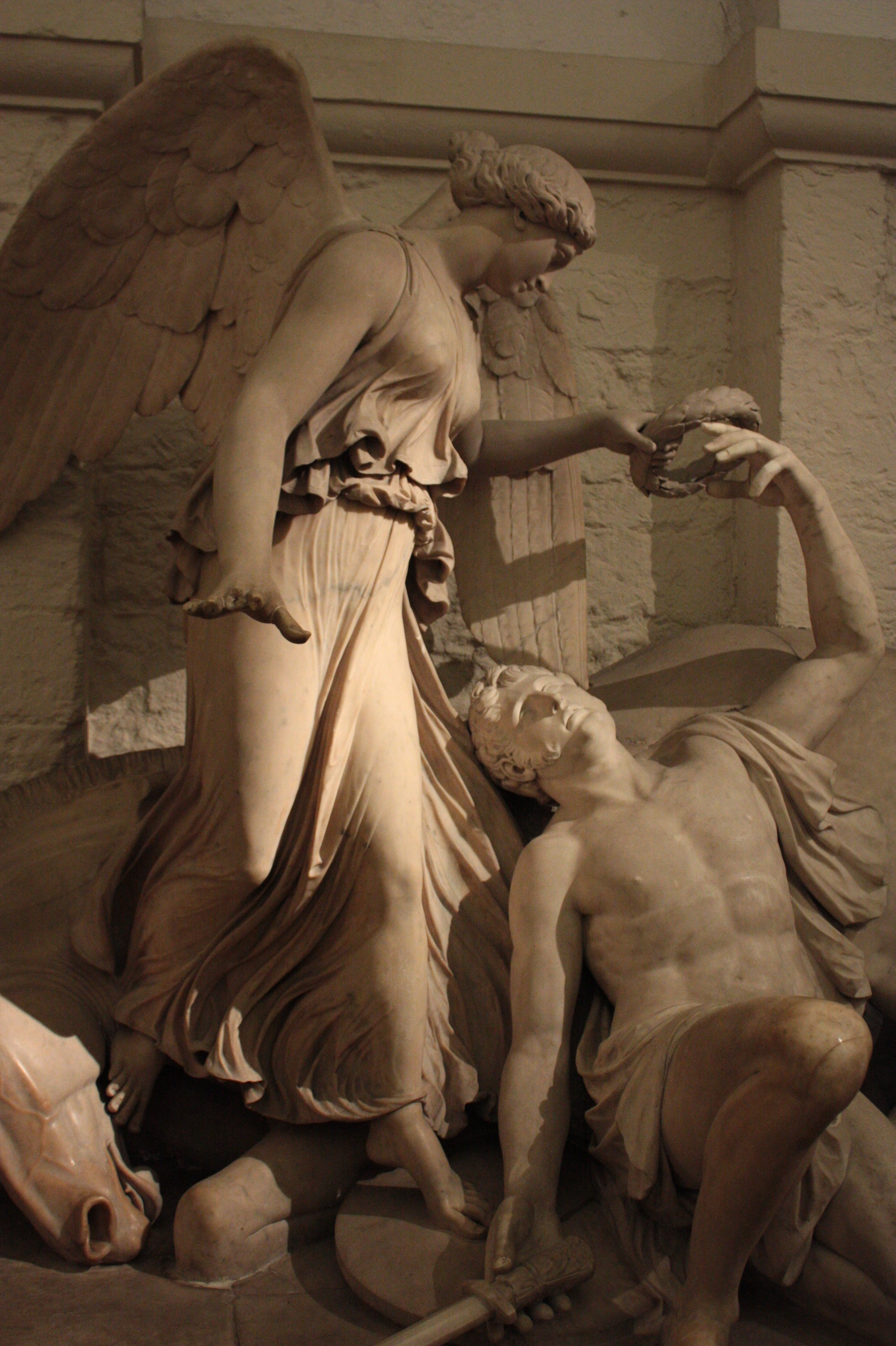
Monument to Major-General Sir William Ponsonby in the crypt of St Paul's Cathedral, London (1815). The winged figure of Victory symbolises the general's death at the Battle of Waterloo.

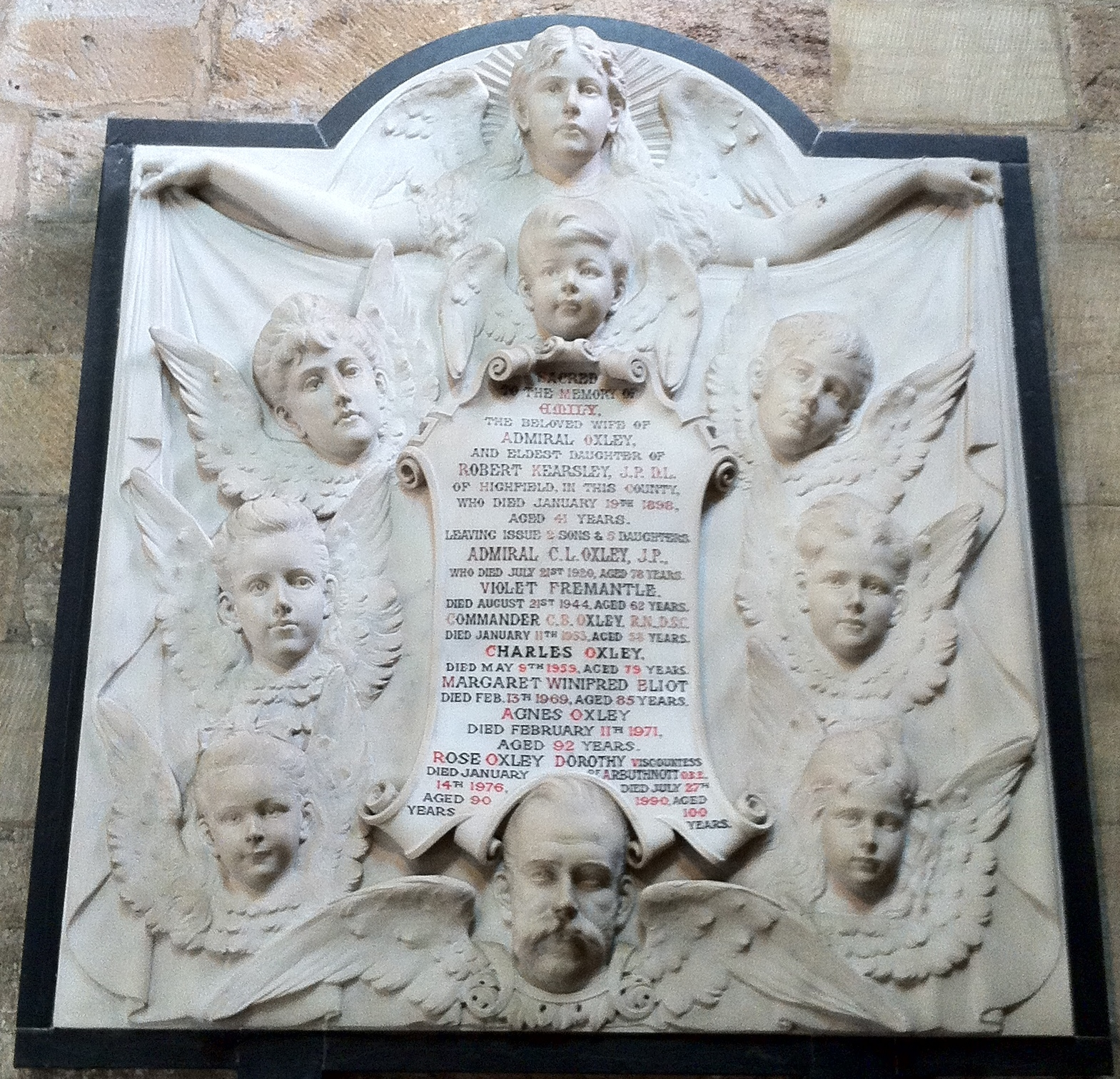
Monument to Emily, the wife of Admiral Charles Lister Oxley in Ripon Cathedral. The angelic heads depict the couple and their seven children (1898).

== See also ==
- An Arundel Tomb
- Funerary hatchment
- Ledger stone

== Sources ==
- Kemp, Brian (1980). English Church Monuments. London: B.T. Batsford. ISBN 0713417358.
- Newham, C. B. (2022). Country Church Monuments. London: Particular Books. ISBN 978-0-241-48833-1.
- Penny, Nicholas (1977). Church Monuments in Romantic England. London: Yale University Press. ISBN 0-300-02075-9.
- Whinney, Margaret (1988). Sculpture in Britain, 1530-1830. London: Penguin Books Ltd. ISBN 0-14-0561-23-4.
