= Asgarby, North Kesteven =

Hamlet in Lincolnshire, England

Coordinates: 52.993323°N 0.337620°W

Asgarby
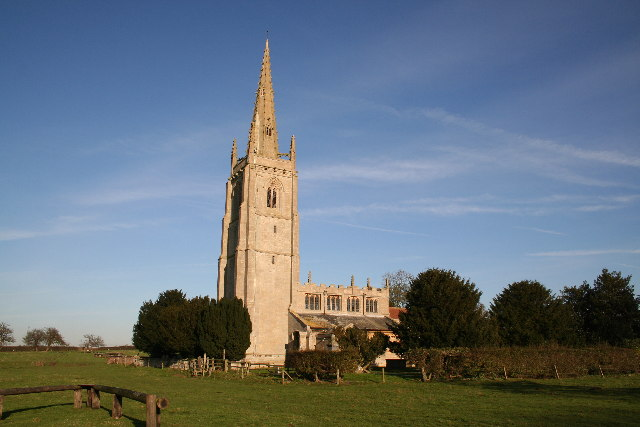
- Church of St Andrew, Asgarby

- Location within Lincolnshire
- OS grid reference: TF116452
  - London: 100 mi (160 km) S
- Civil parish: Asgarby and Howell
- District: North Kesteven
- Shire county: Lincolnshire
- Region: East Midlands
- Country: England
- Sovereign state: United Kingdom
- Post town: Sleaford
- Postcode district: NG34
- Police: Lincolnshire
- Fire: Lincolnshire
- Ambulance: East Midlands
- UK Parliament: Sleaford and North Hykeham

Asgarby is a village in the civil parish of Asgarby and Howell, in the North Kesteven district of Lincolnshire, England.

== Geography ==
It is situated on the A17 Boston to Newark road, 3 miles (5 km) east from Sleaford and 2 miles (3 km) north-west from Heckington. In 1921 the parish had a population of 63. On 1 April 1931 the parish was abolished to form "Asgarby and Howell".

Construction to realign the A17 began in July 1967, to replace the dangerous Asgarby bends, being a three-quarter mile, to cost £100,000, built by A.F. Budge. It was opened by January 1968.

== History ==
Asgarby Grade I listed Anglican church is dedicated to St Andrew. The church has a crocketed spire and buttresses, a Decorated nave, and an Early English priests' doorway.
