= Payson =

Payson may refer to:

== Places in the United States ==
- Payson, Arizona
- Payson, Illinois
  - Payson Township, Illinois, in Adams County
- Payson, Utah

== People ==
- Edward Payson (1783–1827), American Congregational preacher
- Edwin Blake Payson (1893–1927), American botanist
- Joan Whitney Payson (1903–1975), American businesswoman and New York Mets owner
- Phillips Payson (1704–1778), American minister for the town of Dorchester, Massachusetts from 1728
- Samuel Phillips Payson (1736–1801), American minister for the town of Chelsea, Massachusetts from 1757
- Sandra Payson (1926–2004), American arts patron, socialite
- William Farquhar Payson (1876–1939), notable American author
- William P. Richardson (law school dean) (1864–1945), American co-founder and first Dean of Brooklyn Law School
