= Rumney Marsh Burying Ground =

Historic cemetery in Massachusetts, United States

- U.S. National Register of Historic Places
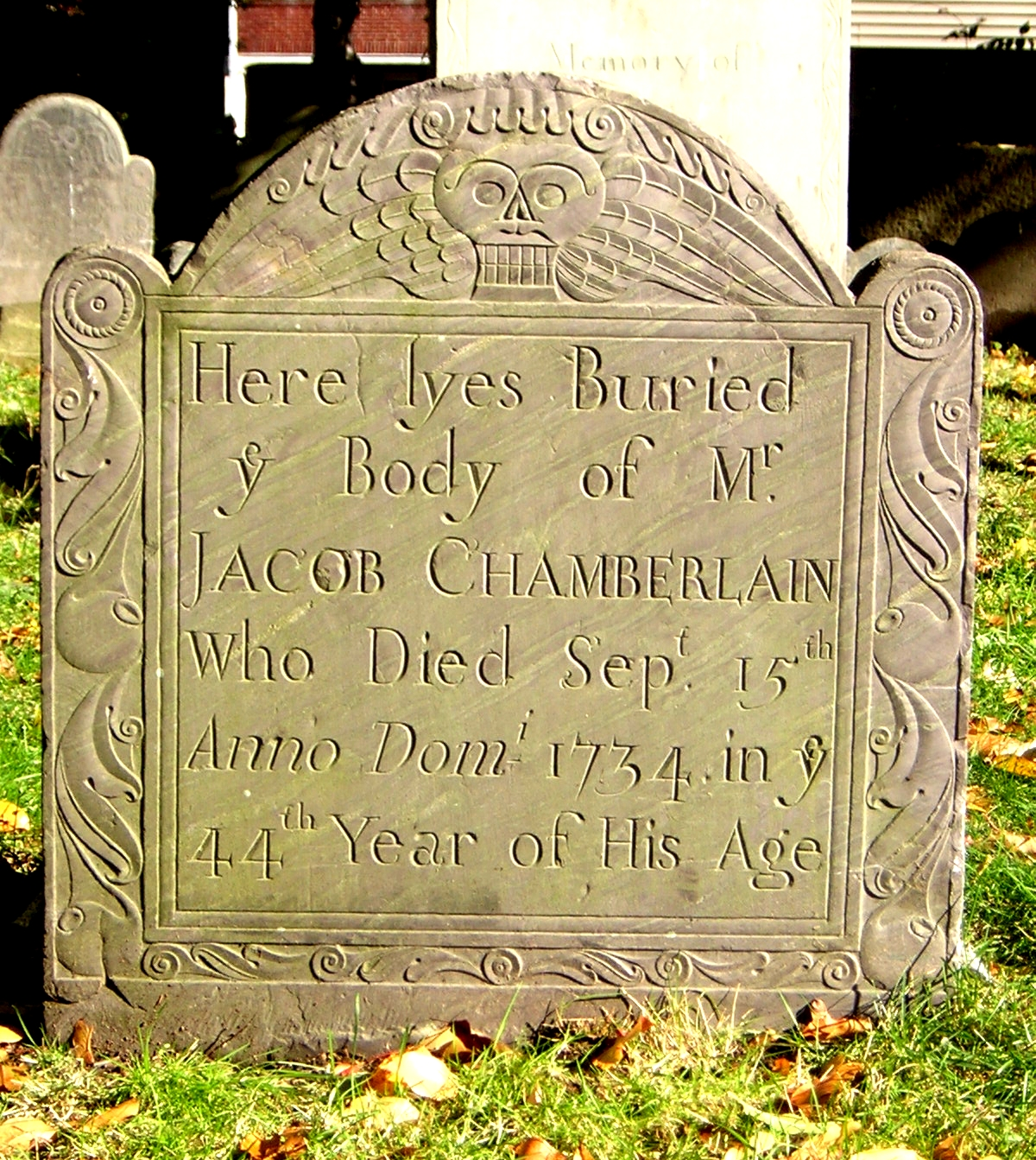

- Location within Massachusetts Location within the United States
- Location: Butler St. at Elm and Bixby Sts., Revere, Massachusetts
- Coordinates: 42°24′28″N 71°0′21″W
- Area: less than one acre
- Architect: Lamson, Joseph
- NRHP reference No.: 04000025
- Added to NRHP: February 11, 2004

The Rumney Marsh Burying Ground is a historic cemetery on Butler Street between Elm and Bixby Streets in Revere, Massachusetts. It was added to the National Register of Historic Places in 2004. It was the first burying ground of an area that now encompasses Revere as well as neighboring Chelsea and Winthrop.

The land was originally owned by Samuel Cole. In 1654 William Hasey purchased it; his descendants sold it to Joshua Cheever, Esq. in 1740. Cheever and the town of Chelsea (of which Revere was still part) agreed on March 7, 1743 that the land would be a burying place and he deeded it to the town on December 8, 1751.

Prior to the establishment of this burying ground, people who lived in the area were buried in Boston's Copp's Hill Burying Ground. After a smallpox epidemic swept the city in 1690, Boston officials ordered that its victims north of the Charles River be buried "on that side of the Water". Some victims of this epidemic may have been the first burials at Rumney Marsh. The first documented burial was that of Mary Smith, wife of John Smith, in 1693. The last burial was in 1929.

The cemetery is notable for containing the graves of sixteen Black individuals, some free and some enslaved, whose burials are documented in part by an 1897 map of the site. Two plaques stand along the Northern wall of the cemetery providing the names, dates of death, and approximate ages of these individuals, as well as some of the names of their enslavers. Most are buried along the Northern wall. However, according to a 1938 book called "The History of Revere" by Benjamin Shurtleff, three – Job Worrow (a veteran of the Revolutionary War serving under Captain Samuel Sprague, who is also buried in the Rumney Marsh Burying Ground), Betty Worrow, and Fanny Fairweather – are buried in the Southeast corner. Although none of these individuals' graves are marked, Fanny Fairweather is reported by Shurtleff to have had a monument with the inscription "Fanny Fairweather, died 1845, age 80, a native of Africa."

Since many of the burials were in the 18th century, the cemetery is exemplary of funerary art during the colonial period. For example, many of the slate gravestones feature a skull and wings motif. Two gravestones have been specifically identified as the work of carver Joseph Lamson (1658–1722); that of Mary Cutler (died 1703), and that of John Winthrop's son Deane Winthrop (died 1703/4). Work by stone carvers Robert Fowle and Richard Adams can also be found among the graves.

People buried in the cemetery include:

- Deane Winthrop, son of John Winthrop, governor of the Massachusetts Bay Colony. Deane Winthrop's House, also on the National Register, is nearby in Winthrop.
- Phillips Payson, the fighting pastor, hero of the Battle of Lexington
- Sixteen enslaved and free Black people
- Veterans of the Colonial, Revolutionary, 1812, and Civil Wars.
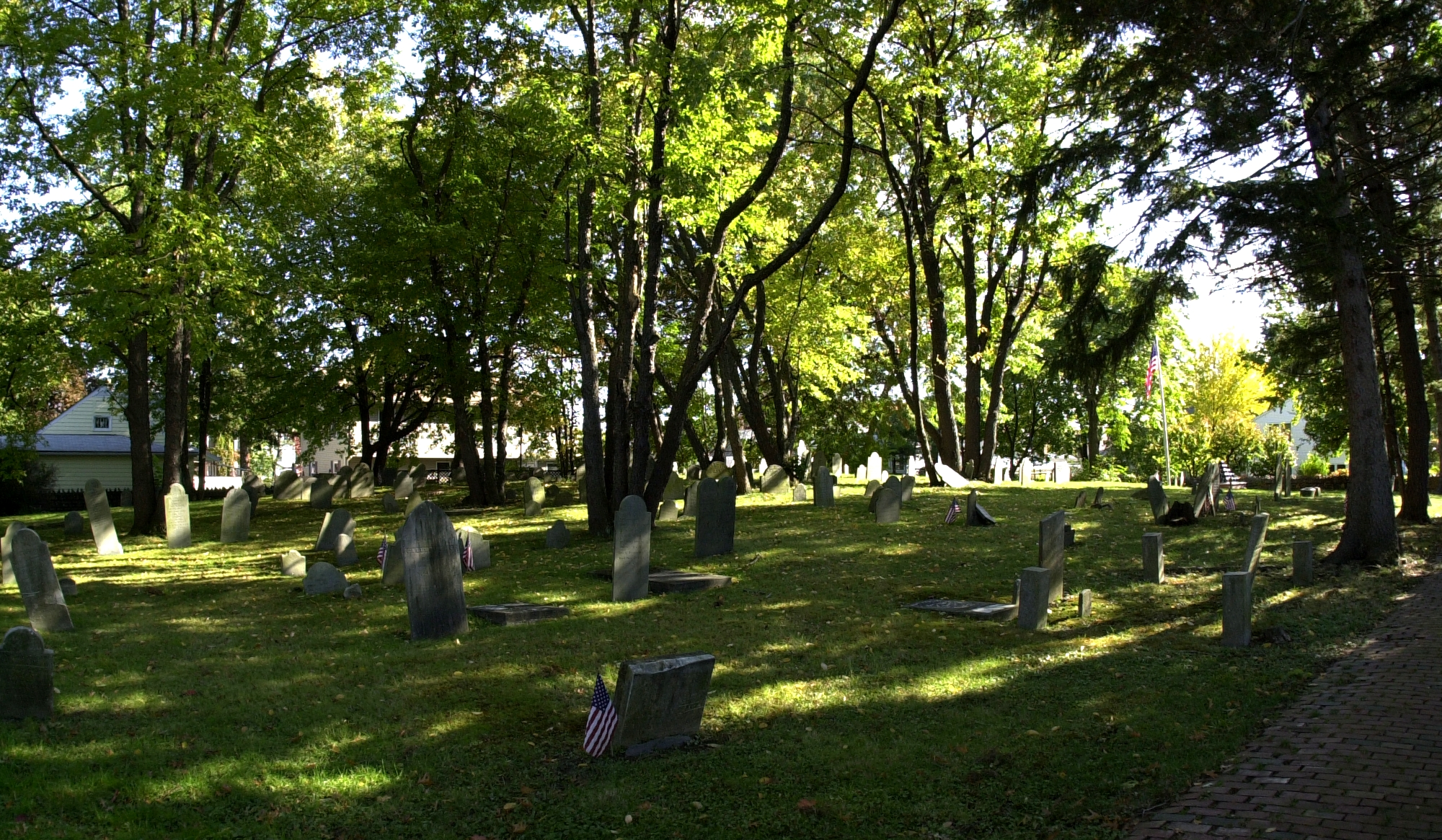

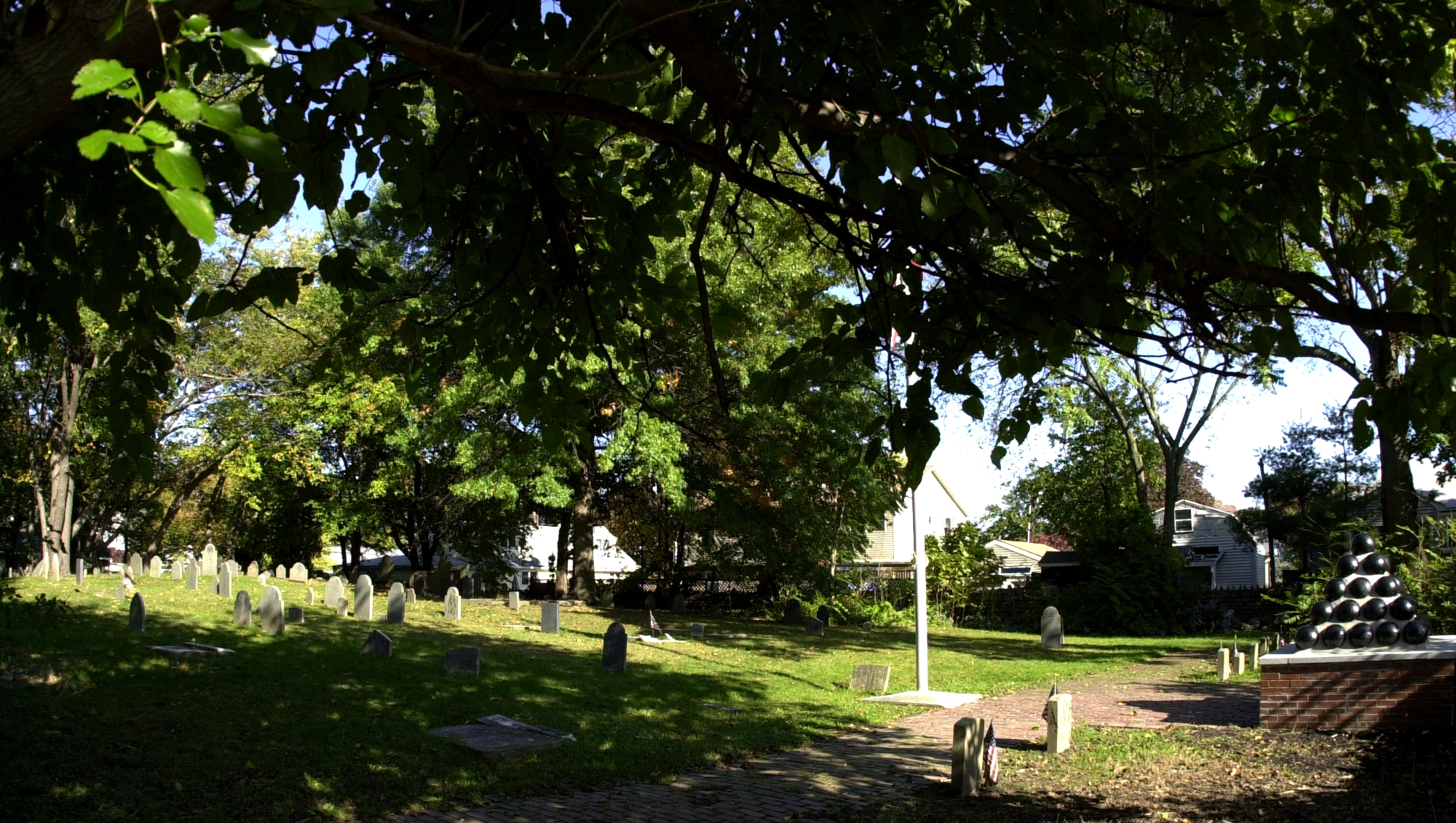

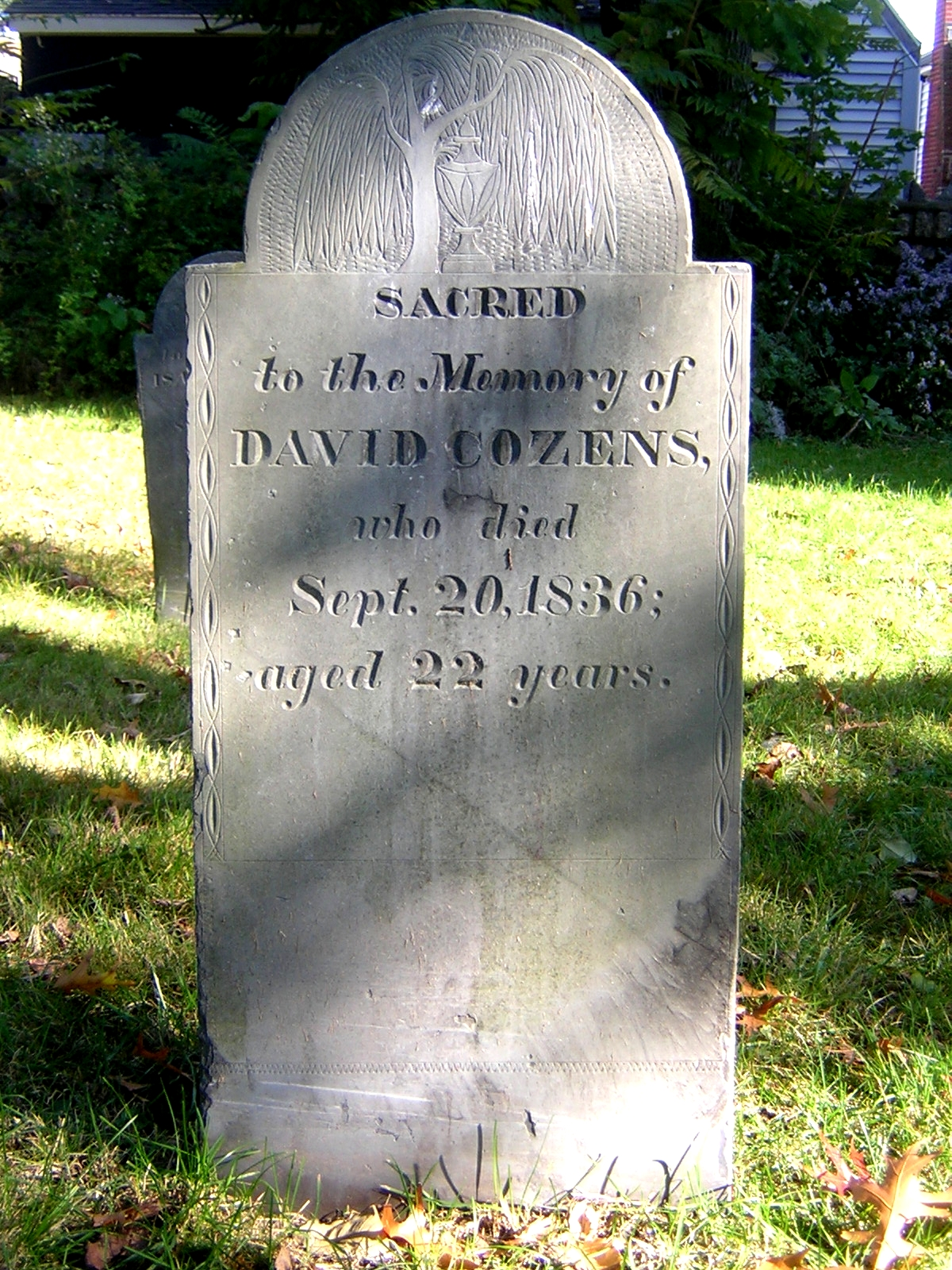

== See also ==
- National Register of Historic Places listings in Suffolk County, Massachusetts
