= William Wright of Charing Cross =

William Wright (d. 1654) was an English tomb sculptor who worked in London during the first half of the 17th century. Despite initially training as a haberdasher rather than following the conventional path of mason's training typical for London sculptors of his era, Wright established a successful workshop and became renowned for his church monuments.

== Early life and training ==
Wright appears to have trained as a haberdasher and was likely one of two people of that name who were made free of the Haberdashers' Company of London at the start of the seventeenth century. This unconventional background for a sculptor may explain what art historian Adam White described as Wright being "at best semi-literate in the vocabulary of classical architecture, with little idea how to use it either decoratively or structurally."

== Career and workshop ==
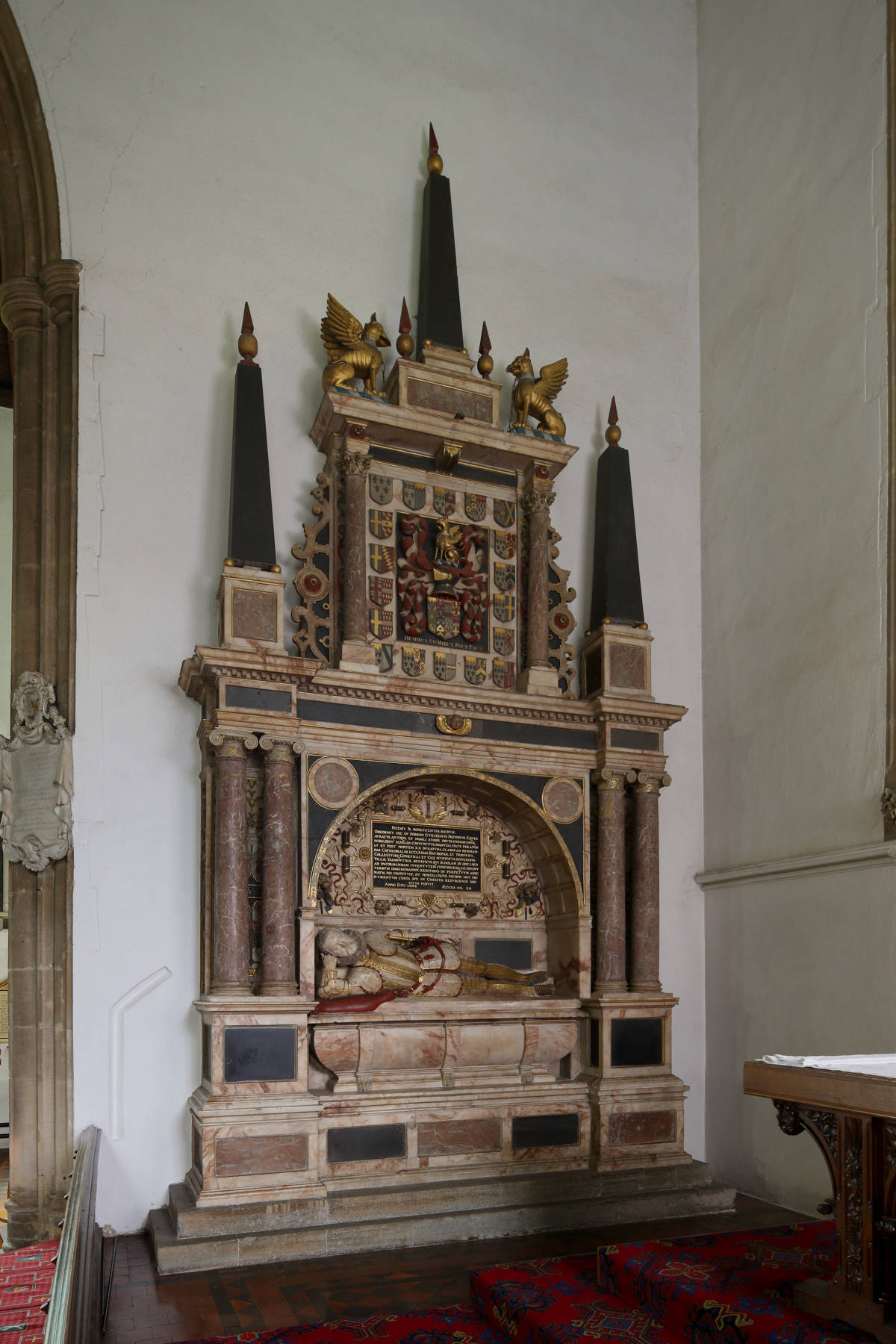
The monument to Sir William Paston, North Walsham, Norfolk.

Wright is first recorded in the ratebooks of the parish of St Martin in the Fields, Westminster from 1607-08, where he remained until his death. Within this parish, he established his workshop at or near Charing Cross, Westminster, where he both lived and worked. He served in the parish as a churchwarden and as an 'accomptant' (accountant) for the poor rate.

Wright's artistic career began in 1608 in partnership with the obscure sculptor John Key, with whom he created the monument to Sir William Paston at North Walsham, Norfolk. This early work followed conventional practices, relying on height and architectural display for effect.

Throughout his career, Wright was frequently described as a 'stonecutter', suggesting he also earned his living by supplying cut stone to other sculptors. He employed other sculptors part-time in his workshop. In 1613, Wright was convicted of a minor criminal offence for causing a nuisance by loading carts in a street near Charing Cross, and he later incurred the displeasure of the Office of Works by absenting himself from royal service and causing his employees to do likewise.

== Artistic development ==
Wright's monuments from the earlier part of his career featured recumbent or kneeling figures housed within impressive architectural settings. Notable examples from this period include monuments to Edward Talbot, 8th Earl of Shrewsbury (c. 1619) in Westminster Abbey, Sir Robert Gardener (c. 1620) in Elmswell, Suffolk, and Edward Seymour, Earl of Hertford and his family (c. 1621) in Salisbury Cathedral.

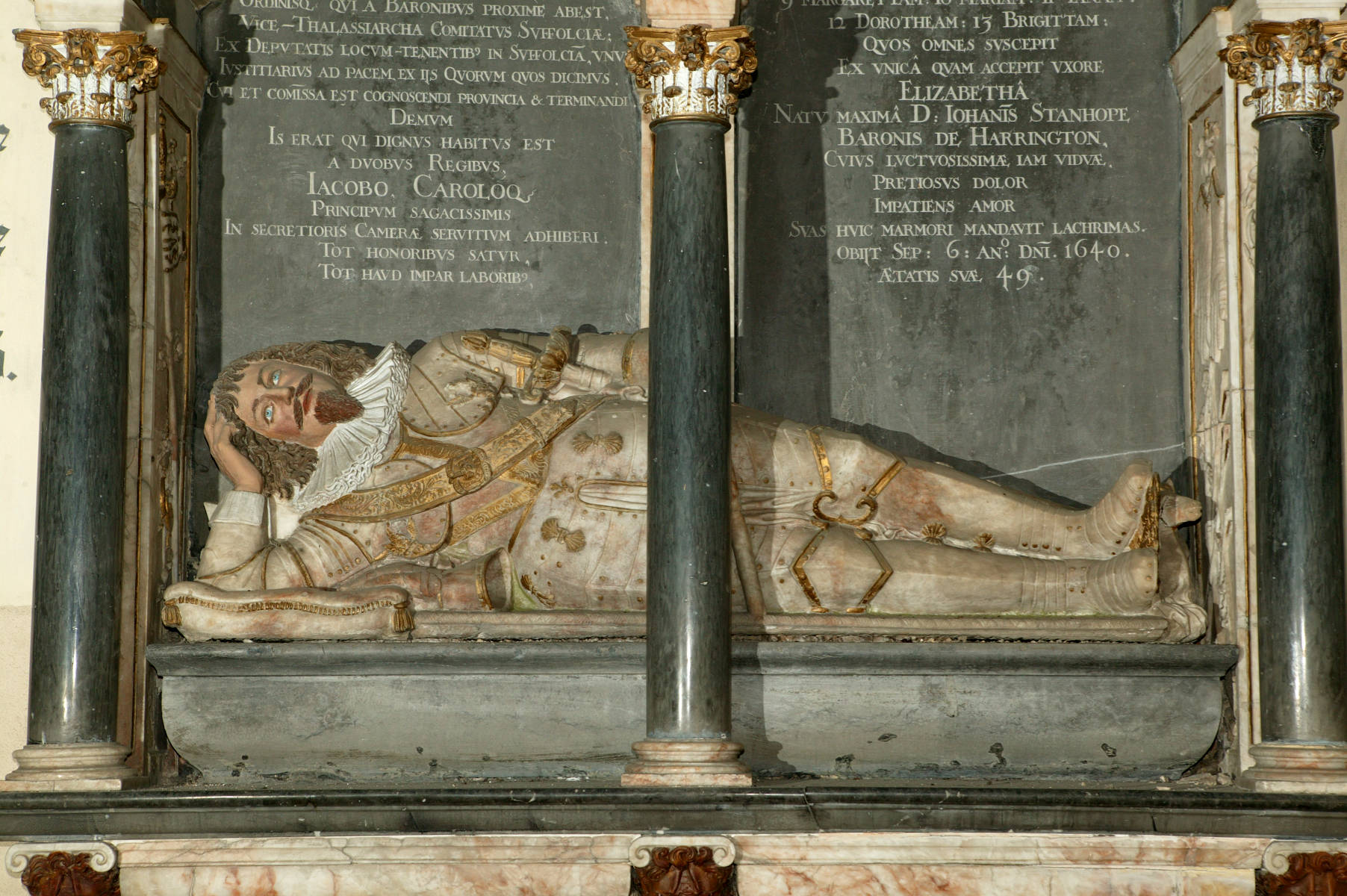
Monument to Sir Lionel Tollemache, Helmingham, Suffolk.

In the latter part of his career, Wright adopted the fashionable style of shrouded effigies, revealing considerable talent for figure sculpture. Particularly notable examples include the monuments to Sara Colvile (d. 1632) at Chelsea Old Church, Anne, Lady Deane (1634) at Great Maplestead, Essex, and Sir John Denham (c. 1639) at Egham, Surrey.

However, Wright's later work was sometimes criticized for bizarre design choices, particularly his tendency to place columns that intruded between viewers and the effigies, as seen in monuments to Sir Richard Scott (1640), Sir Lionel Tollemache (c. 1640), and Sir Robert Wiseman (c. 1641).

== Commonwealth period and death ==
Wright's workshop found favour during the early years of the Commonwealth. Notably, the monument to Henry Ireton in Westminster Abbey was commissioned in 1654 by order of the Council of State and Oliver Cromwell, who was Ireton's father-in-law. This monument was later destroyed in 1660.

Wright died in 1654, apparently childless and intestate. Art historians have identified twelve monuments as definitively by Wright through documentary evidence, with a further fifty-two attributed to him with near certainty.

== Documented monuments ==
- Sir William Paston (1608) - St Nicholas, North Walsham, Norfolk
- Edward, Earl of Shrewsbury and his wife (c. 1619) - Westminster Abbey
- Sir William Pelham and his wife (1629-30) - Brocklesby, Lincolnshire
- Sir James Whitelock and his wife (1632-33) - Fawley, Buckinghamshire
- Sir Henry Slingsby (1632/33-34) - St John the Baptist, Knaresborough, North Yorkshire
- Sir Richard Scott (1640) - St Mary the Virgin, Ecclesfield, South Yorkshire
- Henry Ireton and his wife (c. 1651-54) - Westminster Abbey (destroyed)
- Thomas Knatchbull, his wife and his parents (1653) - All Saints, Maidstone, Kent

== Sources ==
- White, Adam, A Biographical Dictionary of London Tomb Sculptors, The Volume of the Walpole Society, 61 (1999), pp. 144-155.
