= 1647 North American influenza epidemic =

American influenza epidemic

- Disease: Influenza
- Location: North America
- First reported: New England
- Date: Spring and summer 1647

In the spring and summer of 1647, an "epidemical sickness" prevailed throughout the New England Colonies and along the coast of English America. Considered the first documented influenza epidemic in North America, the outbreak is said to have spread all the way to the West Indies, where significant mortality was reported.

== History ==
According to Noah Webster, this outbreak was the first recorded epidemic of influenza in North America, though it was not designated as such at the time. The exact origins of this visitation of the disease are unknown, but it was "probably" introduced by the Spanish or other Europeans. According to the United States Public Health Service, it was transported from Valencia. Indeed, influenza was reportedly present in Spain during the year of this epidemic.

The disease was present in Windsor, Connecticut Colony, possibly as early as the late winter of 1647. Its prevalence in that town has been implicated in the accusations of witchcraft against Alse Young, who was executed on that charge on 26 May.

John Winthrop, the Puritan Governor of the Massachusetts Bay Colony, describes the "epidemical sickness" as prevailing in the month of June, afflicting "Indians and English, French and Dutch." On the 8th, the Cambridge Synod convened in that town for its second session. However, it was quickly suspended on account of the prevailing sickness and adjourned until the following year.

In July, the disease was present in Barnstable, where there was reportedly "sickness upon every family and every one in every family," a state of affairs that compelled the church in that town to observe a fast on the 22nd.

The disease seemed to spread along the entire coast, throughout the English plantations. It is said to have ultimately arrived in the West Indies, specifically Barbados and Saint Kitts, where, according to Winthrop's account, some 5,000 died on each island this year. This disaster came in the wake of a major drought, which "burnt up" all the crops and compelled the inhabitants to turn begrudgingly to New England for help.

There is some ambiguity regarding the relationship between this devastating outbreak in the West Indies and the "epidemical sickness" that prevailed in New England. Subsequent accounts of this epidemic, such as that of William Hubbard in his A General History of New England (citing Winthrop and later cited by Webster), directly connect the two events, though Winthrop's account is not so explicit in this respect. On the contrary, regarding this "great mortality", Winthrop states that "whether it were the plague, or the pestilent fever, it killed in three days". In direct response to this situation, the Massachusetts General Court enacted a quarantine requirement for all ships arriving at Boston Harbor from the West Indies, the first such measure in colonial America, to prevent the importation of "the plague, or like grievos [in]fectious disease" then raging in those parts.

A disease believed to be yellow fever was epidemic in Barbados in September 1647 and in Saint Kitts before and up to July 1648. Some authors have asserted that it was specifically these outbreaks (rather than some unidentifiable "plague") that prompted the Massachusetts quarantine measure, as the restrictions were lifted two years later, in May 1649, only once the yellow fever epidemic in those parts had subsided. In particular, some have drawn an explicit connection between Winthrop's account of "great mortality" in Barbados and Saint Kitts and the yellow fever then epidemic in that region. Ultimately, whatever the exact cause of the West Indies "plague", histories of influenza, typically citing either Hubbard or Webster, have maintained that outbreak as an extension of the influenza first reported in New England.

== Disease ==
=== Cause ===
The disease responsible for this outbreak is generally considered to have been influenza, though neither that name, nor the synonymous term "epidemic catarrh", was used at the time. The historian Daniel Neal called it a "malignant Fever"; Winthrop referred to it as an "epidemical sickness". It was, in any case, often likened to a cold.

Significant epidemics at this time were often attributed to supernatural influence and "regarded as disclosures of divine wrath," and such was the case with this one. The Puritan missionary John Eliot described the outbreak of this disease as "suddaine & generall, as if the Lord had immediately sent forth an angel, not [with] a sword to kill but [with] a rod to chastize, and he smot all, good & bad, old & young." Similarly, an order for a fast in Massachusetts the following year made reference to "the Lord's visitation generally through this country the last summer by an unknown disease."

Some more natural explanations for the outbreak were suggested, however. Neal, for example, attributed the appearance of this "malignant Fever" to "[t]he excessive Heats this Summer". Even this, though, inspired religious meditation, as Eliot reflected: "To have such colds in the height of the heat of summer shews us, [yet] in the height of the means of grace, peace liberty of ordinances &c yet may we then fall into malignant & mortal colds apostacys & coolings."

=== Signs and symptoms ===
Eliot described the disease as "a very depe cold, [with] some tincture of a feaver & full of malignity & very dangerous if not well regarded by keeping a low diet." Similarly, Winthrop describes it as seizing its victims "like a cold, and a light fever with it."

=== Effects ===
By modern standards, this epidemic could be considered "moderately severe"; to contemporary observers, it was reported to be "severe". However, these classifications are difficult to establish owing to a lack of reliable data. Entire towns were said to be attacked at once. It attacked apparently indiscriminately, afflicting "Indians and English, French and Dutch", with "but a few persons escaping it". Neither the young nor the old were spared. John Brock, a graduate of Harvard in the Class of 1646, remarked casually in his memorandum book for the year 1647, "Every body has gotten a Cold."

With respect to mortality, some differing reports exist. Neal states that the disease "carried off a great many People". Winthrop, on the other hand, notes that "few died," a fact that he attributes to "the mercy of God to his people"; accordingly, he reports that no more than 40 or 50 died in Massachusetts and similarly in Connecticut. Eliot reflects this suggestion in his comparison of the disease to an "angel" sent by God "to chastize" rather than "to kill". Nonetheless, it was apparently "especially fatal to pregnant women."

Its effects in Windsor, the home of Alse Young, can be seen in the town's mortality records. Between 1646 and 1647, the death rate more than quadrupled, from six to 27, an increase arguably attributable to the epidemic. Notably, the death rate remained elevated into the following year, at 25, before falling back down to four.

Some notable individuals are known to have died during this epidemic. These include Winthrop's own wife, Margaret Tyndal, who died on 14 June, and Congregational minister and founder of the Connecticut Colony, Thomas Hooker, who died on 7 July.

=== Treatment ===
In terms of apparently more successful treatments, taking "comfortable things" and "keeping a low diet" were considered beneficial. On the other hand, those who were "bled or used cooling drinks" were more likely to die.

== In literature ==
The epidemic is dramatized in the historical fiction novel One of Windsor: The Untold Story of America's First Witch Hanging by Beth M. Caruso, a cofounder of the Connecticut Witch Trial Exoneration Project. Caruso relied on historical records and "educated assumptions" to piece together a narrative of Alse Young's life, from her emigration from England in 1635 to her execution in Windsor in 1647.

== See also ==
- Massachusetts smallpox epidemic – An earlier colonial epidemic of the 17th century
- 1789–1790 influenza epidemic – The first influenza epidemic in the United States as a federation
- Timeline of influenza
- History of yellow fever
