= Deane Winthrop =

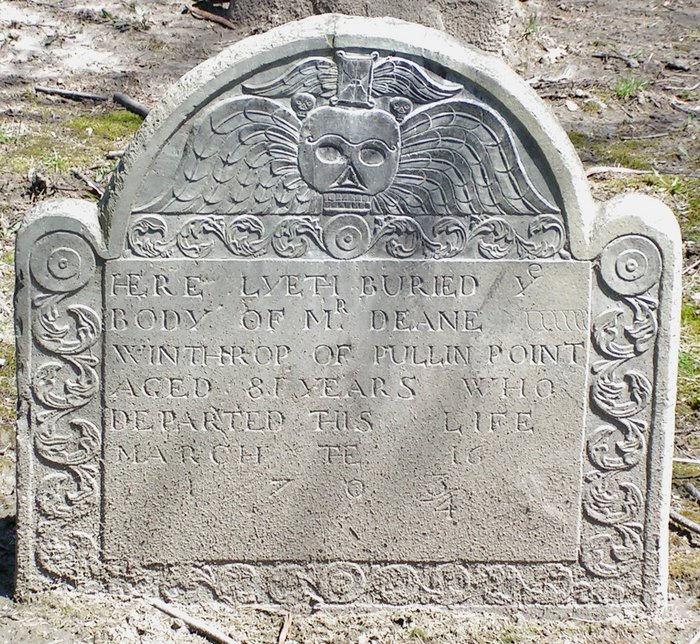
- Born: 23 March 1623; Groton, Suffolk, England
- Died: 16 March 1704 (aged 80); Pullen Point, Town of Boston, Province of Massachusetts Bay which is today Winthrop, Massachusetts
- Occupation: Farmer
- Known for: Sixth son of Governor John Winthrop and an early settler of what is now the Town of Winthrop, Massachusetts
- Spouse(s): Sarah Glover, Martha Mellows

Deane Winthrop (23 March 1623 – 16 March 1704) was the sixth son (the third son by his father's third marriage) of the English Puritan colonist John Winthrop, a founder and the 2nd, 6th, 9th and 12th Governor of the Massachusetts Bay Colony. His mother was Margaret Tyndal. He was named after his mother's half-brother, Sir John Deane. He outlived all of his full and half-siblings. There is no known portrait of him.

Deane was born in the village of Groton in Suffolk, England. At the age of 12, he departed London, England with his older brother John Winthrop the Younger, age 29, on the ship the Abigail in July 1635. He later settled and farmed in an area of the Town of Boston known as Pullen Point (Pulling Point), part of the area known to the native Massachusett tribe as Winnisimmet, which is today the Town of Winthrop, Massachusetts.

== Plantation of Groton ==
In the 1650s, he was involved in the project of settlement in the Nashoba Valley that became known as the Plantation of Groton (1655), named in honor of his birthplace where his father, John Winthrop, was Lord of the manor. The area of the Plantation today comprises the Massachusetts towns of Groton, Ayer, almost all of Pepperell and Shirley, large parts of Dunstable, Littleton, and Tyngsborough plus smaller parts of Harvard and Westford, as well as Nashua, New Hampshire and Hollis, New Hampshire. Deane served as one of the original selectmen of the settlement, but his permanent residence was always Pullen Point.

== Deane Winthrop House ==
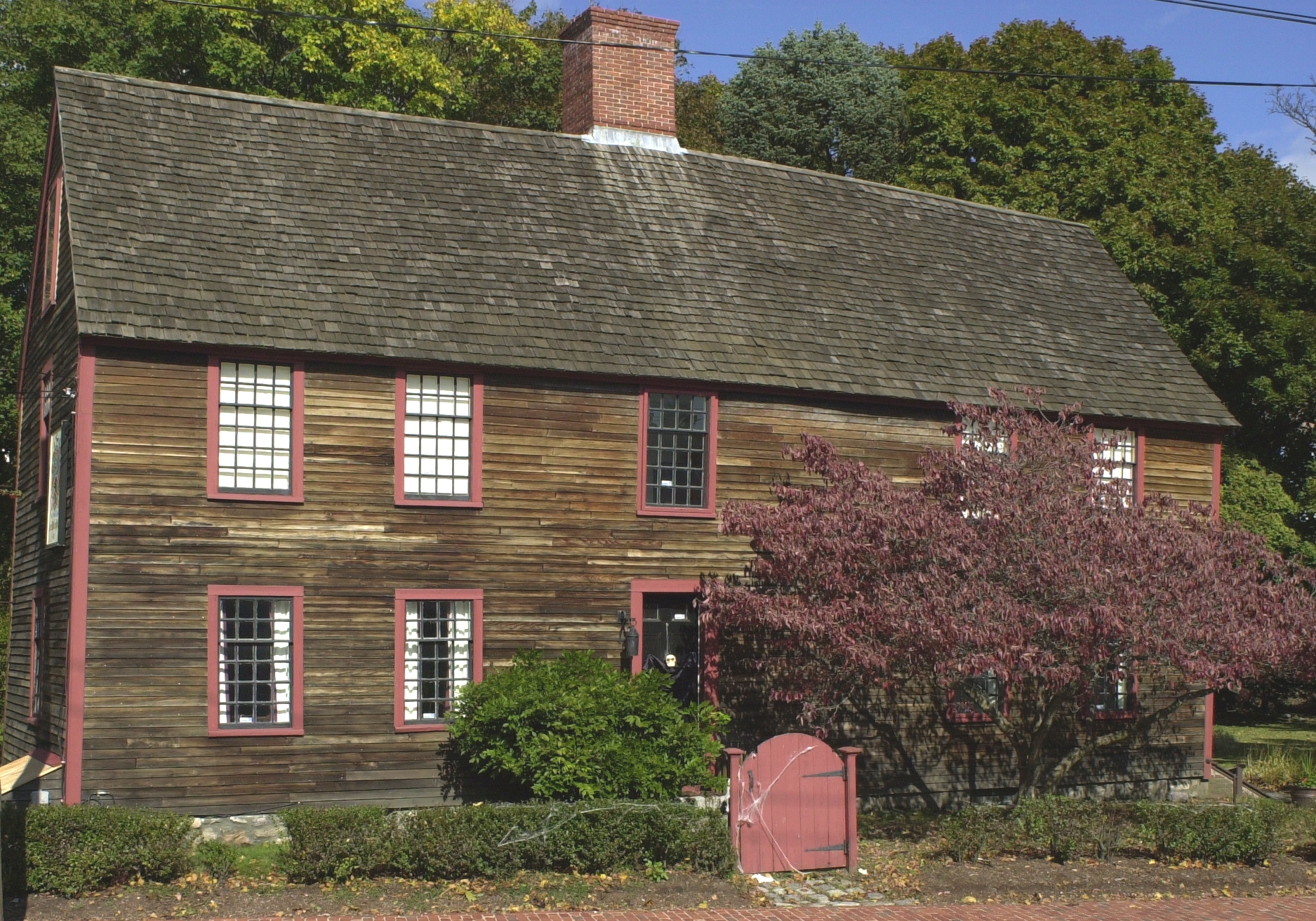
Dean Winthrop House (1675)

The Deane Winthrop House located in what is now Winthrop, Massachusetts is the site of Deane's first house. The land of the site was first granted in 1637 to Captain William Pierce (1595–1641), a renowned mariner and slave trader. Pierce (also spelled Peirce, Pearce, Pearse, etc. in various records) built a house on his land sometime after 1638. Deane acquired the house with its farm in 1647. He later rebuilt most of the house in 1675. This house is still intact and is maintained as a both a single family home and a museum. It is one of the oldest extant wood frame houses in the country. It is also the oldest continuously inhabited house in the United States.

== Personal life ==
Like most settlers in the Massachusetts Bay Colony, Deane was a Puritan Christian who dissented from certain practices retained by the Church of England. At the age of 25, he married Sarah Glover (1629–1684), daughter of the Rev. Jose Glover, and sister of his brother Adam Winthrop's wife in 1648. They had nine children together: Deane (b. 15 June 1651, died in infancy); Deane, again, (b. 6 Sept. 1653, died young); John (b. 1655, died young); Sarah (b. 11 February 1657); Margaret (b. 25 July 1660) who married Jotham Grover and had children; Elizabeth (b. 9 July 1663) who married Captain Samuel Kent and had children; Jose (b. 3 May 1666., d. 15 November 1702, aged 36, no children); Priscilla (b. 1 May 1669) who married Eliab Adams and had children; Mercy (b. 18 January 1673) who married Atherton Hough on 11 January 1700 and had children.

Deane's first wife, Sarah, died in 1684 at the age of about 55. In the same year, at the age of 61, he married Martha Mellows (1625–1716), aged 59. She was the widow of Captain John Mellows (or Mellhouse) of Boston. Deane also owned three slaves of African origin. They are mentioned by name in his will of 1702 as: Marrear, Primas, and a child named Robbin.

Deane died on 16 March 1704 at age 80 in Pullen Point. He was buried on 20 March in the Rumney Marsh Burying Ground which is located in what is today Revere, Massachusetts and is still maintained. Samuel Sewall (1652–1730) attended the funeral. Sewall was a prominent judge, businessman, and printer in Massachusetts Bay Colony. He is notorious for his involvement in the Salem Witch Trials of 1692–1693 (for which he later apologized). He provides this account of Deane Winthrop's burial in his diary:

"March 16, 1703/4 Mr Deane Winthrop, of Pulling Point, dies upon his Birthday, just about the Breaking of it. He was Taken at eight aclock the evening before, as he sat in his chair, sunk first, being set up, he vomited, complained of his head, which were almost his last words. Hardly spake anything after his being in bed. 81 years old. He is the last of Govr Winthrop's children... statione novissimus exit. March 20. is buried at Pulling Point by his son and three Daughters. [Pall] Bearers [were] Russel, Cooke; Hutchinson, Sewall; Townsend, Paige. From the House of Hasey. Scutcheons on the Pall. I help'd lower the Corps into the Grave. Madam Paige went in her Coach. Majr. Genl. and Capt. Adam Winthrop had Scarvs, and led the widow. Very pleasant day; went by Winnisimmet."

Sewall quotes a Latin phrase from Ovid in his Metamorphoses 2.115 " ...statione novissimus exit." This translates as "he, last of all, leaves his station." The "he" in Ovid's poem refers to the Morning Star (Venus) disappearing at dawn. This is an allusion to Deane as the last child of John Winthrop to die. There were six pall bearers (in pairs on either side of the casket) mentioned by surname. The "scutcheons" mentioned on the funeral pall over the casket refer to his coat of arms inherited from his father (see entry below). Deane's "son" that Sewall refers to may have been Deane's stepson, a son of Martha and her first husband, as none of Deane's biological sons survived childhood except Jose. Jose however died two years before Dean not having fathered children. Deane's descendants survive only in the female line.

His widow and second wife, Martha, died just under 12 years later in Boston on 22 January 1716, aged 90.

== Coat of arms ==
This was the coat of arms used by John Winthrop, Second Governor of the Massachusetts Bay Colony, and his sons. It was presumably confirmed by the College of Arms, London, to his paternal uncle in 1592.

Deane Winthrop used the same coat of arms as his father John Winthrop as displayed here. These arms appear today on the Deane Winthrop House and are also used as the coat of arms for Winthrop House at Harvard University. The heraldic blazon of arms is: Argent three chevronels Gules overall a lion rampant Sable.

== Name of the Town of Winthrop ==
The Town of Winthrop, Massachusetts was incorporated in 1852 after separating from what was then known as North Chelsea and is today known as Revere, Massachusetts. It is a long-standing and understandable myth that the town was named in honor of Deane Winthrop, who resided in what is now the town for his entire adult life. However, while his presence in what is now the Town of Winthrop may have influenced its naming when it incorporated, the town is in fact named after his far more famous father, John Winthrop, as the town's website also confirms.
