= Asa Cummings =

American minister and author

The Reverend Asa Cummings
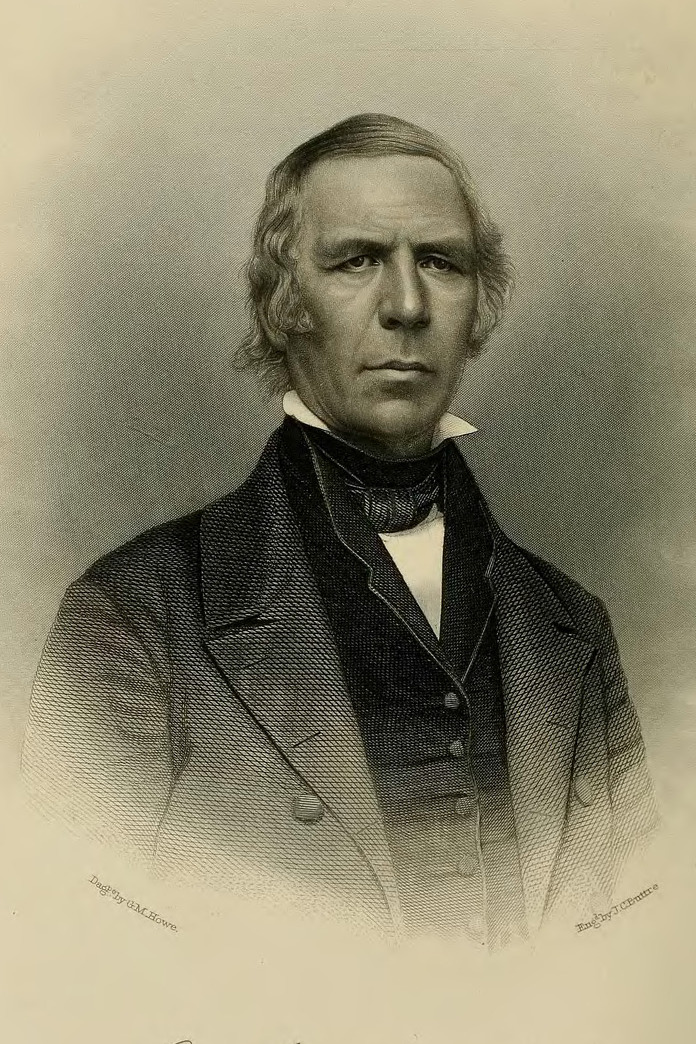
- Cummings pictured late in his life
- Born: September 29, 1790; Andover, Massachusetts, U.S.
- Died: June 5, 1856 (aged 65); Caribbean Sea
- Occupation: Minister
- Years active: 1821–1856; his death

Asa Cummings (September 29, 1790 – June 5, 1856) was an American Congregational minister and author. He was ordained into the ministry of the First Congregational Church in North Yarmouth, Maine, in 1821. He wrote a well-respected memoir of Reverend Edward Payson in 1828.

== Early life ==
Cummings was born in 1790 in Andover, Massachusetts, to Asa Cummings and Phebe Johnson.

He graduated from Harvard College in 1817, before studying at Andover Theological Seminary in his hometown. He graduated from there in 1820. He also taught in Western Danvers, Massachusetts, and at Bowdoin College in Maine, for a short period.

== Career ==
In 1821, Cummings was ordained minister at the First Congregational Church in North Yarmouth, Maine, a role in which he remained for four years. He continued as honorary pastor there until 1829, when he retired due to ill health.

Shortly after the end of his full-time ministerial role in North Yarmouth, Cummings relocated to nearby Portland, where he became editor of the "prestigious" Christian Mirror between 1826 and 1855. Cummings owned it until 1833, when it became the property of the Maine Missionary Society; he was retained as editor. In 1828, he wrote a memoir of Reverend Edward Payson, who died the previous year and of whom he was an intimate friend, which was published by the American Tract Society.

== Personal life ==
In the first half of the 19th century, Cummings's portrait was painted by Charles Octavius Cole. The portrait is in the possession of Portland Public Library and is in the art inventories catalog at Smithsonian American Art Museums in Washington, D.C. A letter he wrote to William Fogg in 1840 is in the inventory of Boston Public Library.

Cummings's fourth son and sixth child, Ralph Wardlaw Cummings (1832–1880), became a physician and edited and published The Maine Medical and Surgical Journal.

== Death ==
Cummings died in 1856, aged 65, after falling sick while at sea aboard the steamship SS George Law, on his way home from Aspinwall, Panama. His daughter, Hannah (1824–1879), and her husband, Reverend Joseph Rowell (1820–1918), were also on board. He was buried in the Caribbean Sea, but has a memorial in Evergreen Cemetery in Portland.

=== Legacy ===
Cummings's son, Edward, named Cummings Street, in Portland's Back Cove neighborhood, after his father.
