= Henry Carmichael =

American physician

- Carmichael pictured around 1910
- Born: March 5, 1846; Brooklyn, New York, U.S.
- Died: January 28, 1924 (aged 77); Malden, Massachusetts, U.S.

Henry Carmichael (March 5, 1846 – January 28, 1924) was an American physician, professor and inventor. He was a consulting chemical engineer for 37 years and a professor of chemistry at various colleges around the United States. He also created the Carmichael process of handling copper ore and developed a commercial method of separating common salt into chlorine and caustic soda via the use of electricity.

== Early life ==
Carmichael was born in 1846 in Brooklyn, New York, to Daniel Carmichael and Eliza Otis. His father, who was a scientist, inventor and railroad builder, died aged 53, when Carmichael was three years old. His mother was the niece of his father's first wife, Almira, who died in 1831.

He graduated from Amherst College in 1867, after which he studied at the University of Göttingen in Germany, where he received a PhD.

== Career ==
Carmichael's first role was as Professor of Chemistry at Iowa College in 1875. A year later, he fulfilled the same role at Bowdoin College in Brunswick, Maine. He was also an assayer for the State of Maine. While at Bowdoin, Carmichael created a practical invention for the manufacturing of fibreware. What was named "indurated fibre" was used in the manufacturing of pails and tubs and suchlike.

In 1886, after ten years at Bowdoin, Carmichael left to become a consultant in chemistry in Boston, a role in which he remained for almost forty years. It was there that he created the Carmichael process of handling copper ore which contributed to the success of many mines. He also devised a process, widely used for a period thereafter, for charging soda-fountain tanks with carbonic acid gas. Another process he devised was a commercial method of separating common salt into chlorine and caustic soda by means of electricity.

In 1904, he established a patent for apparatus for capping bottles as assignor to Static Carbonating Company in New York City.

== Personal life ==
Carmichael's wife, Anne Darling Cole, was a composer, writer and artist. She was a daughter of the artist Charles Octavius Cole.

== Death ==
Carmichael died at his home, "the Arches," on Highland Terrace in Malden, Massachusetts, in 1924, aged 77.
