= Elizabeth Prentiss =

American author (1818–1878)

Drawing of Elizabeth Prentiss from the frontispiece of The Life and Letters of Elizabeth Prentiss

Elizabeth Payson Prentiss (October 26, 1818 – August 13, 1878) was an American author, well known for her hymn "More Love to Thee, O Christ" and the religious novel Stepping Heavenward (1869). Her writings enjoyed renewed popularity in the late 20th century.

== Early years ==
Elizabeth Payson was born in Portland, Maine, United States, the fifth of eight children (only six survived infancy) of the eminent Congregationalist pastor Edward Payson. The influences of New England Christianity, consisting of the inherited Puritan foundation with added evangelistic, missional, and philanthropic elements, were evident in the Payson family. The family gathered for prayer three times a day. Elizabeth was deeply impacted by the death of her father, who had suffered from tuberculosis for over a year, on October 22, 1827. The family moved to New York City in 1831, and in May of that year, Elizabeth made a public profession of faith in Jesus Christ and joined the Bleecker Street Presbyterian Church.

From an early age, Elizabeth exhibited sharp mental abilities, deep and ready sympathy, and an exceptional perceptiveness. By age 16, Elizabeth had become a regular contributor of stories and poems to "The Youth's Companion," a New England religious periodical.

== Career ==
In 1838, she opened a small girls' school in her home and took up a Sabbath-school class as well. Two years later, she left for Richmond, Virginia, to be a department head at a girls' boarding school.

In 1845, she married George Lewis Prentiss, a brother of her close friend Anna Prentiss Stearns. The Prentisses settled in New Bedford, Massachusetts, where George became pastor of South Trinitarian Church. After a happy time of transitioning into the duties of a pastor's wife and a housewife, in 1852 she lost, within a period of three months, her second and third children – one as a newborn, one at age four.

In 1851, George Prentiss became the pastor of Mercer Street Presbyterian Church in New York City. Though Elizabeth struggled with chronic health problems, she went on to have three more healthy children. Little Little Lou's Sayings and Doings, published in 1868, included her poem "Mr. Nobody" which went on to become a children's classic. The poem is often mistakenly attributed to "anonymous" or the later poet Walter de la Mare. Her first book of stories, Little Susy's Six Birthdays, written in just ten days, was published in 1853. In 1856, following the nearly fatal illness of her daughter Minnie, she wrote the hymn "More Love to Thee."

After George Prentiss resigned from his church in New York because of failing health, the family went abroad to Europe for a couple of years. In 1860, they returned to New York, where George resumed his pastorate and held a chair at Union Theological Seminary. Stepping Heavenward, Elizabeth Prentiss's most popular book, was published in installments by the Chicago Advance in 1869.

The family eventually settled in Dorset, Vermont, where Elizabeth would die in 1878 at the age of 59. Her hymn "More Love to Thee" was sung at her funeral. After her death, George Prentiss published The Life and Letters of Elizabeth Prentiss (1882), citing his wife's words in the book's preface: "Much of my experience of life has cost me a great price and I wish to use it for strengthening and comforting other souls."

Elizabeth Prentiss had six children, of whom four survived infancy:

- Annie (b. 1845)
- Eddy (1848–1852)
- Bessie (1852–1852)
- Minnie (b. 1854)
- George (b. 1857)
- Henry (b. 1859)

== Selected works ==
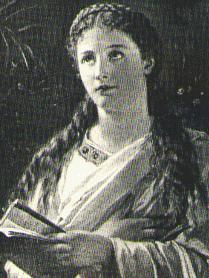
Image from the cover of Thoughts Concerning the King (1890)

- Little Susy's Six Birthdays, 1853
- Only a Dandelion, and other Stories, 1854
- Henry and Bessie: or, What they did in the Country, 1855
- Little Susy's Six Teachers, 1856
- The Flower of the Family: A Book for Girls, 1856
- Peterchen and Gretchen; or, Tales of Early Childhood, 1860
- The Little Preacher, 1867
- Little Threads; or, Tangle Thread, Silver Thread, and Golden Thread, 1863
- Little Lou's Sayings and Doings, 1868
- Fred and Maria and Me, 1868
- The Old Brown Pitcher, 1868
- Stepping Heavenward, 1869
- Nidworth, and his three Magic Wands, 1869
- The Percys, or, Ever Heavenward or, Toward Heaven or, A Mothers Influence 1870
- The Story Lizzie Told, 1870
- Six Little Princesses and what they turned into, 1871
- Aunt Jane's Hero, 1871
- Golden Hours: Hymns and Songs of the Christian Life, 1873
- Aunt Jane's Hero, 1873
- Urbane and His Friends, 1874
- Griselda: A Dramatic Poem in Five Acts, 1876 (trans. from the German by Friedrich Halm)
- The Home at Greylock, 1876
- Pemaquid; a Story of Old Times in New England, 1877
- Gentleman Jim, 1878
- Avis Benson; or, Mine and Thine, with other Sketches, 1879
