= Daniel Carmichael (scientist) =

American scientist

- Born: June 10, 1796; New Jersey, U.S.
- Died: September 3, 1849 (aged 53); Philadelphia, Pennsylvania, U.S.
- Occupation: Scientist

Daniel Carmichael (June 10, 1796 – September 3, 1849) was an American scientist. He was the contractor for several projects in the United States and Canada, including the construction of the Boston and Providence Railroad and the widening of the Welland Canal.

== Early life ==
Carmichael was born in New Jersey in 1796 to Ebenezer Carmichael and Olive Tracy.

== Career ==
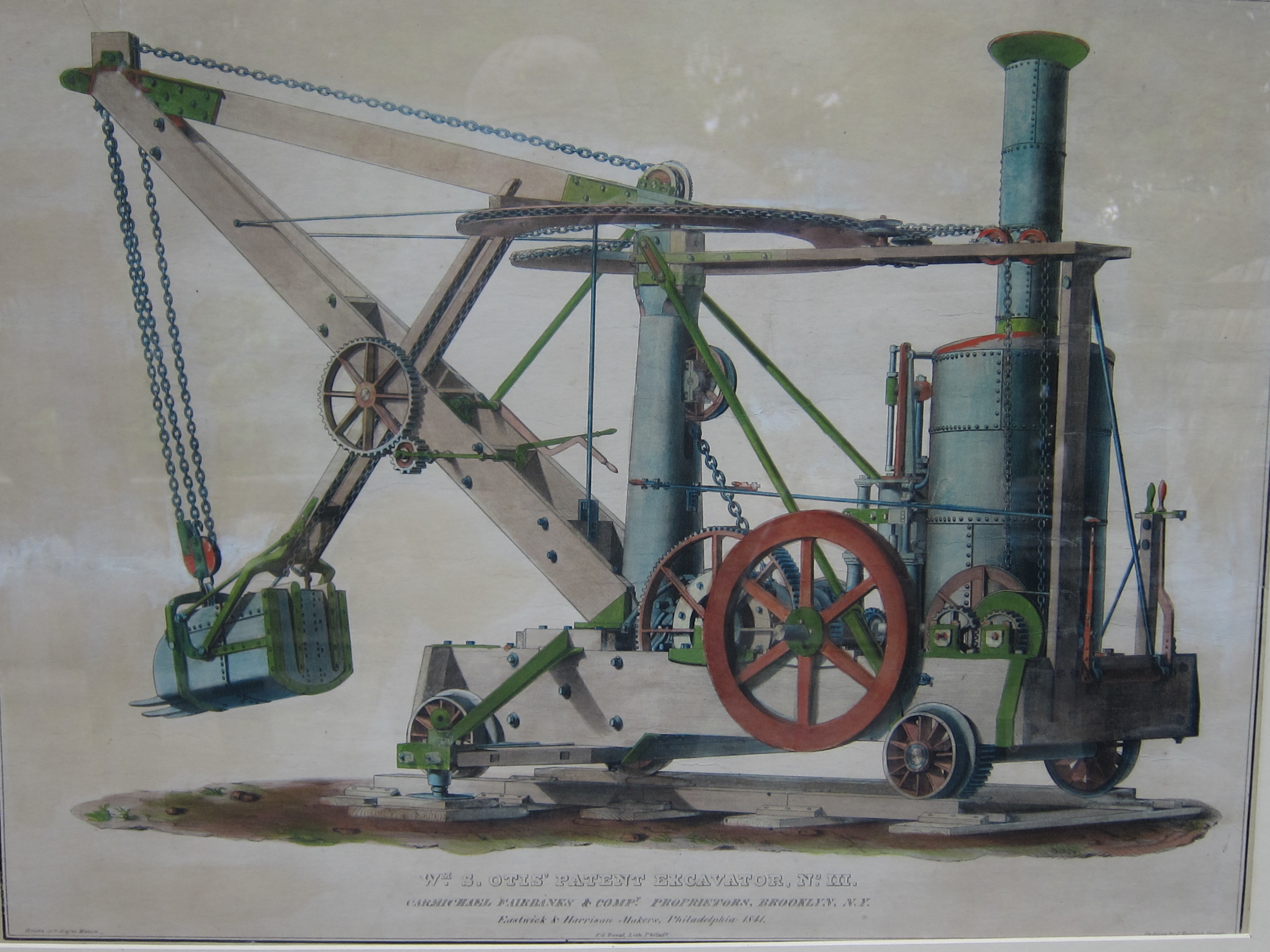
Otis steam shovel (1841)

Carmichael became a contractor with partner Reuben Fairbanks, under the name Carmichael and Fairbanks, which was based in Philadelphia, Pennsylvania. The firm became successful in the construction of railroads, including the Boston and Providence Railroad in 1835. They hired William Otis, a young engineer who was also Carmichael's brother-in-law. Otis invented the Otis steam shovel, the first successful steam excavator, while working with the partnership, which became Carmichael, Fairbanks and Otis. Otis died of typhoid in 1839, aged 26.

In 1838, the firm began building the Western Railroad between Springfield and Worcester, Massachusetts.

In the 1840s and 1850s, Carmichael and Charles French were the contractors for the widening of the Welland Canal in Ontario, Canada. Carmichael was also believed to be the owner of two of Otis's shovels during his work as a contractor on the Atlantic Docks project in Brooklyn, New York, in the 1840s.

In 1846, Carmichael and Jason C. Osgood established a patent for a dredge for use with the Osgood Dredge Company of Troy, New York. The firm supplied several steam shovels for the initial attempt at contstructing the Panama Canal.

== Personal life ==
Carmichael married Almira Otis, who died in 1831. The following year, he married Eliza Otis, Almira's niece. One of their children, Henry, became a noted physician.

== Death ==
Carmichael died in 1849, aged 53, three years after the birth of Henry. He had written his will 24 hours earlier. He was interred in the vaults of the Central Presbyterian Church in Philadelphia. A stone marker was erected in New Vernon Cemetery in Mamakating, New York. Eliza was left a widow with six children.
