= Charles Octavius Cole =

American painter

- Born: July 1, 1814; Newburyport, Massachusetts, U.S.
- Died: February 14, 1858 (aged 43); Portland, Maine, U.S.
- Resting place: Western Cemetery
- Known for: Painting
- Style: Portraiture

Charles Octavius Cole (July 1, 1814 – February 14, 1858) was an American painter. Born in Massachusetts, he spent spent much of his life in Maine, where he was regarded as Portland's most eminent painter during his time in the city. Although he was known as a portrait painter, he did produce some landscape paintings. Cole's portrait of Henry Wadsworth Longfellow is on display in Portland's Wadsworth-Longfellow House, while his Imperial Knob and Gorge: White Mountains of New Hampshire oil-on-canvas landscape is in the possession of Brooklyn Museum in New York City.

== Early life ==
Cole was born in 1814 in Newburyport, Massachusetts. His father, Bordeaux native Moses Dupré Cole (1783–1849), was a sign painter and portraitist in that town.

== Career ==
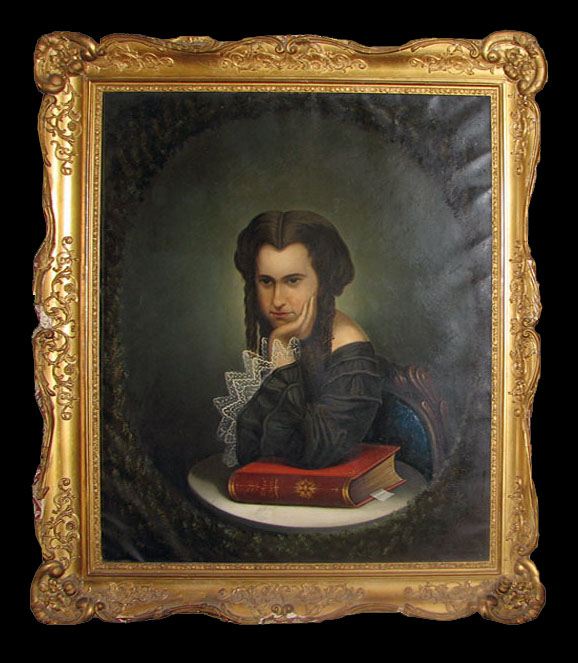
Cole's portrait of Elizabeth Bourne (1856)

Between 1838 and 1842, Cole worked in New Orleans, where he was coined a "Plantation Baroque painter", before moving to Portland, Maine, where he remained until around 1856.

His portrait of Portland minister Revd. Asa Cummings is in the possession of Portland Public Library and is in the art inventories catalog at Smithsonian American Art Museums in Washington, D.C., while his unfinished portrait of Henry Wadsworth Longfellow is on display in the Wadsworth-Longfellow House in Portland. Cole also gifted Longfellow "a painting of great merit" of waxworker Patience Wright.

== Personal life ==
Cole married Mary B. Smith, with whom he had three children. Daughter Annie Darling married Dr. Henry Carmichael, an analytical and consulting chemist from New York City.

== Death ==
Cole died of tuberculosis in 1858, aged 43. He was interred in Portland's Western Cemetery.
