= Phillips Payson =

- Born: February 29, 1704; Dorchester, Suffolk County, Province of Massachusetts Bay
- Died: January 11, 1801 (aged 96); Walpole, Norfolk County, Massachusetts
- Education: A.B., Harvard College
- Spouse: Anne Swift
- Children: Samuel Phillips Payson (1736–1801)
- Parent(s): Samuel Payson, Mary Wiswall
- Congregations served: Dorchester, then Walpole
- Title: Reverend

Phillips Payson (1704–1801) was an American Congregationalist minister for the town of Walpole, Province of Massachusetts Bay. He is the ancestor of many clergymen of New England.

== Biography ==
Rev. Phillips Payson was born 29 February 1704 and baptized 12 March 1704 in Dorchester, Suffolk County, Province of Massachusetts Bay, the son of Rev. Samuel Payson (d. 24 November 1721) and his wife Mary, the daughter of Elder Thomas Wiswall. The Payson family originated from Nazeing, England, first settling in the Massachusetts Bay Colony as early as 1635.

The Reverend is not the same person as his first cousin Phillips Payson who died young, the son of his uncle Rev. Edward Payson (d. 22 Aug 1732) and Elizabeth Phillips (b. 2 August 1665, dau. of Rev. Samuel Phillips, m. 7 November 1683, d. 1 October 1724).

He received an A.B. from Harvard College in 1724. He was an American Congregationalist minister in his home town of Dorchester from 1728. He competed for the position of senior minister, was one of three finalists at First Parish Church of Dorchester in 1729, but was not selected for ordination. Thereafter he was ordained the minister for the town of Walpole. On 17 November 1733 in Walpole, Suffolk County (since 1793 in Norfolk County), he married Anne Swift.

The people of the town of Walpole were integral to the cause of liberty before and during the American Revolution. George Payson who served as a delegate of a Committee of Correspondence was possibly one of his sons.

By his wife Anne Swift, his children included:

- Phillips Payson a.k.a. Samuel Phillips Payson, H.C. 1754, D.D.
- Seth Payson, H.C. 1777, D.D., who was father of:
  - Edward Payson, H. C. 1803, D. D., minister of Portland, Maine. In 1834, twenty-two of his name, says Farmer, had been graduates at Harvard, Yale and Dartmouth. Seven of the thirteen from Harvard were clergy.

Rev. Phillips Payson is buried in the Rumney Marsh Burying Ground in Revere, Massachusetts.
