= Edward Payson =

American preacher (1783–1827)

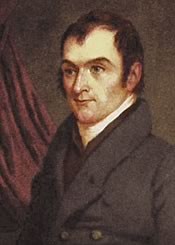
Edward Payson.

Edward Payson (July 25, 1783 – October 22, 1827) was an American Congregational preacher.

== Early life ==
Payson was born in Rindge, New Hampshire, in 1783 to Reverend Seth Payson (1758–1820), pastor of the town's Congregational Church, and Grata Strong (1757–1827). His uncle, Phillips Payson (1736–1801), pastor of a church in Chelsea, Massachusetts, was a physicist and astronomer.

He graduated from Harvard College in 1803, was then principal of a school at Portland, Maine, and in 1807 became junior pastor of the Congregational Church at Portland, where he remained, after 1811, as senior pastor.

The most complete collection of his sermons, with a memoir by Asa Cummings originally published in 1828, is the Memoir, Select Thoughts and Sermons of the late Rev. Edward Payson (3 vols., Portland, 1846; Philadelphia, 1859). Based on this is the volume, Mementos of Edward Payson (New York, 1873), by the Rev. E. L. Janes of the Methodist Episcopal Church.

== Personal life ==
Payson married Ann Louisa Shipman (1784–1848), a native of New Haven, Connecticut, with whom he had eight known children, including Elizabeth Prentiss.

== Death ==
Payson died in Portland in 1827, aged 44. He was interred in the city's Evergreen Cemetery. Archibald Alexander suggested in 1844 that "no man in our country has left behind him a higher character for eminent piety than the Rev. Edward Payson."
