= Deane Winthrop House =

Historic house in Massachusetts, United States

- U.S. National Register of Historic Places
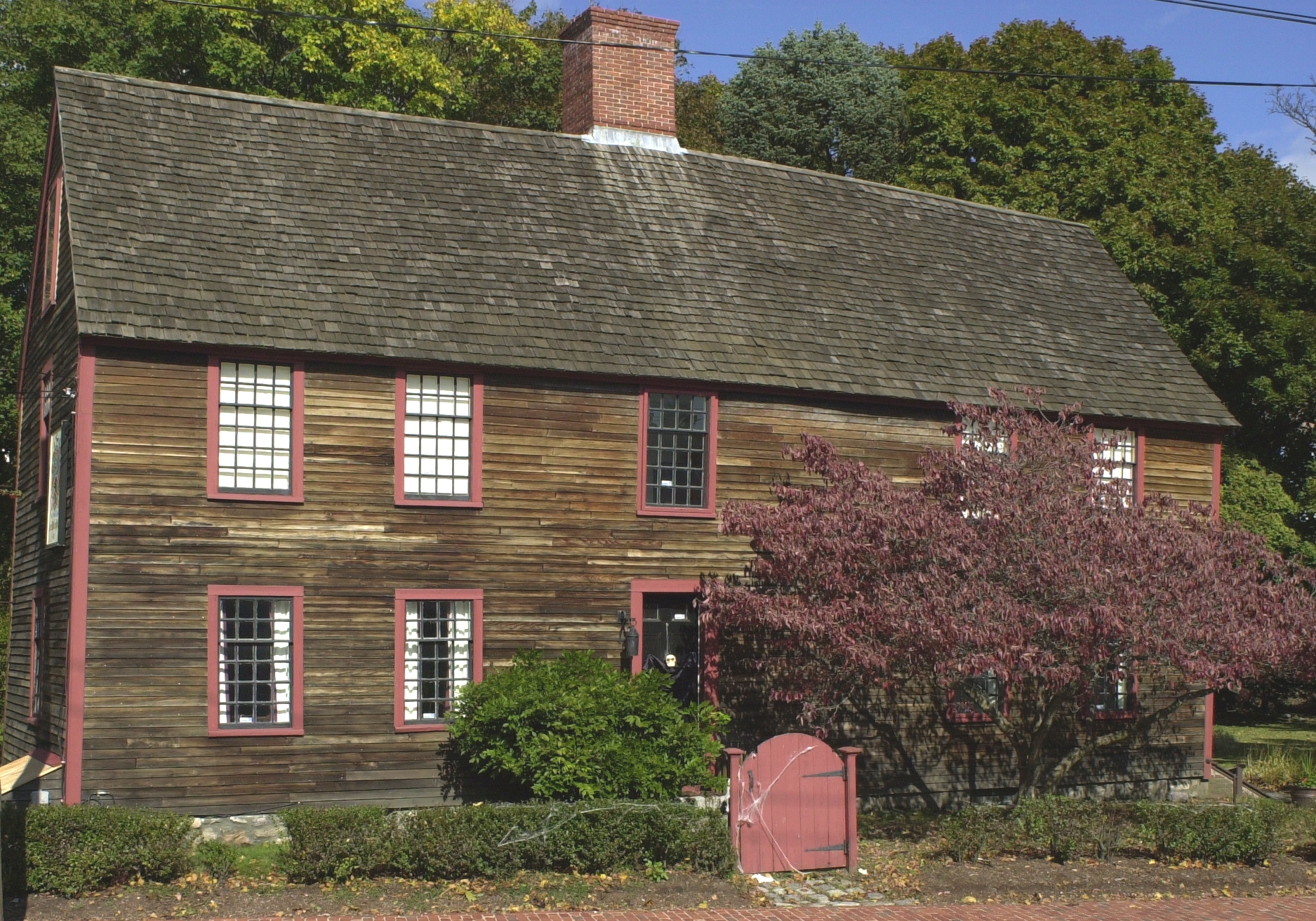

- Location within Massachusetts Location within the United States
- Location: 34 Shirley St., Winthrop, Massachusetts
- Coordinates: 42°22′57″N 70°58′42″W
- Area: less than one acre
- Built: 1675
- Architectural style: Colonial, First Period
- MPS: First Period Buildings of Eastern Massachusetts TR
- NRHP reference No.: 90000162
- Added to NRHP: March 09, 1990

The Deane Winthrop House is an historic house at 34 Shirley Street in Winthrop, Massachusetts. Deane Winthrop (1623–1704) was the sixth son of the second colonial governor of the Massachusetts Bay Colony, John Winthrop.

The oldest part of the house was built about 1675 with an addition made in 1696. It is currently owned by the Winthrop Improvement and Historical Association and is open to visitors by appointment. This building is one of the oldest wood frame houses in the country and is the oldest continuously lived in home in the United States. The house was added to the National Register of Historic Places in 1990. In 2009, an addition was made to the barn to store Winthrop Improvement and Historical Association artifacts and documents. Originally thought to have been constructed earlier, a dendrochronology survey of the tree rings in 2002 confirmed that the earliest part of the house was built in 1675.

== Coat of arms ==
The coat of arms of Governor John Winthrop and his sons.

The coat of arms displayed on the Deane Winthrop House are the arms of Deane's father, Governor John Winthrop, and thus it was also used by his sons. The Winthrop coat of arms is additionally used by Winthrop House at Harvard University. The arms were reportedly confirmed by the College of Arms, London, to Governor Winthrop's paternal uncle in 1592. The heraldic blazon of arms is: Argent three chevronels Gules overall a lion rampant Sable.

== See also ==
- List of the oldest buildings in Massachusetts
- National Register of Historic Places listings in Suffolk County, Massachusetts
