= Margaret Tyndal Winthrop =

Margaret Tyndal Winthrop (c. 1591 – 14 June 1647) was a 17th-century Puritan, the wife of John Winthrop, the first governor of the Massachusetts Bay Colony. The pair are notable for the survival and character of the love letters which they wrote to each other.

== Life ==
Margaret Tyndal was born into an Essex gentry family: her father Sir John Tyndal was a Master of the Court of Chancery, and her mother Anne Egerton was related to several of the leading Puritan clergy of the time; Anne was the sister of Stephen Egerton, who in turn married Sarah, daughter of Thomas Crooke. Both Egerton and Crooke belonged to "the Godly elite", the predominant Puritan faction in the 1570s and 1580s. Margaret was taught to read and write, and encouraged to habits of study and piety. Her aunt Sarah, widow of Stephen Egerton, left her £100, a very considerable sum at the time, when she died in 1624.

Margaret married John Winthrop at Great Maplestead in Essex on 29 April 1618, becoming his third wife. She moved to the estate of John Winthrop's father, Groton Manor in Suffolk, helping him manage the household while her husband was away working in London. Many of their love letters to each other—in which the couple put their love of God before their love of each other—have survived.

John Winthrop sailed for New England in 1630, while Margaret remained in England for a year to wrap up family business. "Prior to parting, the two agreed to set aside five to six o'clock every Monday and Friday to think of one another and enter into spiritual communion with each other till the time they were reunited." Margaret arrived in New England on 2 November 1631, having sailed on the Lyon, and was admitted to Boston church as member #111. She and John Winthrop had eight children: Stephen, Adam, Deane, Nathaniel, Samuel, Anne, William, and Sarah.

Margaret died in Boston on 14 June 1647, aged about fifty-six, during an influenza epidemic. Despite their deep mutual affection, John chose to make a fourth marriage to Martha Rainsborough, sister of Thomas Rainsborough, but he outlived Margaret by less than 2 years.
