= Great Maplestead =

Village in Essex, England

Coordinates: 51.981°N 0.631°E

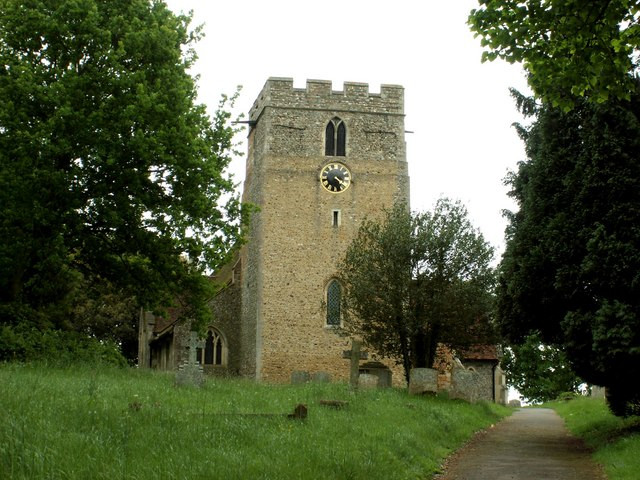
- St. Giles' Church

- Location within Essex
- Population: 385 (Parish, 2021)
- Civil parish: Braintree
- Shire county: Essex
- Region: East
- Country: England
- Sovereign state: United Kingdom
- Post town: Halstead
- Postcode district: CO9
- Dialling code: 01787
- Police: Essex
- Fire: Essex
- Ambulance: East of England

Great Maplestead is a village and civil parish in the Braintree district of Essex, England. At the 2021 census the parish had a population of 385.

In the sixteenth century the Deane family were Lords of the Manor of Great Maplestead. Later in the century the manor passed by marriage to Sir John Tyndal, Master of the Court of Chancery. It was here in 1618 that Tyndal's daughter Margaret Tyndal Winthrop married John Winthrop, a crucial figure in the founding of Massachusetts.

In the 1870s the Imperial Gazetteer of England and Wales said that Great Maplestead "took its name from maple trees, which anciently flourished on or around its site; and has the repute of being a very healthy place".

== Location ==
This village is located in the north of Essex, which is in the South East of England, and is near the town of Halstead and the villages of Sible Hedingham and Little Maplestead. The closest city to Great Maplestead is Colchester. There is a distance of 46.501 miles (74.836 km) between London and Great Maplestead. The village covers 1,892 acres (766 ha) of land and is located 1-mile (1.6 km) to the north-east of the Colne Valley railway, and also the River Colne.

== Population ==
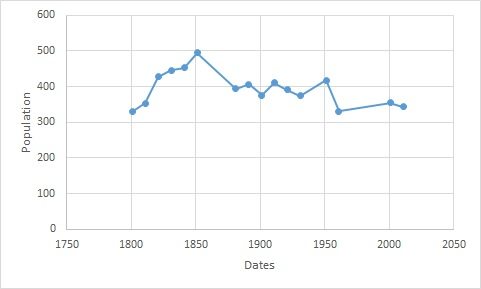
Total population of Great Maplestead Civil Parish, Essex, as reported by the Census of Population from 1801 to 2011

It had a population of 343 according to the 2011 census. The population over the last 50 years has remained stable, with Great Maplestead having a population of 331 in 1961. The population of Great Maplestead has not dramatically varied since the census taken in 1801, to the one taken in 2011. The population in 1801 was 331, the same as in 1961, and only a small difference in the population from 2011. However, there have been some fluctuations that have occurred through time. Between 1801 and 1851 there was a steady increase in the population until it reached its highest recorded population of 494 in 1851. Between this time and 1881 Great Maplestead experienced a significant decrease, with the population dropping to 394. From 1881 onwards the population remained at a relatively constant rate with no dramatic changes.

=== Housing ===
In 1831 there was a recorded 88 houses, this links to the changing population as the number of houses began to rise, with the highest number being 111 households in 1851, with 105 of these occupied and six vacant. 1851 was also the year with the highest recorded population. Over the next couple of decades the number of households declined, also seeing the highest number of vacant houses, with there being the highest number of 14 in 1881. However the housing rate again increased in the mid twentieth century.

== Employment ==
A graph to show the occupations of the Great Maplestead population in 2011.

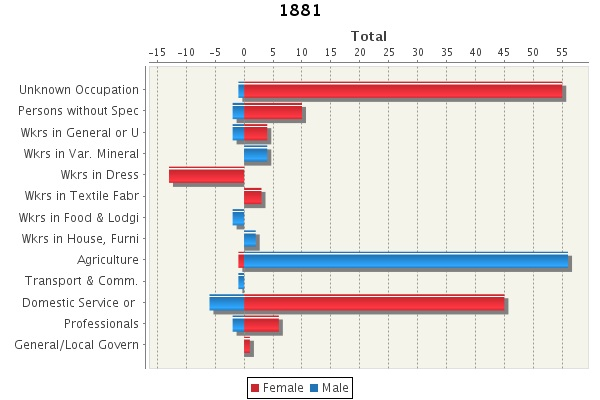
A graph to show occupation data for 1881 in Great Maplestead.

Employment in Great Maplestead has changed significantly between 1881 and 2011, with the most change shown in the change in occupation over the years. In 1881 there were a high number of occupations that were unknown, with 55 females having an unknown occupation. Whereas in 2011, 172 residents were recorded in Great Maplestead aged between 16 and 74 in employment. Great Maplestead's largest sectors in 1881 were mainly primary and secondary, representative of the time. A high proportion of the population were employed in agriculture, with around 57 males working in this sector. Other popular occupations in 1881 were domestics and textile workers, with 45 females working within households performing domestic services. Employment in Great Maplestead differs in 2011 as the sectors of work have changed significantly, with employment being more heavily based in the tertiary sector. Around 95 people in Great Maplestead have a job as managers, directors, senior officials, associate, technical, administrative and secretarial roles. Over time the main occupations of the population have moved away from the primary and secondary role, towards occupations such as these, with a large proportion of Great Maplestead involved within such occupations. However the 'skilled trade' sector in 2011, like manual workers have a relatively large number of people, around 30, working in this sector.

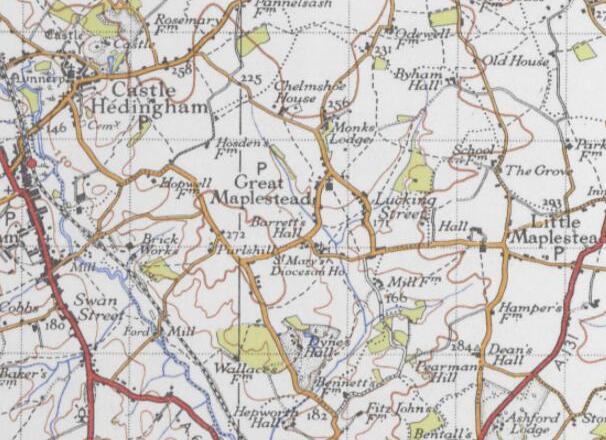
A map showing Great Maplestead and the surrounding area from the 20th century.

== St Giles' Church ==
St Giles' Church is well known within Great Maplestead. It is located in the centre of the village and houses 3 bells in the tower, with the oldest having been cast in the 15th century. St Giles is run by the Reverend Beverley Vincent and runs weekly Sunday services. The church is made of two parts: the Norman building was built first, followed by the Deane Chapel which was built in the year 1626. In 1612 the church had to be partially rebuilt with red bricks after being struck by lightning.

== Education ==
Great Maplestead is home to the primary school St Giles C of E Primary. The school has existed since 1863. The primary school adopted the same name as St Giles' Church as the vicar and church wardens became trustees after the idea of the school was presented by Mrs Mary Gee. She created the idea of a school in 1836, when she opened a charity school, her idea then became a reality when she was presented a piece of land where she was able to build the school where it currently stands now. The school was open to both boys and girls and has made many improvements over the years, starting off with just two classrooms. Since then three more classrooms have been built, as well as a school hall. Through time other essentials have also been added, such as installing the school's first telephone in 1955. The governing body for St Giles C of E Primary school have drawn up future plans for the school, including efforts to bring the school's inspection status from 'Good' to 'Outstanding'.

== Notable residents ==
- Robert Adams (sculptor and designer)
- Bernard Stevens, composer
- Margaret Tyndal Winthrop, third wife of John Winthrop
- John Scott Martin - actor
