= Phillips Payson Jr. =

Phillips Payson
- Born: January 18, 1736; Walpole, Massachusetts Bay Colony
- Died: January 11, 1801; Chelsea, Massachusetts, United States
- Education: Harvard College (1754)
- Spouse: Elizabeth Stone
- Children: Phillips Payson (1760-1809)
- Parent(s): Phillips Payson, Anne Swift
- Ordained: Oct 26, 1757
- Congregations served: Chelsea
- Title: Reverend

Phillips Payson (January 18, 1736 – January 11, 1801) was an American Congregationalist minister who was the pastor for the town of Chelsea, Massachusetts from 1757 until his death.

Payson is not the same man as Captain Samuel Payson who also fought during the Battle of Lexington. (Capt. Payson thereafter sold his farm to loan the money to his town to fund the revolution.)

He was born in Walpole, the son of Rev. Phillips Payson Sr. (1704–1778) and Anne Swift (1706–1756). The Payson family originated from Nazeing, England, first settling in the Massachusetts Bay Colony as early as 1635. Payson graduated from Harvard in 1754. He was ordained three years later. He married Elizabeth Stone (1735–1800), daughter of Rev. James Stone and Elizabeth Swift. Payson was a charter member of the American Academy of Arts and Sciences (1780).

== History ==
Due to the policies of the British Empire, the free people of the Province of Massachusetts Bay were being reduced under a despotism that denied the authority of their elected representatives to govern. Instead a military government based in Boston had been granted absolute power.

Payson was the minister of a Protestant congregation in Chelsea, when he spoke an Election Sermon in support of the American Revolution and its goals of religious and civil liberty. He advocated a break from political tradition by emphasizing the new start of society in New England with statements (based on Galatians 4:26, 31) such as, "Recollecting our pious ancestors, the first settlers of the country, – nor shall we look for ancestry beyond that period, – and we may say in the most literal sense, we are children not of the bond woman, but of the free."

Rev. Dr. Payson and his congregants thereafter freely elected to support and protect their liberties, and formed an armed party to protect their parish. During the Battles of Lexington and Concord, their militia engaged British troops at Menotomy:

    "The Rev. Mr. Payson, of Chelsea, in Massachusetts Bay, a mild, thoughtful, sensible man, at the head of a party of his own parish, attacked a party of the regulars, killed some and took the rest prisoners. This gentleman has been hitherto on the side of government, but oppression having got to that pitch beyond which even a wise man cannot bear, he has taken up arms in defence of those rights, civil and religious, which cost their forefathers so dearly. The cruelty of the King’s troops, in some instances, I wish to disbelieve. They entered one house in Lexington where were two old men, one a deacon of the church, who was bed-ridden, and another not able to walk, who was sitting in his chair; both these they stabbed and killed on the spot, as well as an innocent child running out of the house.”– Pennsylvania Journal, August 2.[6]

== Bibliography ==
- Payson, Phillips (1762). A sermon preach'd at the ordination of the Rev. Mr. Samuel Payson : to the pastoral care of the church at Lunenburgh. September 8th 1762. : Published at the desire of many persons in said town--to whom it is humbly dedicated. Boston: Thomas and John Fleet. OCLC 62817748.
- Payson, Phillips (1768). A sermon preached at the ordination of the Reverend Mr. John Payson : to the pastoral care of the Church of Christ in Fitchburgh, January 27, 1768. Boston: Richard Draper. OCLC 62817750.
- Payson, Phillips (1778). A sermon preached before the honorable Council, and the honorable House of representatives, of the state of Massachusetts-Bay, in New-England, at Boston, May 27, 1778. Being the anniversary for the election of the honorable Council. Boston: John Gill. LCCN 40017990. OCLC 874580584.
- Payson, Phillips (1782). A memorial of Lexington Battle, and of some signal interpositions of Providence in the American Revolution. : a sermon preached at Lexington, on the nineteenth of April, 1782. The anniversary of the commencement of the war between Great-Britain and America, which opened in a most tragical scene, in that town, on the nineteenth of April, 1775. Boston: Benjamin Edes & Sons. LCCN 15013269. OCLC 62817747.
- Payson, Phillips (1783). A sermon preached at the ordination of the Rev. Mr. Seth Payson to the pastoral care of the church in Rindge, December 4th, 1782. Boston: T. & J. Fleet. LCCN 94840762. OCLC 62817749.
- Payson, Phillips (1800). A sermon, delivered at Chelsea, January 14, 1800. : a day devoted by the inhabitants of said town, to pay their tribute of grief on the sorrowful event of the death of General Washington. Boston: Samuel Etheridge. LCCN 17008416. OCLC 62834511.

== See also ==
- Edward Payson (1783–1827), nephew
