= Greater Boston League =

Greater Boston League

The Greater Boston League (GBL) is a high school athletic conference in District 5 of the Massachusetts Interscholastic Athletic Association. The league originally included teams from the cities and towns of Arlington, Cambridge, Everett, Malden, Medford, Peabody, Revere, Somerville, and Waltham. Teams continued to leave for different leagues until only those of Everett, Malden, Medford, and Somerville were left in 2017. The league disbanded that year and the remaining members joined the Northeastern Conference. The GBL reformed in 2019. The four members that remained in the GBL in 2017 (Everett, Malden, Medford, and Somerville) rejoined the league with the addition of Revere.

== Schools ==
The following schools are current members of the Greater Boston League.

School	Location	Colors	Enrollment	Nickname
Chelsea High School	Chelsea, Massachusetts		1611	Red Devils
Everett High School	Everett, Massachusetts		1961	Crimson Tide
Lynn Classical High School	Lynn, Massachusetts		1658	Rams
Lynn English High School	Lynn, Massachusetts		2176	Bulldogs
Malden High School	Malden, Massachusetts		1856	Golden Tornados
Medford High School	Medford, Massachusetts		1256	Mustangs
Revere High School	Revere, Massachusetts		2084	Patriots
Somerville High School	Somerville, Massachusetts		1310	Highlanders
