= Monte Moore (athletic director) =

American athlete, coach, and athletics administrator (1891–1949)

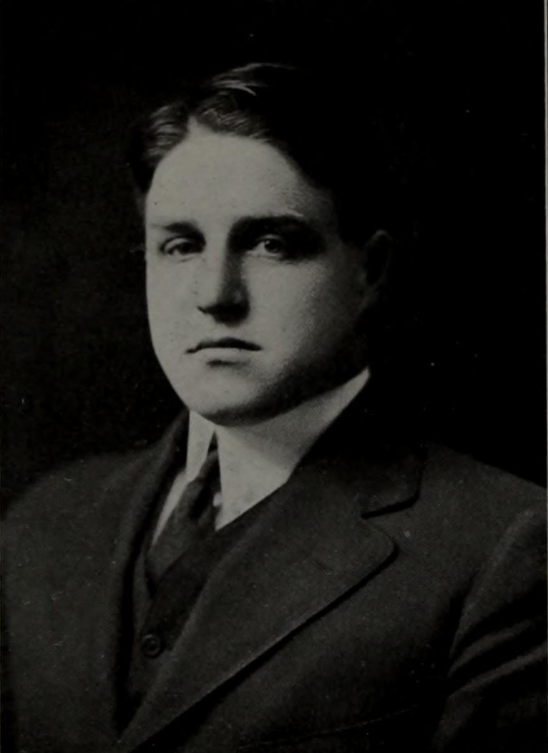
- Moore pictured in The Mirror (1915), Bates College yearbook

Biographical details
- Born: December 9, 1891; Randolph, Maine, U.S.
- Died: February 9, 1949 (aged 57); Lewiston, Maine, U.S.

Playing career

Football
- 1911–1914: Bates
- Positions: Guard (football); Pitcher (baseball)

Coaching career (HC unless noted)

Football
- 1944: Bates

Basketball
- 1943–1944: Bates

Administrative career (AD unless noted)
- 1916–1918: Deering HS (ME)
- 1918: Revere HS (MA)
- 1918–1935: Huntington School (MA)
- 1935–1938: Wilbraham Academy (MA)
- 1938–1949: Bates

Ernest Merrill "Monte" Moore (December 9, 1891^{1} – February 6, 1949) was an American athlete, coach, and athletics administrator. He served as the athletic director at Bates College from 1938 to 1949.

== Early life ==
Moore was born in Randolph, Maine on December 9, 1891^{1}, to Walter E. and Rita G (Merrill) Moore. He attended school in Gardiner, Maine and enrolled at Bates College in 1911. He played guard for the school's football team and pitched for the Bates baseball team. He was captain of the 1914 Bates football team and graduated the following spring. In 1918, he married Ruth Frost of Bangor, Maine. They had two daughters.

== Administrative career ==
Moore began his career in education as assistant headmaster at Fort Fairfield High School. He then spent two years as the athletic director and football, baseball, basketball, and track coach at Deering High School. In 1918, he moved to Massachusetts to become the director of athletics at Revere High School. He then spent 17 years as athletic director and football and baseball coach at the Huntington School in Boston. From 1935 to 1938, he was the athletic director at the Wilbraham Wesleyan Academy.

In 1938, Moore returned to Bates College as athletic director. During World War II, coached baseball, basketball, and football teams, which consisted of students from the V-12 Navy College Training Program.

Moore underwent surgery on January 13, 1949. He did not recover and died on February 6, 1949, at the Central Maine General Hospital.

== Notes ==
1. Multiple sources give Moore's date of birth as December 9, 1891. However, his headstone states that he was born on December 9, 1892.
