= Gloucester High School (Massachusetts) =

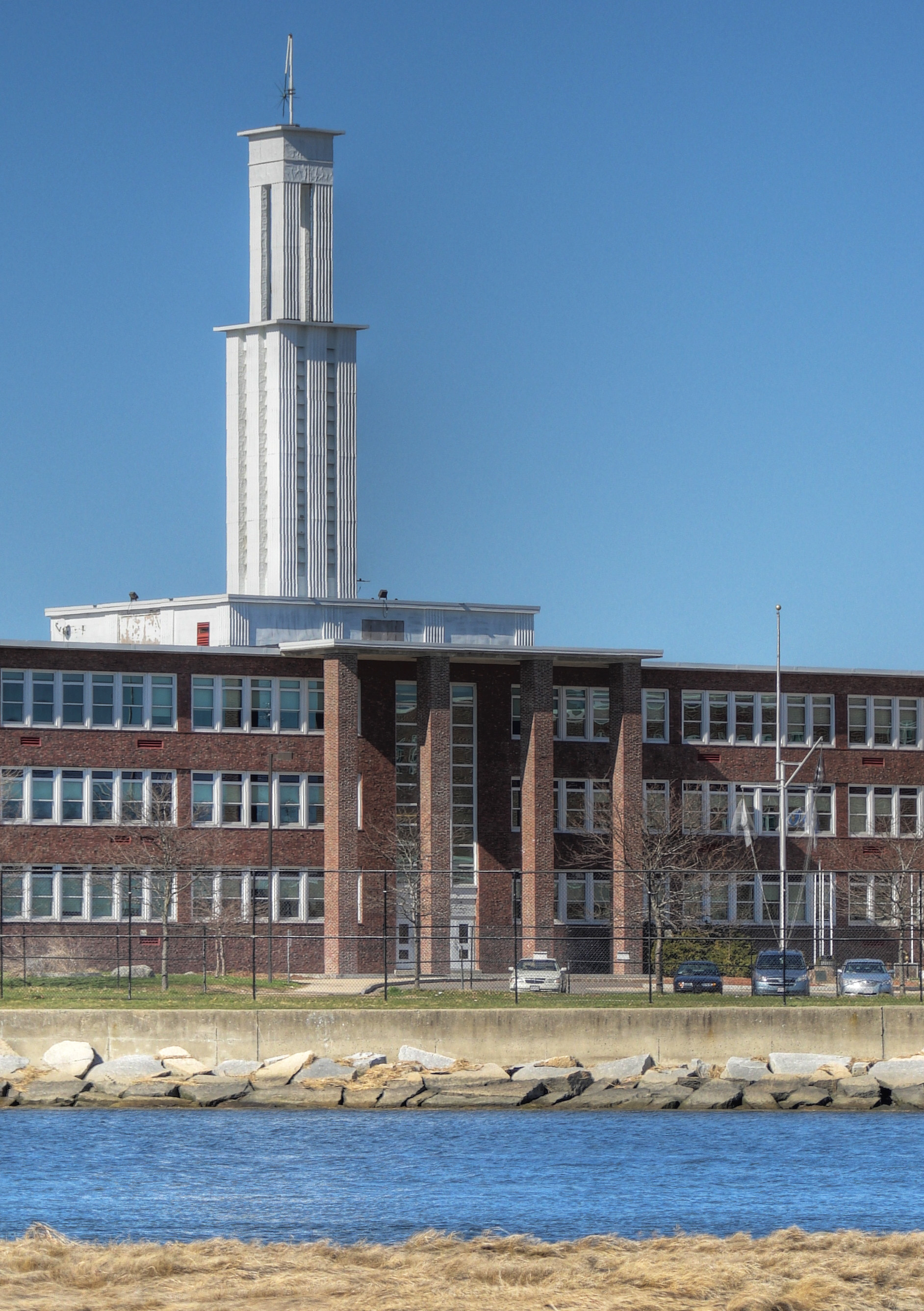

Location
- 32 Leslie O. Johnson Rd. Gloucester, Massachusetts 01930; United States; 42°36′48″N 70°40′34″W

Information
- Type: Public; High school Open enrollment
- Motto: "Fair Winds and Following Seas."
- Established: 1839; 187 years ago
- CEEB code: 220878
- Principal: John Perella
- Grades: 9–12
- Enrollment: 807 (2023-2024)
- Language: English
- Colors: Maroon and Vegas gold
- Athletics conference: Northeastern Conference
- Sports: MIAA - Division 2
- Mascot: Fishermen
- Website: ghs.gloucesterschools.com

Gloucester High School (/ˈɡlɒstər/ GLOST-ər) is a public four-year comprehensive secondary school, with just over 800 students and 150 faculty and staff, serving Gloucester, Massachusetts. It is accredited by the New England Association of Schools and Colleges and is a member of the Northeast Alliance of High Schools.

== History ==
Established by 1839, Gloucester High School became a four-year institution by 1857. In 1889, the school moved into its then new building on Dale Avenue. The Dale Avenue building was converted to Central Grammar School in 1939. The current Gloucester High School, located along the Annisquam River, near the entrance to Gloucester Harbor, was completed in 1939, with an addition in the 1970s and a new Field House wing added in the 1990s.

== Athletics ==
Reflector, April 1916

Gloucester High School is well known for its many athletic teams and competes in the Northeastern Conference (NEC) of the Massachusetts Interscholastic Athletic Association (MIAA).

- FALL
  - Football
    - State Champions: 1991 (3A), 1995 (3A), 2000 (3A), 2007 (2A), 2009 (1A), 2010 (1A)
    - State Finalists: 1987 (2), 1998 (3B), 2008 (2A)
    - League Champions: 1987, 1991, 1995, 1998, 2000, 2006, 2007, 2008, 2009, 2010, 2015
  - Soccer
    - Boy's - League Champions: 2006, 2007
  - Cross Country
    - Division 1 State Champions: 1994, 1995, 1996, 1997, 1998, 1999. *League Champions: 1992–2006, 2007
  - Golf
- WINTER
  - Hockey
    - State Champions: 1993, 1998, 2006
    - League Champions: 1993, 1998, 2006, 2008
  - Basketball
    - League Champions: 2000–2007, 2009–2012, 2013–2015
- SPRING
  - Baseball
    - League Champions: 1988, 1994, 1998, 2003, 2009
  - Lacrosse
    - League Champions: 1999, 2002
  - Track
    - League Champions: 11 of last 15 seasons (The track team has a co-op with Rockport and Manchester-Essex High School)
  - Tennis

== Notable alumni ==
- Roger Cressey, former member of the United States National Security Council, terrorism analyst for NBC News, president of Good Harbor Consulting, and adjunct professor at Georgetown University
- Billy MacLeod, Boston Red Sox pitcher
- Stuffy McInnis, former MLB player (Philadelphia Athletics, Boston Red Sox, Cleveland Indians, Boston Braves, Pittsburgh Pirates)
- Laila McQueen, drag queen and makeup artist (RuPaul's Drag Race)
- Mark Parisi, award-winning cartoonist Off the Mark (comic strip), and author
- Benjamin A. Smith II, U.S. Senator from Massachusetts
- Vermin Supreme, political satirist and perennial candidate for public office

== Teen pregnancy controversy ==
On June 18, 2008, the high school drew international attention as news broke that 18 students had become pregnant in the last year, over four times the previous year's reported pregnancies. Principal Joseph Sullivan claimed that some of the girls had made a pact to become pregnant together, one even seeking a homeless 24-year-old man in her pursuits to conceive. Gloucester mayor Carolyn Kirk quickly responded that they had no confirmation of any pregnancy pact. Finally, one pregnant student, interviewed on Good Morning America, said: "There was definitely no pact...There was a group of girls already pregnant that decided they were going to help each other to finish school and raise their kids together."

Media reactions to the event ranged from general criticism of the episode as representing a misguided adolescent shortcut to adulthood and identity, to the matter of whether statutory rape occurred; some of the girls were under 16, which in Massachusetts made it illegal for their partners to have sex with them. Most early media reactions were not completely accurate because they had not received all of the necessary information until later.

During the 2007–2008 school year, two staff members began to publicly advocate that the school clinic provide contraception without parental consent, largely in response to the surge in student pregnancies. This recommendation drew opposition from the board of Addison Gilbert Hospital, which sponsors the clinic. The clinic staff, a pediatrician and nurse practitioner, resigned in protest at the end of the school year. On October 8, 2008, the Gloucester School Committee granted the use of contraceptives through the Student Health Center, provided the students had parental approval.

=== In popular culture ===
The "pregnancy pact" controversy inspired some fictional treatments.

- The Law & Order: Special Victims Unit episode "Babes", airing in November 2008, featured a pregnancy pact between four high-school girls, with one becoming involved with a mentally-ill homeless man to conceive.
- The following March, an episode of Bones, "The Salt in the Wounds", featured a high-school girls' volleyball team with many members pregnant or already having given birth.
- Barbara Delinsky published a book titled, Not My Daughter, which was inspired by events in Gloucester.
- On January 23, 2010, Lifetime premiered a movie called The Pregnancy Pact, which is inspired by these events.
- The controversy is also the subject of a documentary, The Gloucester 18. The film crew interviewed a number of the girls allegedly involved in the pact, many of whom speak publicly for the first time in the movie. The documentary purports to be the only source of the true story behind the Gloucester pregnancy pact and includes interviews with the girls and their families as well as Dr. Brian Orr and nurse Kimberly Daly, who ran the health clinic at Gloucester High during the time of the controversy.
- It also went international with the 2010 Spanish miniseries titled El Pacto, based on the Gloucester High pact as well as a 2011 French feature film, 17 Girls, a story of "young female friendship—and naiveté" is based on the Gloucester High's pact. It is the first feature film from sisters Delphine and Muriel Coulin.
