= Off the Mark =

Off the Mark may refer to:

- Off the Mark (comic strip), a comic panel created by Mark Parisi
- Off the Mark (film), a 1987 American comedy film
