= Masconomet Regional High School =

Public high school in Boxford, Massachusetts, United States

- Masconomet Chieftains

Location
- 20 Endicott Road; Boxford, Massachusetts 01921; United States; 42°37′39″N 70°58′28″W

Information
- Type: Public, Coeducational
- Religious affiliation: None
- Established: September 14, 1959
- Status: Open
- School district: Masconomet Regional School District
- School number: 20
- Principal: Katie DiNardo
- Teaching staff: 82.90 (FTE)
- Grades: 9–12
- Enrollment: 975 (2023–2024)
- Student to teacher ratio: 11.76
- Colors: Alizarin crimson and eggshell
- Slogan: Learning Is Life
- Fight song: "Stand Up and Cheer"
- Athletics: Yes
- Athletics conference: Northeastern Conference
- Mascot: Chieftain
- Nickname: Masco
- Team name: Chieftains
- Newspaper: The Chieftain Chronicle, Exit 51
- Yearbook: MiToBo
- Budget: $32,622,152 total $16,694 per pupil (2016)
- Communities served: Topsfield, Boxford, Middleton
- Website: https://mascohs.masconomet.org/

Masconomet Regional High School is co-located with Masconomet Regional Middle School in Boxford, Massachusetts, United States and also serves the towns of Topsfield and Middleton. Masconomet Regional Middle School serves grades 7 and 8 while the Masconomet Regional High School serves grades 9 through 12. The current school superintendent is Michael Harvey. Both schools are located on the same property, and share a cafeteria, gym, auditorium, and buses.

== Location and History ==
The school campus is located on Endicott Street in Boxford off of Exit 72 on US Interstate 95. Masconomet lies at the intersection of the towns of Topsfield, Boxford and Middleton, the towns which it serves. The property is completely in Boxford, however, the mailing address was in Topsfield (until the 2014–15 school year) due to Boxford's post office being too small to handle all of Masco's mail upon the school's inception. Masconomet was created by a charter of the three towns created in 1959. Masconomet celebrated its 50th anniversary during the 2009–10 school year. Masconomet Regional High School was named after Chief Masconomet, sagamore of the Agawam tribe that lived in Essex County at the time of the English colonization. The original school building was constructed in 1959 and rebuilt in 2002. When the school was rebuilt in 2002, the old high school building was converted into a two-story middle school and a new three-story high school was built adjacent to the middle school facility.

== Classes ==
Masconomet offers a large selection of academic course offering. A strong core curriculum is enhanced by a large selection of elective courses. Electives include courses in EMT training, co-taught science/social studies courses, forensics, 1960s course, early childhood, and a strong variety of computer education courses including computer gaming. In 2006, the Assistant Principal, Donald A. Doliber was named Assistant Principal of the Year and in 2008 David Mitchell was named National History Teacher of the Year.

== Athletics ==
Masco plays in the Northeastern Conference. The school's colors are Alizarin Crimson & Eggshell.

In 2017, the football team had the opportunity to play against Everett High School in Fenway Park the day before Thanksgiving.

The baseball team earned the Division II Massachusetts State Championship in 2000 by defeating Drury 7–2. They defeated the 22–0 Danvers squad in the second round, North Andover, and then Westford Academy to capture the North Section. They defeated Franklin in walk-off fashion after 8 innings in the state semi-final on their way to earning the first title in school baseball history.

In a 2012 lacrosse game against Boston College High School, senior Jake Gillespie scored a record-tying 9 goals. Gillespie now plays lacrosse for the Jumbos of Tufts University.

The boys' hockey team earned a Co-Cape Ann League title with Wilmington in the 2008–09 season, with an overall record of 14–5–2. Then again in 2013–14 season, with North Reading and an overall record of 15–5–2.

Masconomet added girls' hockey to its varsity program in 2000, with its inaugural game being played December 15, 2000 at Johnson Rink at Pingree.

In the 2013–14 school year, Masconomet won state titles in Boys' Soccer (over Walpole, 5–3) and Baseball (10–2 over Westwood). Also, the Ultimate club team won the Massachusetts state title and Northeast Regionals in Maine.

In the fall of the 2015–16 school year, Masconomet won the Division 2 North Final in Boys' Soccer (over Concord-Carlisle, 2–1).

In a December 8, 2019, game against the New England Patriots, the Kansas City Chiefs’ equipment was accidentally delivered to New Jersey. A backup plan was apparently set for the Chiefs to use Masconomet helmets.

For the 2019–20 season, the boys Swim and Dive team went undefeated throughout the CAL dual meet season and the CAL Championship Meet at the end of the season.

== Notable alumni ==
- Cidny Bullens, author, musician, and Grammy Awards nominee
- Abbey D'Agostino, track and field, Dartmouth College; 7-time individual NCAA track and cross country national champion, participant on the US Olympic track team in Rio 2016
- Ford Fischer, journalist and filmmaker
- Corey Johnson, past-Speaker of the New York City Council and lobbyist
- Tim Johnson, professional cyclist, US National Cyclocross champion
- Chris Kreider, NHL ice hockey player for the New York Rangers (previously played for Boston College); transferred to Phillips Academy after two years at Masconomet and then transferred back to Masconomet to officially earn his high school diploma
- Donna Murphy, actress and winner of multiple Tony Awards
- Debra Jo Rupp, actress, most notably on That '70s Show
