= Revere Public Schools =

School district near Boston, Massachusetts

Location
- 101 School Street; Revere, Massachusetts United States

District information
- Type: Public
- Grades: PK-12
- Superintendent: Dianne Kelly
- Asst. superintendent(s): Richard Gallucci; Danielle Mokaba-Bernardo
- Schools: 11
- Budget: $108,825,861 total $14,534 per pupil (2016)
- NCES District ID: 2510050

Students and staff
- Students: 6,519 in 2011-12
- Teachers: 444.7 FTE in 2010-11
- Student–teacher ratio: 14.0 in 2010-11

Other information
- School committee: Fredrick A. Sannella; Carol A. Tye; Stacey A. Rizzo; Anthony D’Ambrosio; Susan Gravellese; Michael Ferrante
- Website: www.reverek12.org

Revere Public Schools (RPS) is a school district headquartered in Revere, Massachusetts.

== History ==
In February 1945 the district created its Department of Audio-Visual Aids.

In a five-year period from 1993 to 1998, enrollment increased by 25% in the district's elementary schools. Around 1998 the district had passed a roof repair and asbestos referendum worth $2.2 million. Three schools had their roofs repaired. The same referendum also funded the installation of a new fire alarm system at Revere High School.

In 2001 the school district began an $83.5 million construction program to build four new school buildings, which together were to house five schools.

By 2005, the Massachusetts Legislature approved the request of the Revere school system to use June 17, Bunker Hill Day, as a day of school instruction.

In 2009 groups of parents objected to a Massachusetts General Hospital-operated clinic at Revere High School that provided contraception services. The parents started a petition to have a November 3, 2009, bill to eliminate these services. The voters in the city ultimately did not approve of the vote for removing the contraception services.

In 2014 an increase in the number of immigrants occurred district-wide, and the high school now has a program for new immigrants.

== Schools ==
High schools:

- Revere High School

Middle school:

- Garfield Middle School
- Rumney Marsh Academy
- Susan B. Anthony Middle School

Elementary schools:

- Beachmont Veterans Memorial Elementary School
- Abraham Lincoln Elementary School
- Staff Sergeant James J. Hill Elementary School
- Paul Revere Elementary School
- A. C. Whelan Elementary School
  - The Massachusetts State Government was originally scheduled to reimburse the Revere city government for 90% of the costs for the construction of what is the current Whelan school. In 2001 the Whelan project was put on the School Building Assistance program list. However the state delayed giving the funds. The Revere government waited for a three-year period to acquire the funds. In February 2004, all of the members of the City of Revere City Council voted to have the current school campus built. Construction was scheduled to begin in June 2004. At that time the state government had not given the funds to the municipality.

Alternative schools:

- SeaCoast School
