= Chris Alba =

American activist (1973–2023)

Christian L. Alba
- Born: May 19, 1973; Revere, Massachusetts, US
- Died: September 23, 2023 (aged 50)
- Organization(s): City of Revere’s Substance Use Disorder and Homelessness Initiative Office (SUDHI)
- Movement: Harm reduction
- Children: 3

Chris Alba was a harm reduction advocate and champion for homeless people from Revere, Massachusetts.

== Early life ==
Alba was born and raised in Revere. His father, Dennis Murphy, was chronically homeless. Alba described regularly searching for his missing father near Revere Beach as one of his first outreach experiences. Alba was an injection heroin user.

== Career ==
Alba began his professional outreach work in the early 2000s, attempting to prevent the spread of HIV and hepatitis by distributing sterile needles to people living on the street, despite the unclear legality of this practice. Alba worked at the harm reduction organization, Healthy Streets Lynn, for ten years.

Due partially to Alba’s advocacy, Revere’s fire department became the first in the United States to supply its trucks with naloxone.

In 2021, Alba provided testimony to support the legalization of supervised injection sites in Massachusetts.

In May 2022, Revere’s mayor, Brian Arrigo, declared Alba Public Servant of the Month.

Alba was slated to become the co-executive director of No More Anonymous Death, commonly referred to as NOMAD, but died before transitioning to the position.

== Death and legacy ==
On September 23, 2023, Alba was found dead in his apartment by his son. His cause of death was assumed to be related to colorectal cancer.

In an article commemorating Alba’s life, The Boston Globe called Alba, “a pioneer for safe drug use on the streets” and “one of the nation’s foremost advocates for safe drug use”. Revere Journal called Alba, “a champion for the city’s most vulnerable”. About Alba, Lauren Buck, Revere’s Chief of Health and Human Services stated, “he’s really an irreplaceable presence in the harm reduction outreach worker community, not just for Revere, but for the state and really, the country.”

The Chris Alba Emergency Warming Center, which provides emergency shelter and services to 24 individuals a night, was named for Alba. In 2024, the center was awarded a $142,800 grant by the Healey-Driscoll Administration.

Alba’s colleagues claim Alba saved the lives of hundreds of people who would have otherwise died from infections and overdoses.

Alba’s son, Robert Alba, became a mental health case worker in Lynn, Massachusetts.
