= Trey Yingst =

American journalist (born 1993)

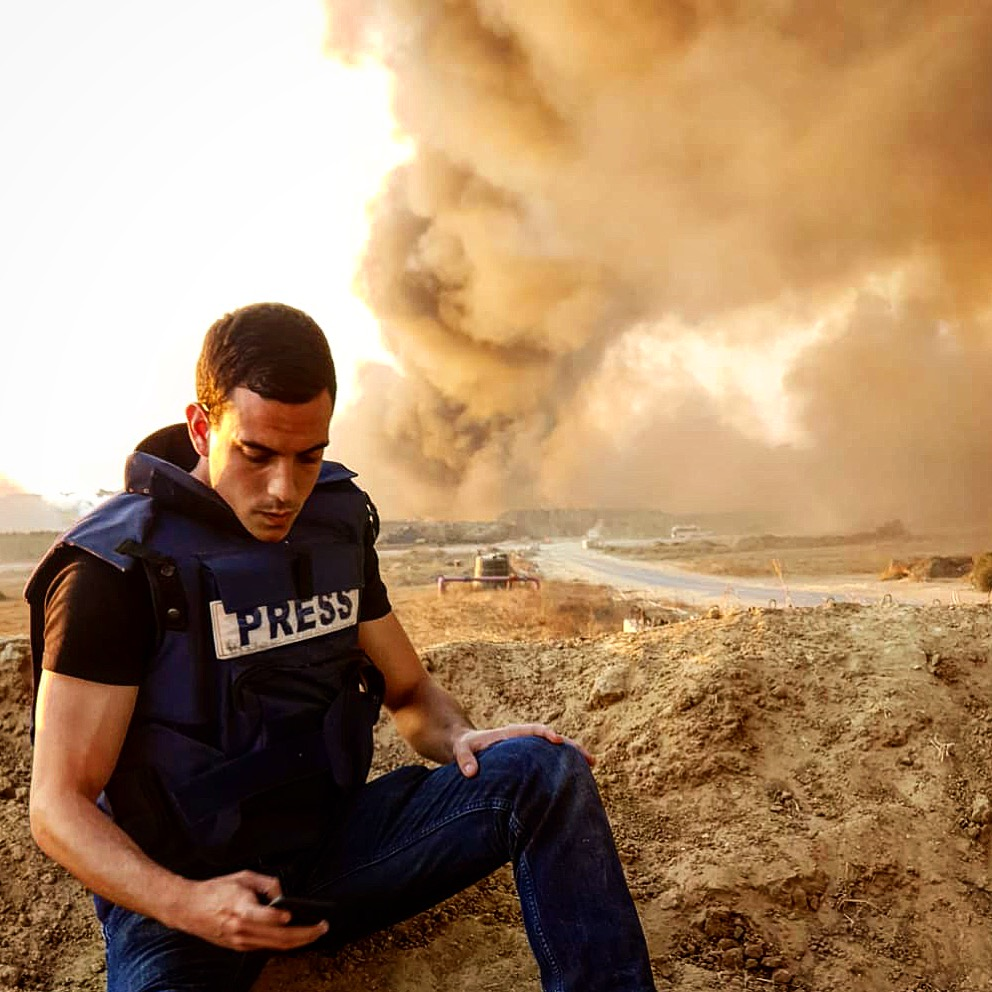
- Yingst in the field
- Born: September 10, 1993 (age 33); Hershey, Pennsylvania, United States
- Education: American University
- Occupations: Chief Foreign Correspondent (Fox News)
- Website: www.treyyingst.com

Trey Yingst (born 1993) is an American journalist who serves as the chief foreign correspondent for Fox News based in Jerusalem. Yingst has reported from the Gaza Strip and around the Middle East, appearing on Fox News programs.

== Early life and education ==
Yingst was born in the Harrisburg, Pennsylvania area where he attended Central Dauphin High School. He studied at American University and received a BA in Broadcast Journalism from American University School of Communication in 2016.

== Career ==
Yingst began his career as a journalist at the media outlet he co-founded with Ford Fischer, News2Share, while both were students at American University. While at News2Share, Yingst reported from Gaza, Ukraine, Rwanda and Uganda. Yingst was also arrested during a demonstration in Ferguson, as reported by the Los Angeles Times. The arrest was later expunged with assistance from the ACLU.

He then joined One America News Network where he served as the network's Chief White House Correspondent, covering the Trump administration for 16 months.

In 2018, Yingst joined Fox News’ international correspondent team.

In February 2019, Israeli troops moved Yingst and his crew during a live shot due to grenades being thrown in their direction. He has also reported amid rocket fire, some of which occurred while he was live on the air.

He was interviewed by Mediaite in March 2019. Later in 2019, he attended the White House Correspondents Dinner. Yingst was also placed on the Forbes 30 Under 30 list for Media – 2019.

In February 2022, Yingst reported from Kyiv, Ukraine during the Russian invasion of Ukraine.

In October 2023, Yingst reported on the events in Israel during the Gaza war for Fox News, extensively covering the Kfar Aza massacre and embedding with the IDF in Gaza, covering the tunnels under the Al-Shifa Hospital in November 2023. Yingst was forced to take cover due to safety concerns at times during the conflict. On October 11, Yingst reported live from Kibbutz Be'eri, the site of the Be'eri massacre, where he described the scene, saying, "You could smell the stench of death in the air" and saying it was "the most horrific thing I have ever seen." Yingst has earned praise for his calm and poised reporting, revelatory of unique articulation, during the war.

On August 6, 2024, Yingst was named Chief Foreign Correspondent by Fox News.

During the Radio Television Digital News Association’s 34th annual First Amendment Awards on 6 March 2025, Yingst expressed gratitude to the Palestinian journalists for reporting in Gaza in his acceptance speech.
