= Ford Fischer =

Independent video journalist and co-founder of News2Share

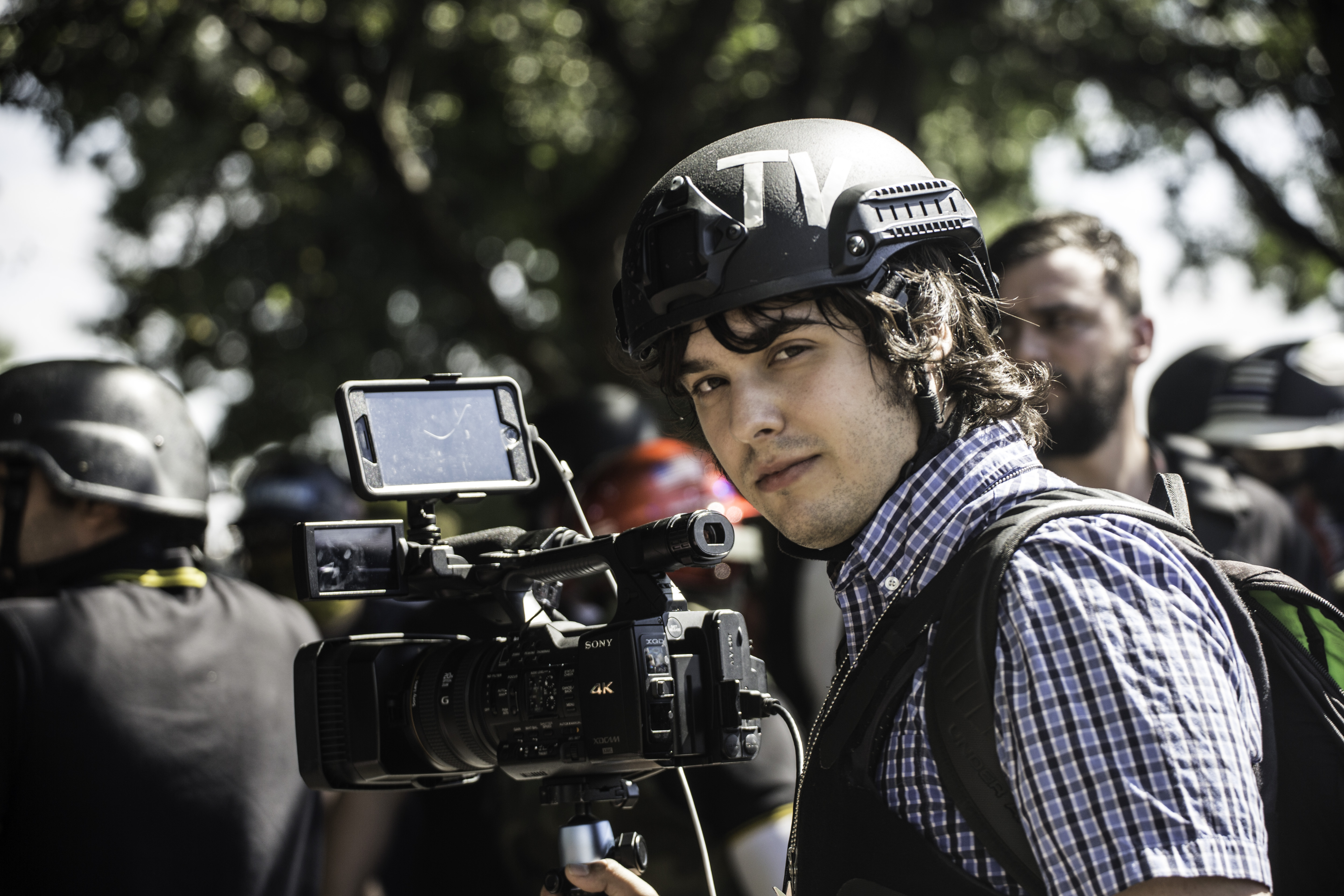
- Ford Fischer at a 2018 rally
- Education: American University
- Occupations: Journalist; Filmmaker
- Website: News2Share

Ford Fischer is an independent journalist and filmmaker. He is the co-founder of News2Share, a media company in DC with White House press credentials. News2share is a platform for raw video journalism related to political activism.

== Early career ==
Fischer started reporting on politics when he went to Masconomet Regional High School. He filmed local politics in the town of Boxford, Massachusetts, for Boxford Cable TV. He received a degree in film and media arts from American University.

Fischer was an intern with Reason magazine in the summer of 2014.

== News2Share ==
Fischer co-founded News2Share with Trey Yingst in 2014 when they were both students of American University. Fischer's journalism involves recording political events such as those related to rallies and protests, later uploading raw unedited footage to online platforms where its shared and licensed to larger media organisations.

Fischer reported on the violence at the Unite the Right rally in Charlottesville, Virginia. His footage was featured in Spike Lee's BlacKkKlansman and ProPublica's Documenting Hate.

In 2019, Fischer's channel News2Share was demonetized and could no longer receive advertising revenue from YouTube. As part of a crackdown by on Holocaust denialism, YouTube removed two videos of raw footage by Fischer. One showing a Holocaust denier getting shouted down by Israeli and Palestinian protesters and another of Mike Peinovich Enoch, a neo-Nazi giving a speech. Views present in the footage were not advocated for by Fischer. YouTube's move made Fischer lose much of his income, money used by him to employ freelance journalists or to pay for his travel costs. After seven months, Fischer was able to get his channel remonetized by YouTube.

In September 2020, Fischer had his account taken off from Facebook. Not long after, Facebook addressed the matter and apologized for the action. After the 2020 United States presidential election, Fischer was suspended from posting on the platform.

=== Storming of the United States Capitol ===
Fischer recorded a rally held by President Donald Trump on January 6, 2021, just prior to the January 6 United States Capitol attack. His video included Trump's speech and the crowd reaction to it. He uploaded raw footage of the rally to YouTube, which was monetized by them on January 8, and then licensed by the BBC for its documentary about the rally and subsequent attack on the Capitol. In late January, the footage was removed by YouTube. YouTube alleged the footage was spreading election misinformation because it gave no counter-viewpoints or context. Fischer protested YouTube's actions on Twitter and pointed out that other networks still had livestreams of Trump's rally on their platforms. He said the situation made him angry, and that he was perplexed by the fact that YouTube did not distinguish between footage documenting an historical event and people purposefully spreading misinformation regarding the 2020 US election. YouTube responded by demonetizing Fischer's channel on grounds that it contained "harmful content". In early February, Fox News published an article about YouTube's "crackdown on independent media;" Fischer's channel was remonetized not long after. YouTube acknowledged their action constituted "over-enforcement" of their rules, but stated that Fischer's rally footage was "policy violative." Fischer stated that he hoped YouTube would revisit and make changes in its policies and its enforcement of them.

After his reporting of the US Capitol riots, Twitter shadow banned Fischer, an action which limits the ability of his account to appear in Twitter's search results, and which shows warnings about "potentially sensitive content" on his tweets. Journalist Matt Taibbi posted an article criticizing Twitter and Youtube's "crackdown on independent media". The article referenced Fischer. Fischer has stated that he considers it important that his Trump rally footage remain available to the public because it documents events relative to Donald Trump's second impeachment trial over his role in the events of January 6. Jay Ulfelder, a Harvard University academic, emailed YouTube to say that footage of the rally is "crucial archival material for future scholars looking to get a better sense of what happened".
