= Revere High School (Massachusetts) =

Location
- 101 School Street; Revere, Massachusetts 02151; United States; 42°24′27″N 71°00′34″W

Information
- School type: Public
- Motto: Knowledge is the basis for creativity
- Status: Open
- Superintendent: Dianne Kelly
- Principal: Shelagh St. Laurent
- Teaching staff: 156.36 (on an FTE basis)
- Grades: 9 to 12
- Enrollment: 2,098 (2023–2024)
- Student to teacher ratio: 13.42
- Colors: Red; White; Blue
- Athletics conference: Greater Boston League (GBL)
- Mascot: Paulie the Patriot
- Nickname: Patriots
- Rival: Winthrop High School
- Newspaper: The Patriot
- Yearbook: The Lantern
- Website: rhs.reverek12.org

Revere High School is a public four-year high school in Revere, Massachusetts, United States, operated by the Revere Public Schools system, and serving about 1,500 students annually. High school students from the district attend either Revere High, City Lab HighSchool, or the Northeast Metropolitan Regional Vocational High School in Wakefield.

== History ==
The current structure was opened in September 1974.

A $2.2 million referendum passed around 1998 funded the installation of a new fire alarm system. In 1998 the roof of the building began leaking, and the Revere town government estimated that the repair would cost $1 million. The leak had the potential of destroying the new fire alarm system.

In 2011 the school expanded class times, with each class being 80 minutes instead of 54 minutes, and began a semester-based system. It also began using iPads for school purposes, with each student having an iPad. In 2016, the one-to-one iPad program was changed to a one-to-one Chromebook program. School officials cited the cost-effectiveness of the Chromebooks in comparison to iPads as a major deciding factor. The switch was received favorably, as the Chromebooks are equipped with keyboards and are less likely to malfunction.

In 2014 the National Center for Urban School Transformation designated Revere High School as "one of the Best Urban High Schools in America."

The "Newcomers' Academy" was established in 2013 to support the education of Students with Limited or Interrupted Formal Education (SLIFE). The program has succeeded in reducing the drop-out rate, as well as advancing students to a level at which they may be integrated into regular classes. In 2016, 88% of students enrolled in the academy successfully made the transition. That same year, Revere High School was recognized by the "Schools of Opportunity" project organized by the National Education Policy Center, with the academy being a distinguishing factor.

In December 2018, "the Massachusetts School Building Authority announced its initial approval of the City’s bid for a new Revere High School."

A new school building at the former site of Wonderland Greyhound Park broke ground in August 2025, with completion expected by the 2028-2029 school year.

== Health center ==
The MGH Revere School Based Health Center (SBHC) is a fully functioning health center located inside Revere High School.

=== Contraceptive services ===
Revere High School's health center has birth control services, including contraceptives and the morning-after pill. The Massachusetts General Hospital operates this clinic. Students may use this clinic with guardians' permission.

In 2009, some parents objected to these services and started a petition to have them eliminated. The voters in the city ultimately defeated the controversial ballot initiative.

At the time, superintendent Dr. Paul Dakin was a vocal defendant of the students' access to family planning services. In response to the misinformation campaign waged by the local Catholic community, he said, "They will stoop to anything to get their moral issue across and take away parents' rights. I have a problem with people lying over a podium." In specific, Dakin was addressing claims made by a church bulletin that the School Committee voted in secret on the contraceptive policy, and that junior high students had access to the clinic within the high school.

== Student performance ==
In 2008 the rate of students attending tertiary education was 67% and the dropout rate was almost 9%. As of 2014, 80% of the school's graduates go to universities and colleges, and the school had a 3% dropout rate.

In 2009, the school had a graduation rate of 71.5%, which rose to 87.9% by 2017.

== Extracurricular activities ==
Among the Academic Extracurricular activities offered to Revere students are the Speech and Debate Team, who compete in the Massachusetts Forensics League, National Catholic Forensics League, and the National Forensics League, the Drama Guild, Model UN, Art Club, Book Club, Dance Team, ELL/Foreign Language Club, Friendship Club, Future Teachers Club, Gay Straight Alliance, Green Team/Community Service Club, Interact Club, Health & Fitness Club, Key Club, National Honor Society, North Shore Science League, Poetry Out Loud, Revere Culture Club, RHS Connect, RHS Newspaper, Robotics Club, Rock Ensemble, Stronghold Club, Technology Club and the Youth Empowerment Team.

=== Sports ===
Revere sponsors 16 Varsity sports: Baseball, Basketball (boys and girls), Cheerleading, Cross-country Track, Field Hockey, Football, Golf, Hockey, Indoor Track, Lacrosse (boys and girls), Soccer (boys and girls), Softball, Swimming, and Track. All teams competed in the Northeastern Conference of the Massachusetts Interscholastic Athletic Association until 2019, at which time all but the football team joined Everett, Malden, Medford, and Somerville in the Greater Boston League (GBL). The football team will join the GBL in 2020.

==== Football rivalry ====
Revere has a rivalry with neighboring Winthrop High School. The two teams play each other annually on Thanksgiving.
