= David Bavaro =

American football player (born 1967)

No. 59, 52
- Position: Linebacker

Personal information
- Born: March 27, 1967 (age 59); Danvers, Massachusetts, U.S.
- Listed height: 6 ft 0 in (1.83 m)
- Listed weight: 234 lb (106 kg)

Career information
- High school: Danvers
- College: Syracuse
- NFL draft: 1990: 9th round, 225th overall pick

Career history
- Phoenix Cardinals (1990); Buffalo Bills (1991); Minnesota Vikings (1992); New England Patriots (1993–1994); Israeli Defense Forces (2023–2026)

Awards and highlights
- Second-team All-East (1989)

Career NFL statistics
- Fumble recoveries: 2
- Stats at Pro Football Reference

David Anthony Bavaro (born March 27, 1967) is an American former professional football player who was a linebacker in the National Football League (NFL). He played college football for the Syracuse Orange before being selected by the Phoenix Cardinals in the ninth round of the 1990 NFL draft.

== Career ==
He played in the NFL for the Cardinals (1990), Buffalo Bills (1991), Minnesota Vikings (1992), and New England Patriots (1993–1994). His brother Mark Bavaro also played in the NFL. He formerly taught physical education at Malden Catholic High School. until his retirement at the end of the 2025-2026 school year.
