= Revere City Hall and Police Station =

- U.S. National Register of Historic Places
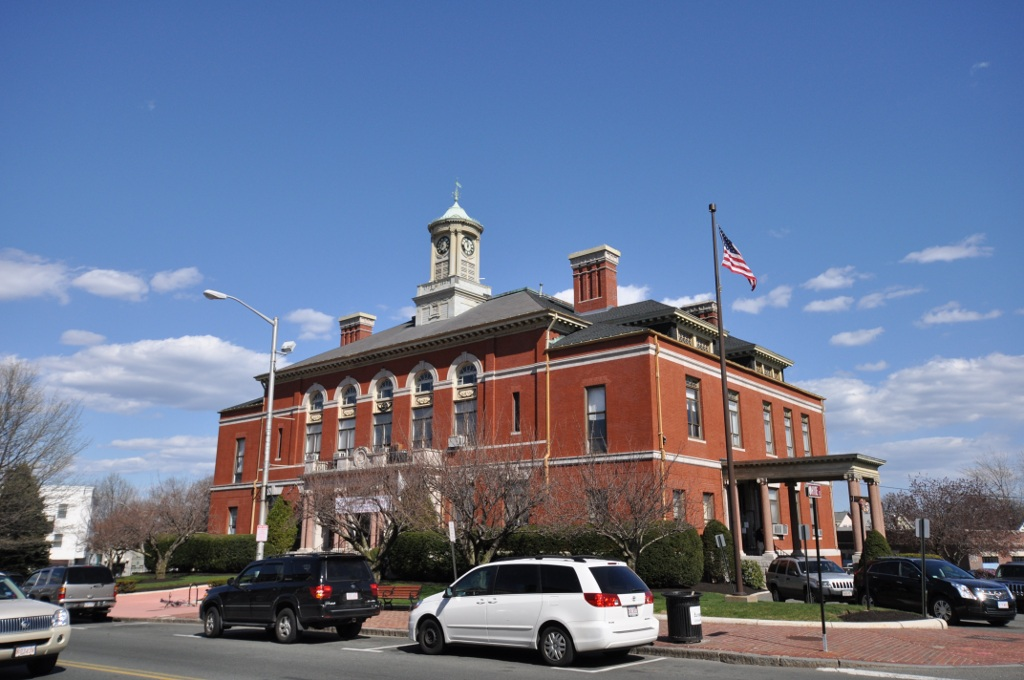
- Revere City Hall

- Location within Massachusetts Location within the United States
- Location: 281 Broadway & 23 Pleasant St., Revere, Massachusetts
- Coordinates: 42°24′28″N 71°0′47″W
- Area: less than one acre
- Built: 1897
- Architect: Cobb, Albert Winslow; Gore, Henry W.; Greenleaf, Luther C.
- Architectural style: Classical/Colonial Revival
- NRHP reference No.: 12000070
- Added to NRHP: March 7, 2012

The Revere City Hall and Police Station, located at 281 Broadway and 23 Pleasant Street, are the municipal heart of the city of Revere, Massachusetts. City Hall, a distinctive landmark on one of the city's major roads, is a 2 1/2-story brick Colonial Revival building that was built in 1897–98 to a design by Greenleaf and Cobb. The former police station, also a Colonial Revival brick building, was built in 1909 to a design by Hurd and Gore, and is situated just east of City Hall on the same parcel of land.

The city hall building was built at a time when Revere was still a town, and was first known as Town Hall; in addition to municipal offices, it initially also housed the public library. It was built on roughly the same site as Revere's first town hall, an 1835 Greek Revival structure destroyed by fire in 1897.

The cornerstone of the current building was placed on October 19, 1897. Senator Henry Cabot Lodge delivered an oration. The building was dedicated on January 11, 1899, this time with Lemuel K. Washburn delivering the oration.

Revere was reincorporated as a city in 1915. The former police station building served its original purpose for about 100 years, when the police were moved to new facilities on Revere Beach Parkway.

The buildings were listed on the National Register of Historic Places in 2012.

== See also ==
- National Register of Historic Places listings in Suffolk County, Massachusetts
