= Mark Bavaro =

American football player (born 1963)

No. 89, 83, 84
- Position: Tight end

Personal information
- Born: April 28, 1963 (age 63); Winthrop, Massachusetts, U.S.
- Listed height: 6 ft 4 in (1.93 m)
- Listed weight: 245 lb (111 kg)

Career information
- High school: Danvers (Danvers, Massachusetts)
- College: Notre Dame
- NFL draft: 1985: 4th round, 100th overall pick

Career history
- New York Giants (1985–1990); Cleveland Browns (1992); Philadelphia Eagles (1993–1994)

Awards and highlights
- 2× Super Bowl champion (XXI, XXV); 2× First-team All-Pro (1986, 1987); 2× Pro Bowl (1986, 1987); PFWA All-Rookie Team (1985); George Halas Award (1993); New York Giants Ring of Honor; 18th greatest New York Giant of all-time; First-team All-American (1984)

Career NFL statistics
- Receptions: 351
- Receiving yards: 4,733
- Receiving touchdowns: 39
- Stats at Pro Football Reference

Mark Anthony Bavaro (born April 28, 1963) is an American former professional football player who was a tight end for the New York Giants (1985–1990), Cleveland Browns (1992), and Philadelphia Eagles (1993–1994) in the National Football League (NFL). Bavaro was selected to the Pro Bowl for his performances in the 1986 and 1987 seasons and was a member of the Giants teams that won Super Bowls XXI and XXV.

After an All-American career at the University of Notre Dame, Bavaro was drafted by the Giants in the fourth round (#100 overall) in the 1985 NFL draft. He quickly emerged as a starter in his rookie season and became renowned during his Giants career for his blocking, toughness, and receiving skills. After a degenerative knee condition forced him to sit out the 1991 season, he returned to play three seasons for the Browns and Eagles before retiring in 1995. Since retiring, Bavaro has done work as an anti-abortion activist. His brother David also played in the NFL for four seasons.

== Early life and college ==
Bavaro was born in Winthrop, Massachusetts, as the second of three children to Wally, a track coach at Chelsea High School, and Christine, who studied to be a marriage and family therapist when her children were in school. Both of his grandfathers came from Italy. His younger brother David also played football professionally as a linebacker for four NFL teams over the course of four seasons. He attended Danvers High School in Danvers, Massachusetts, where he was a high school football All-American. He was a well-rounded athlete who also excelled in track and field at Danvers. After being intensively recruited by several colleges, he chose to play collegiately for the University of Notre Dame. He was recruited by head coach Dan Devine but played his four years under coach Gerry Faust. He played behind star tight end Tony Hunter as a freshman, then missed all but three minutes of his sophomore season due to a hand injury. He established himself as a starter as a junior, but grew home-sick and briefly contemplated quitting the team to move back home following the season. After Faust talked him into staying, he won All-America honors his senior season, when he totalled 32 receptions for 395 yards. Bavaro developed a reputation for playing through injuries while at Notre Dame. "He plays with pain better than any player I've seen in my 37 years of coaching," Faust later stated. He left Notre Dame after graduating in 1985 despite having one season of eligibility remaining (due to the redshirt status of his sophomore season) and was selected in the fourth round (#100 overall) of the 1985 NFL Draft by the New York Giants.

== Professional career ==
Coming out of college, Bavaro was known mostly for his blocking ability and was expected to play the role of a run blocking tight end as a professional. He earned the nickname "Rambo" early in his rookie season due to his intense playing style, quiet personality, and physical resemblance to Sylvester Stallone. After starting tight end Zeke Mowatt suffered a season-ending injury before the start of the 1985 season, coach Bill Parcells, who had called Bavaro the most impressive rookie during training camp, installed Bavaro as the starter. Bavaro finished his rookie season with 37 receptions, 511 yards, and 4 touchdowns. He also set a team record with 12 receptions in one game during quarterback Phil Simms' 513 yard passing effort against the Cincinnati Bengals on October 13, 1985. After the game, which the Giants lost 35–30, Bavaro responded in the low-key manner that would typify his career, "[i]t was nothing special, the plays were the same stuff. I don't know what they did. I just caught a lot of balls. I'd rather win, that's all." Bavaro was named to the PFWA All-Rookie Team for his performance during the season.

Bavaro continued his emergence in the 1986 season. He remained the starter after Mowatt's recovery from injury and emerged as a favorite target of Simms. He finished the season with 66 receptions, 1,001 yards, and 4 touchdowns and was selected to his first Pro Bowl. His 66 receptions broke the Giants record for receptions by a tight end previously held by Bob Tucker (59). Perhaps the most well-known play of Bavaro's career occurred in a Monday Night Football game in 1986. Here is a description of the play taken from a Monday Night Football broadcast in 2005: "On Dec. 1 1986, New York Giants tight end Mark Bavaro cements his reputation as one of the toughest men in the NFL. With the Giants trailing, Bavaro catches an innocent pass from Phil Simms over the middle. It takes nearly seven 49ers defenders to finally drag him down, some of which are carried for almost 20 yards, including future Hall of Famer Ronnie Lott. Bavaro's inspiring play jump starts the Giants, who win the game and eventually the Super Bowl." This reputation as a tough player was further cemented later in the season when he played for six weeks with a broken jaw that forced him to sip food through a straw. He continued to establish his reputation as an excellent blocker during the season, and was described as "the premier tight end" in the league by 49ers' coach Bill Walsh before the team's playoff matchup. The Giants finished the regular season 14–2 and defeated the Denver Broncos 39–20 in Super Bowl XXI. Bavaro's third quarter touchdown gave the Giants the lead which they would never relinquish. After the season Bavaro was chosen to appear on the cover of Sports Illustrated's NFL preview issue for the 1987 season. Bavaro was pictured on the cover in a cutoff shirt holding his shoulder pads over his shoulder, the caption reads "The Living End: Mark Bavaro of the New York Giants". The cover also featured Bavaro celebrating a touchdown in the trademark manner of his career. Bavaro, a Roman Catholic, would genuflect in the end zone and motion the sign of the cross after each touchdown.

Bavaro performed well during the 1987 season and was again selected to the Pro Bowl. He finished the season with 55 receptions, 867 yards, and 8 touchdowns. In the offseason he underwent surgery to correct turf toe on his right big toe. He followed that season with 53 receptions, 672 yards, and 4 touchdowns in 1988 despite being late to training camp that season due to a contract dispute and his left big toe now being affected by turf toe. After failing to miss a game due to injury in his first four seasons, Bavaro struggled with knee injuries in 1989 and was limited to seven games. He came back to play in 15 games in 1990. The Giants started the season 10–0 and finished 13–3. They advanced to Super Bowl XXV where they played the Buffalo Bills. During the game Bavaro made two key third down receptions to keep scoring drives alive as the Giants won 20–19.

Bavaro struggled with a degenerative knee condition throughout the 1990 season and was rarely able to practice. The Giants cut him in July 1991 because of the injury. After some initial dispute, the Giants signed him to a one-year US$310,000 contract and placed him on the physically unable to perform list. He spent the season as a tight end coach at Saint Dominic Savio High School in East Boston, Massachusetts. He took the position after the team's coach took a chance and wrote Bavaro a letter to ask him if he would consider coaching.

Despite being advised to retire several times by the doctor who worked on his knee, Bavaro managed to secure a contract in 1992 with the Cleveland Browns, who were coached by former Giants assistant coach Bill Belichick. He played one season for the Browns and managed to appear in all 16 games. After the season, he signed with the Philadelphia Eagles. He played in all 16 games again and had 43 receptions, 481 yards, and 6 touchdowns in 1993. After playing one more season for the Eagles he retired in 1995 at the age of 31. Bavaro finished his nine NFL seasons with 351 receptions for 4,733 yards and 39 touchdowns.

In 2011, he was inducted into the New York Giants Ring of Honor.

His career was so influential that ESPN's Mark Bavaro Fantasy Football league is named after him.

In 2022, the Professional Football Researchers Association named Bavaro to the PFRA Hall of Very Good Class of 2022.

== NFL career statistics ==
Legend
| | Won the Super Bowl |
| **Bold** | Career high |

=== Regular season ===
| Year | Team | Games | | Receiving | | | | |
| Year | Team | GP | GS | Rec | Yds | Avg | Lng | TD |
|---|---|---|---|---|---|---|---|---|
| 1985 | NYG | 16 | 16 | 37 | 511 | 13.8 | 32 | 4 |
| 1986 | NYG | 16 | 15 | **66** | **1,001** | 15.2 | 41 | 4 |
| 1987 | NYG | 12 | 12 | 55 | 867 | **15.8** | 38 | **8** |
| 1988 | NYG | 16 | 15 | 53 | 672 | 12.7 | 36 | 4 |
| 1989 | NYG | 7 | 7 | 22 | 278 | 12.6 | 29 | 3 |
| 1990 | NYG | 15 | 15 | 33 | 393 | 11.9 | **61** | 5 |
| 1992 | CLE | 16 | 16 | 25 | 315 | 12.6 | 39 | 2 |
| 1993 | PHI | 16 | 16 | 43 | 481 | 11.2 | 27 | 6 |
| 1994 | PHI | 12 | 11 | 17 | 215 | 12.6 | 27 | 3 |
| | | 126 | 123 | 351 | 4,733 | 13.5 | 61 | 39 |

=== Postseason ===
| Year | Team | Games | | Receiving | | | | |
| Year | Team | GP | GS | Rec | Yds | Avg | Lng | TD |
|---|---|---|---|---|---|---|---|---|
| 1985 | NYG | 2 | 2 | 9 | 103 | 11.4 | 18 | 1 |
| 1986 | NYG | 3 | 3 | 8 | **134** | **16.8** | **30** | **2** |
| 1990 | NYG | 3 | 3 | **13** | 129 | 9.9 | 19 | 0 |
| | | 8 | 8 | 30 | 366 | 12.2 | 30 | 3 |

== Personal life ==
Bavaro married Susan Downes in 1987. The couple have three children. His wife attended Seton Hall Law School for one year, but later transferred to Harvard Law School, where she achieved a degree in Law, and is currently a teacher of European History and constitutional law at St. John's Preparatory School. After his retirement they lived in Naples, Florida for three years. They currently reside in Boxford, Massachusetts, near Bavaro's hometown of Danvers. After his playing career, Bavaro worked in finance for an equity block-trading firm, where he traded large blocks of stocks for different financial institutions. He pursued a career in this field at the suggestion of his former Giants teammate Phil McConkey, who worked for the same company as Bavaro. In 2007, Bavaro was appointed Vice President of DesignCentrix, a premiere Chicago exhibit house. Bavaro is also an avid golfer who considers the sport his favorite pastime.

Throughout his life Bavaro has displayed a humble, low-key, blue collar personality. During the 1986 season, when he emerged as a Pro Bowler, The New York Times columnist Frank Litsky described him by saying, "[h]e is a man of few words, even with teammates. Although he earned $90,000 plus an $85,000 signing bonus last year and will make $125,000 plus incentives this year, he lives a Spartan life. He drives a Chevrolet. His everyday wardrobe features jeans and sneakers. He is humble to a fault." Bavaro is also an anti-abortion activist and was one of 503 people arrested during an anti-abortion rally in 1988. During his NFL career and since his retirement Bavaro has done work as a member of the LifeAthletes organization which promotes abstinence; Bavaro was vice chairman of the group during his playing career. He also befriended and followed the career of Denver Broncos tight end Daniel Graham who idolized Bavaro as a child. Bavaro’s son Lucas also played football being a top player for Dartmouth college.

In 2008, Bavaro published his first novel, Rough & Tumble (ISBN 978-0-312-37574-4), a novel describing the fictional life of Dominic Fucillo in the NFL and the trials and tribulations he faced while playing football.

There is a street named after Bavaro in his hometown of Danvers.

== See also ==
- History of the New York Giants (1979-1993)

== Sources ==
- Faust, Gerry, Heisler, John, and Valdiserri, Roger. Gerry Faust's Tales From The Notre Dame Sideline, Illinois: Sports Publishing LLC. 2004 ISBN 1-58261-399-0
- Faust, Gerry and Love, Steve. The Golden Dream, Illinois: Sports Publishing LLC. 1997 ISBN 1-58261-608-6
