= Northeastern Conference =

The Northeastern Conference (NEC) is a high school athletic conference in District 5 of the Massachusetts Interscholastic Athletic Association.

== Schools ==
In 2019, teams from Everett, Malden, Medford, Revere, and Somerville, left the NEC to rejoin the Greater Boston League (GBL). Revere's football team is scheduled to remain in the NEC until 2020.

Masconomet Regional High School joined the NEC in the fall of 2020. The following twelve schools are a member of the Northeastern Conference.

School	Location	Colors	Type	Enrollment	Nickname
Beverly High School	Beverly, Massachusetts		public secondary	1268	Panthers
Danvers High School	Danvers, Massachusetts		public secondary	1020	Falcons
Gloucester High School	Gloucester, Massachusetts		public secondary	1373	Fishermen
Marblehead High School	Marblehead, Massachusetts		public secondary	994	Magicians
Masconomet Regional High School	Boxford, Massachusetts		public coeducational	1143	Chieftains
Peabody Veterans Memorial High School	Peabody, Massachusetts		public secondary	1943	Tanners
Salem High School	Salem, Massachusetts		public secondary	1359	Witches
Saugus High School	Saugus, Massachusetts		public secondary	-	Sachems
Swampscott High School	Swampscott, Massachusetts		public secondary	-	Big Blue
Winthrop High School	Winthrop, Massachusetts		public secondary	-	Vikings
