= Mike Vincenti =

American judoka

Medal record

Men's Judo

Representing USA

US National Championships
Bronze medal – third place	Bronze	1979

Pan American Championships
Bronze medal – third place	Bronze	1978

US National Championships
Gold medal – first place	Gold	1977

Mike Vincenti is an American judoka from Revere, Massachusetts.

In the US National Judo Championships he won a gold in 1977 and a bronze in 1979. He also won a bronze in the 1978 Pan American Judo Championships.

He trained at the Charlie Chaves Tohoku Judo Club. As a junior, he won the Fifth Annual Kenzo Uyeno Invitational in 1968, the Fifth Annual Massachusetts Judo competition, and the 1977 USJA Young Men's National Championships. In the 1976 Olympic trials, where he lost to Tommy Riggs. He participated in the National AAU Judo Championships the 1977 and 1978.
