= Revere Public Library =

Public library

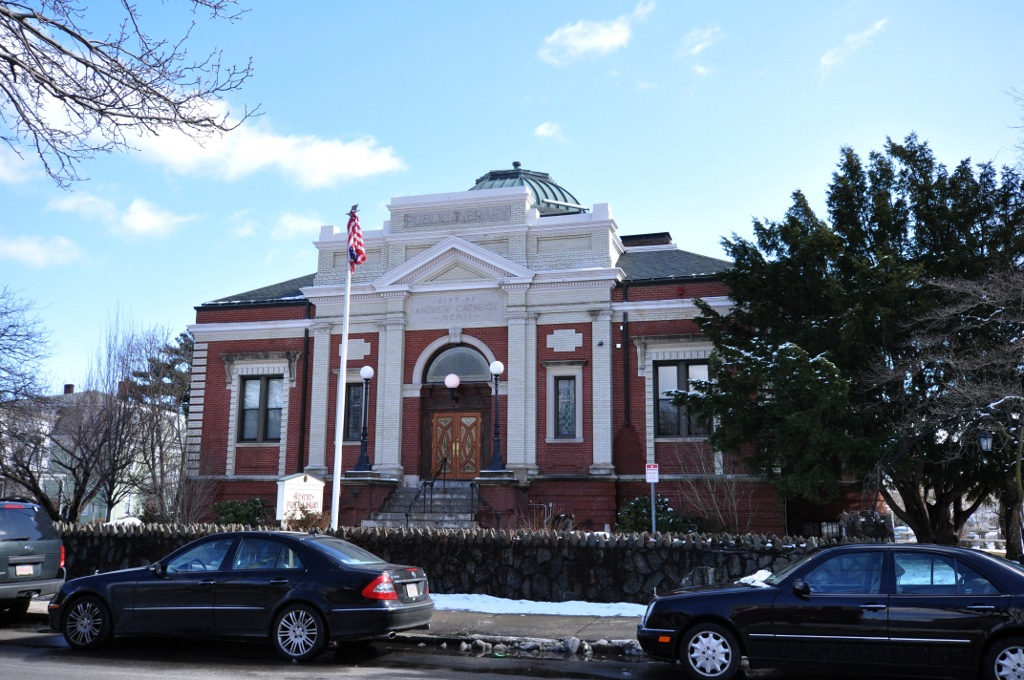
- Revere Public Library in 2013
- 42°24′29″N 71°00′33″W
- Location: 179 Beach Street; Revere, Massachusetts
- Type: Public library
- Established: November 18, 1903

Other information
- Website: reverepubliclibrary.org

The Revere Public Library is a municipal public library in Revere, Massachusetts. It is a member of the North of Boston Library Exchange. The library is an example of a Carnegie library. The current building sits on the corner of Beach Street and Library Street.

== History ==
The first library in what is now the City of Revere was known as the Chelsea Social Library. The exact date and location of the original library is uncertain, although it was established some time between 1825 and 1830. The bulk of the collection of this library was donated by Rev. Joseph Tuckerman and the Cary family. On April 5, 1840, it was decided in a town meeting that the Chelsea Social Library would be relocated to the town hall, which was itself built only five years earlier, on Broadway and Pleasant Street, in 1835.

The Old Town Hall, as it was to become known, burned to the ground on January 19, 1897. Of a collection of 5313, about two thousand books were water damaged. What remained was moved to the Sherman Hannah block on Broadway. The library was closed for about a month after the fire and was relocated to the basement of the new town hall.

A year before the destruction of the Old Town Hall, in 1896, the Revere Women's Club had begun a fund for the erection of a public library building. Samantha Sparhawk (1840 - 1904), president of the club, met with Andrew Carnegie during a family vacation in Europe. In conjunction with Ernest H. Pierce, editor of the local newspaper, the Revere Journal, they procured a gift of $20,000 from Carnegie. The donation was officially accepted at a town meeting on November 11, 1901. Upon Carnegie's death in 1919, then Revere Mayor Walsworth ordered the flag on Revere Public Library placed at half mast.

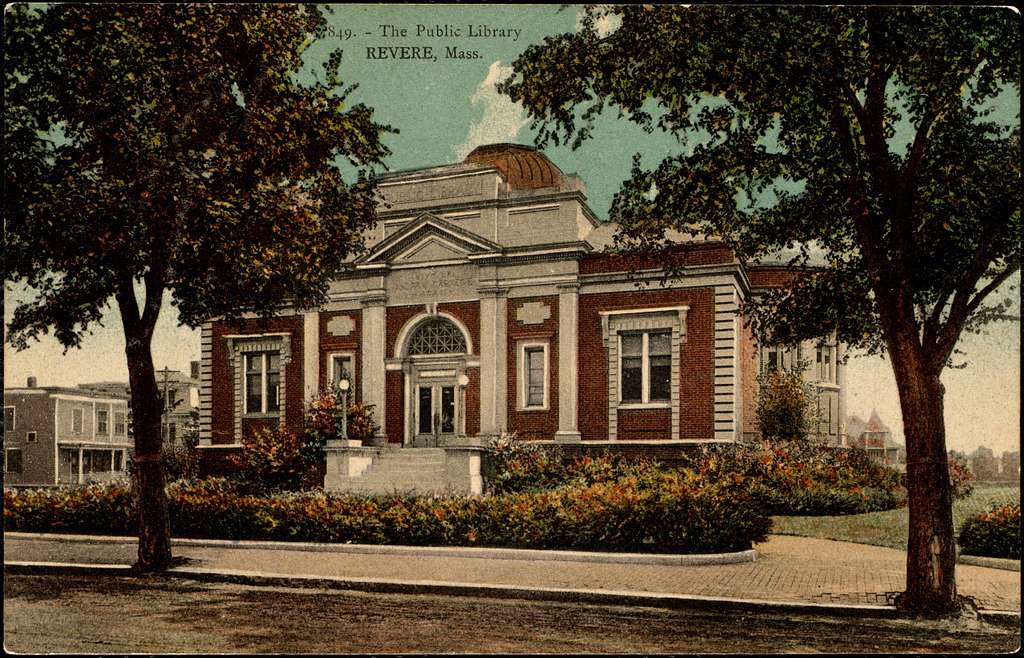
Revere Public Library vintage postcard

The current building was built in 1902 and officially opened on November 18, 1903. It is representative of the Georgian Revival and American Renaissance styles of architecture and is one of few Carnegie libraries to have never been expanded.

At its founding, the library received a number of gifts. These included a marble drinking fountain from Theodore Grover, a stained glass window from the Current Events Club of Beachmont, and a pair of andirons from Warren Fenno, a prominent town clerk.

Harriet Tewksbury Fenno, who began as an assistant librarian in the Old Town Hall in 1881, became head librarian with the library's expansion in 1891 and served in this position for thirty-seven years, until her death on May 26, 1928. She was succeeded by Nina E. Cross.
