= Danvers High School =

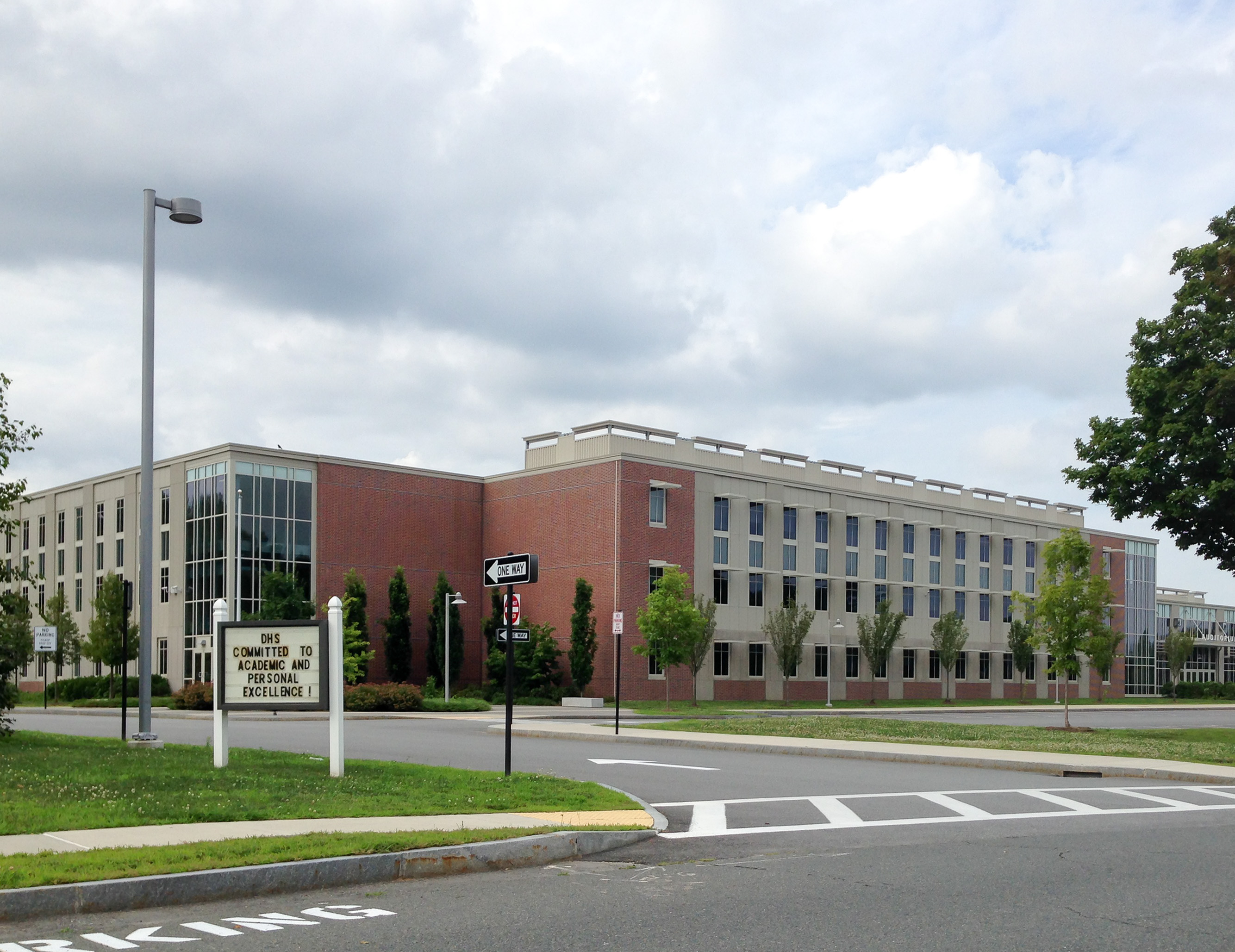

Location
- 60 Cabot Road; Danvers, MA 01923; United States; 42°34′56″N 70°55′53″W

Information
- Type: Comprehensive high school
- Motto: "Ladies and Gentlemen Always"
- Established: 1962
- School district: Danvers Public Schools
- Superintendent: Dr. Daniel Bower
- Principal: Alan Strauss
- Teaching staff: 76.51 (on full-time equivalent (FTE) basis)
- Grades: 9–12
- Enrollment: 798 (2023-2024)
- Student to teacher ratio: 10.43
- Hours in school day: 7:30am - 1:55pm
- Campus size: 46 acres
- Campus type: Single Building
- Colors: Royal blue and white
- Fight song: Victory's Falcon (Played by the Falcon Marching band at home games and meets)
- Athletics conference: Northeastern Conference (NEC)
- Mascot: Falcon
- Rival: Gloucester Beverly
- Accreditation: New England Association of Schools and Colleges
- Newspaper: The Flying Onion
- Feeder schools: Holten-Richmond Middle School; Danvers Elementary Schools
- Website: School website

Danvers High School (DHS) is a public high school in Danvers, Massachusetts, United States. It is part of the Danvers Public Schools school district.

== Demographics ==
Student enrolment for the 2024-25 school year (Grades 9-12) was 784. The school employs 74.13 Full-Time Equivalent (FTE) teachers. The ratio of teachers to students is 10.48.

== History ==
Opened in September 1962, Danvers High School was the successor to Holten High School. This had opened in 1855 originally in the town hall, with 67 students. It had been funded by the Danvers Prudential Committee.

Danvers High School received national (and later international) attention in 2009 when use of the word "meep" by students was forbidden, due to its disruptive use by some students. Principal Thomas Murray banned the word, and threatened police action over its use in either speech or on clothing.

In June 2010, The Boston Globe commended the speech "Operation Red Sprinkles" by DHS Salutatorian Anisha Shenai (class of 2010), as one of the most e-mailed inspirational articles at Boston.com.

In 2010, the school began a renovation project which was finished in time for the 2013-2014 school year. With a cost of $70 million, roughly half of it going to the Massachusetts School Building Authority, the project saw updates to the auditorium, the field house, the Vye Gym and the general classroom wing. New sections included the library, the cafeteria, the science labs, the engineering labs, the administration offices, and the chorus and band rooms. It was the first major change the school since its initial construction in 1962.

=== Murder of Colleen Ritzer ===
On October 22, 2013, math teacher Colleen Ritzer, 24, was murdered in a restroom at the school. Ritzer's body was found dumped about 20 feet into the woods behind the northeastern Massachusetts high school’s athletic fields. Student Philip Chism, then 14, was arraigned in her death. On November 21, 2013, Chism was indicted on charges of murder, aggravated rape and armed robbery. Chism was charged as an adult and, on December 15, 2015, a jury found him guilty of first-degree murder, aggravated rape and armed robbery. On February 26, 2016, he was sentenced to life in prison with eligibility for parole in 40 years.

The school was given additional financial support by the U.S. Department of Education to help it recover from the murder.

== Academics ==
Danvers High School offers the following levels of instruction: College Preparatory and Honors, Accelerated and Advanced Placement coursework. Standardized tests include the PSAT, SAT, SAT II, ACT, AP and MCAS.

== Assistant superintendent and principal ==
The positions of assistant superintendent and principals were merged in 2011, and then replaced by the position of principal in 2017.

- ? - 2010: Tim Murray (high school principal)
- 2010 - 2017: Susan Ambrozavitch (assistant superintendent of schools and high school principal)
- 2017 - 2021: Dr. Jason Colombino (high school principal)
- 2021 - 2024: Adam Federico (high school principal)
- 2024 - 2025 : Peter DiMauro (interim high school principal)
- 2025 - present: Alan Strauss (high school principal)

== Athletics ==
The school plays under the Danvers Falcons moniker and competes in the Northeastern Conference of District A in the Massachusetts Interscholastic Athletic Association. The school fields teams in seven spring sports, eight fall sports, and 10 winter sports.

== Marching band ==
The Falcon Marching Band has played at the New York City St. Patrick's Day Parade and at the Veterans Day Parade in Boston, Massachusetts.

== Notable alumni ==
- David Bavaro, former professional football player
- Mark Bavaro, former professional football player
- Nick DiPaolo, comedian
- Brad Delp, former lead singer for the rock group Boston
- Nick Hennessey, college football coach
- Edward N. Robinson, College Football Hall of Fame inductee
- Theodore Speliotis, member of the Massachusetts House of Representatives for the 13th Essex District

== Bibliography ==
- Ladies and Gentlemen Always: The Illustrated Story of Holten High School, Richard P. Zollo and Virginia Sherry Zollo (1994)
