= Mark Parisi =

American cartoonist

Mark Parisi (born 1961) is the creator of Off the Mark, a comic panel which began in 1987 and now appears in 100 newspapers, as well as on greeting cards, T-shirts, and more. Off the Mark is distributed daily by Universal Press Syndicate. Parisi's work is influenced by Charles Schulz, Gary Larson and MAD magazine. Parisi has also said he admires the work of cartoonists Jim Meddick, Sergio Aragonés, and Garry Trudeau, among others.

In addition, Parisi is the author and illustrator of the Marty Pants middle-grade novel series, and The Truth About 5th Grade middle-grade book (this one co-authored by Kim Tomsic), all for HarperCollins.

== Background ==
Parisi began drawing when he was very young, and frequently copied comic strips out of newspapers. Parisi said that after reading Charles Schulz' comic strip Peanuts, he "immediately wanted to draw it." At Salem State University, he changed his major several times before settling on Art, with a concentration in Graphic Art.

== Awards ==
In 2025, Parisi won The Reuben for Outstanding Cartoonist of the Year from the National Cartoonists Society. In 2008, 2011, 2017, and 2020 Parisi won Best Newspaper Panel for his Off the Mark (comic strip) from the National Cartoonists Society. He also was nominated for the award in 2004, 2006, 2013, 2016, and 2019. In addition, he has won awards for his work in greeting cards. In 2013, he won Best Greeting Cards from the National Cartoonists Society, and in 2022, he won a Louie Award from The Greeting Card Association.
