= Off the Mark (comic strip) =

American comic strip by Mark Parisi

- Author: Mark Parisi
- Website: www.offthemark.com
- Current status/schedule: Current daily strip
- Launch date: September 10, 1987; 38 years ago
- Syndicate(s): United Feature Syndicate/Universal Uclick/Andrews McMeel Syndication
- Genre: Humor

Off The Mark is a comic panel created by Mark Parisi which began in September 1987 and now appears in 100 newspapers. It also appears on greeting cards, in magazines, on T-shirts and more. Off The Mark is distributed daily by Andrews McMeel Syndication.

The humor of this comic panel focuses on off-beat, slice-of-life situations. Andrews McMeel Universal describes it as: "A world of scheming pets, evil computers, and talking plants that puts an ironic, absurd or just plain silly spin on everyday life."

Off The Mark was named "Best Newspaper Panel" by the National Cartoonists Society in 2008, 2011, 2017, and 2020. It was also nominated in 2004, 2006, 2013, 2016 and 2019. Off The Mark greeting cards were named "Best Greeting Cards" by the National Cartoonists Society in 2013.
