= Revere, Massachusetts =

- City
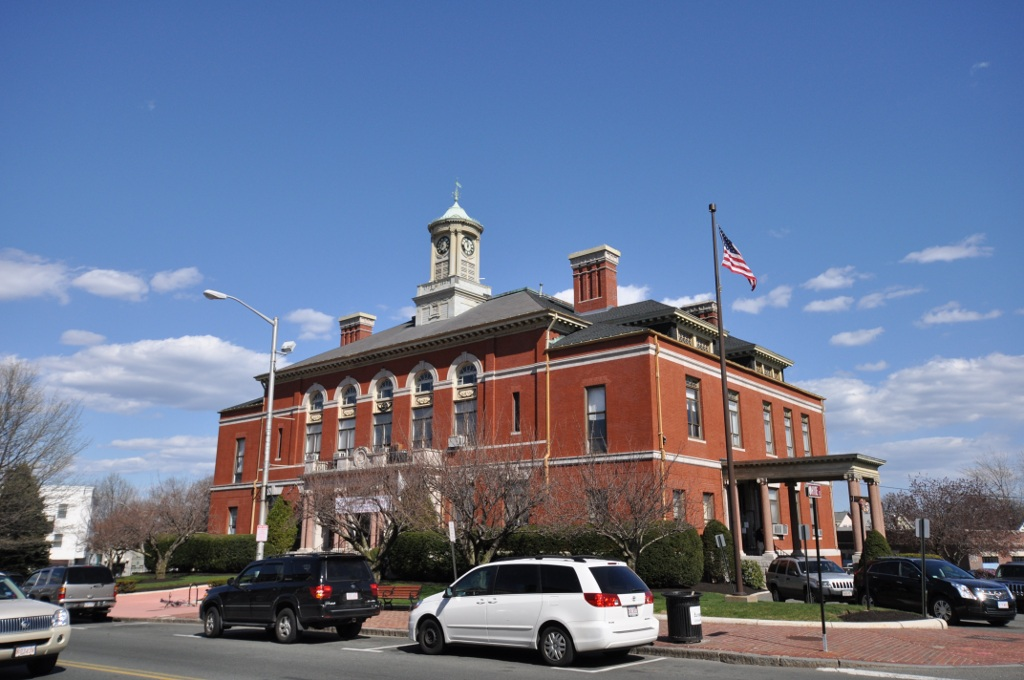
- City Hall

- Seal

- Location in Suffolk County and the state of Massachusetts

- Location in the United States
- Coordinates: 42°24′30″N 71°00′45″W
- Country: United States
- State: Massachusetts
- County: Suffolk
- Settled: 1630
- Incorporated: March 19, 1846
- Name change: March 24, 1871
- City: November 3, 1914

Government
  - Type: Mayor–council
  - Mayor: Patrick M. Keefe, Jr.
  - City council president: Anthony Zambuto
  - City councillors: Robert J. Haas, III; Michelle Kelley; Marc Silvestri; Anthony Zambuto; Joanne McKenna; Jim Mercurio; Ira Novoselsky; Anthony Cogliandro; Paul Argenzio; Angela Guarino-Sawaya; Chris Giannino

Area
  - Total: 10.13 sq mi (26.24 km^{2})
  - Land: 5.70 sq mi (14.77 km^{2})
  - Water: 4.43 sq mi (11.47 km^{2})
- Elevation: 20 ft (6 m)

Population (2020)
  - Total: 62,186
  - Density: 10,902.5/sq mi (4,209.46/km^{2})
- Time zone: UTC−5 (Eastern)
  - Summer (DST): UTC−4 (Eastern)
- ZIP Code: 02151
- Area code: 339 / 781
- FIPS code: 25-56585
- GNIS feature ID: 0612810
- Website: www.revere.org

Revere (/rəˈviːr/, locally /rɪˈviːə/) is a city in Suffolk County, Massachusetts. Located approximately 5 miles (8.0 km) northeast of Downtown Boston, Revere is the terminus of the MBTA Blue Line, with three stations located within the city: Wonderland, Revere Beach, and Beachmont. The city borders Massachusetts Bay, and was the site of the Battle of Chelsea Creek. Revere Beach, a three mile (4.8 km) stretch of beach on the city's eastern coast, is the oldest public beach in the United States.

Revere is one of the oldest communities in the United States. Originally known as Rumney Marsh, in reference to the 600-acre salt marsh located within the Saugus and Pines River Inlet, present-day Revere was part of Boston from 1632 until 1739, when it became part of Chelsea. Revere and neighboring, present-day Winthrop separated from Chelsea and were established as the town of North Chelsea in 1846. In 1852, part of North Chelsea was established as the town of Winthrop. What remained of North Chelsea was renamed in 1871 for Paul Revere, a Revolutionary War patriot and the eponymous subject of Henry Wadsworth Longfellow's 1861 poem, "Paul Revere's Ride". In 1914, the Town of Revere voted to become a city. It was incorporated as the City of Revere with the inauguration of its first mayor on January 4, 1915. As of the 2020 census, the city had a population of 62,186 inhabitants.

== History ==
The area's earliest known inhabitants were Native Americans belonging to the Pawtucket tribe and were known to colonists as the "Rumney Marsh Indians." This group was said to reside on the edges of the Rumney Marsh marshland. However, the origin of the name that is used for the marshland even to this day, is unclear. Nanepashemet, known to colonists as "Sagamore George," was the leader, or Great Sachem of the Pawtucket Confederation of Abenaki People of Lynn (which at that time included present day Revere). One branch of Nanepashemet's family is thought to have taken "Rumney Marsh" as their surname.

In 1616, an epidemic, probably smallpox, swept the region, killing thousands in its wake. Nanepashemet retired to the Mystic River, in what is now Medford, but was found murdered in 1619 at his fort on the brow of Rock Hill overlooking the river. Three sons succeeded him in his reign. One of them, Wonohaquaham, also called "Sagamore John," had jurisdiction over the Native Americans at Winnisemmit (later Chelsea) and Rumney Marsh.

In 1624, Samuel Maverick became the first colonist to settle in the area. He built his house at the site of the former Chelsea Naval Hospital (or Admiral's Hill). On June 17, 1630, John Winthrop, the first governor of the Massachusetts Bay Company in New England joined him there for dinner.

On September 25, 1634, Rumney Marsh was annexed to Boston, which had received its name only four years earlier. Winnisemmet (current Chelsea) and Pullen Point (current Winthrop) were also annexed to Boston.

Rumney Marsh was originally divided and allotted to twenty-one of Boston's most prominent citizens. By 1639, the original allotments had been consolidated into seven great farms. Farming was the principal industry of Winnisemmet, and Rumney Marsh in particular.

The first county road in North America stretched across Rumney Marsh from the Winnisemmet Ferry to Olde Salem in 1641.

During King Philip's War (also known as Metacomet's War), which lasted from 1675 to 1678, the local Native Americans were forcibly removed to what is now Deer Island, where half of those imprisoned died of starvation or exposure. Some were enlisted to help the colonists defeat other native tribes.

In 1739, Rumney Marsh, Winnisemmet and Pullen Point were set off from Boston and established as the Town of Chelsea. The largest of the three settlements, Rumney Marsh (later to become North Chelsea) was selected as the Town Center.

In 1775, the area played a small role in the American Revolution during the Battle of Chelsea Creek, one of the first naval battles of the revolution.

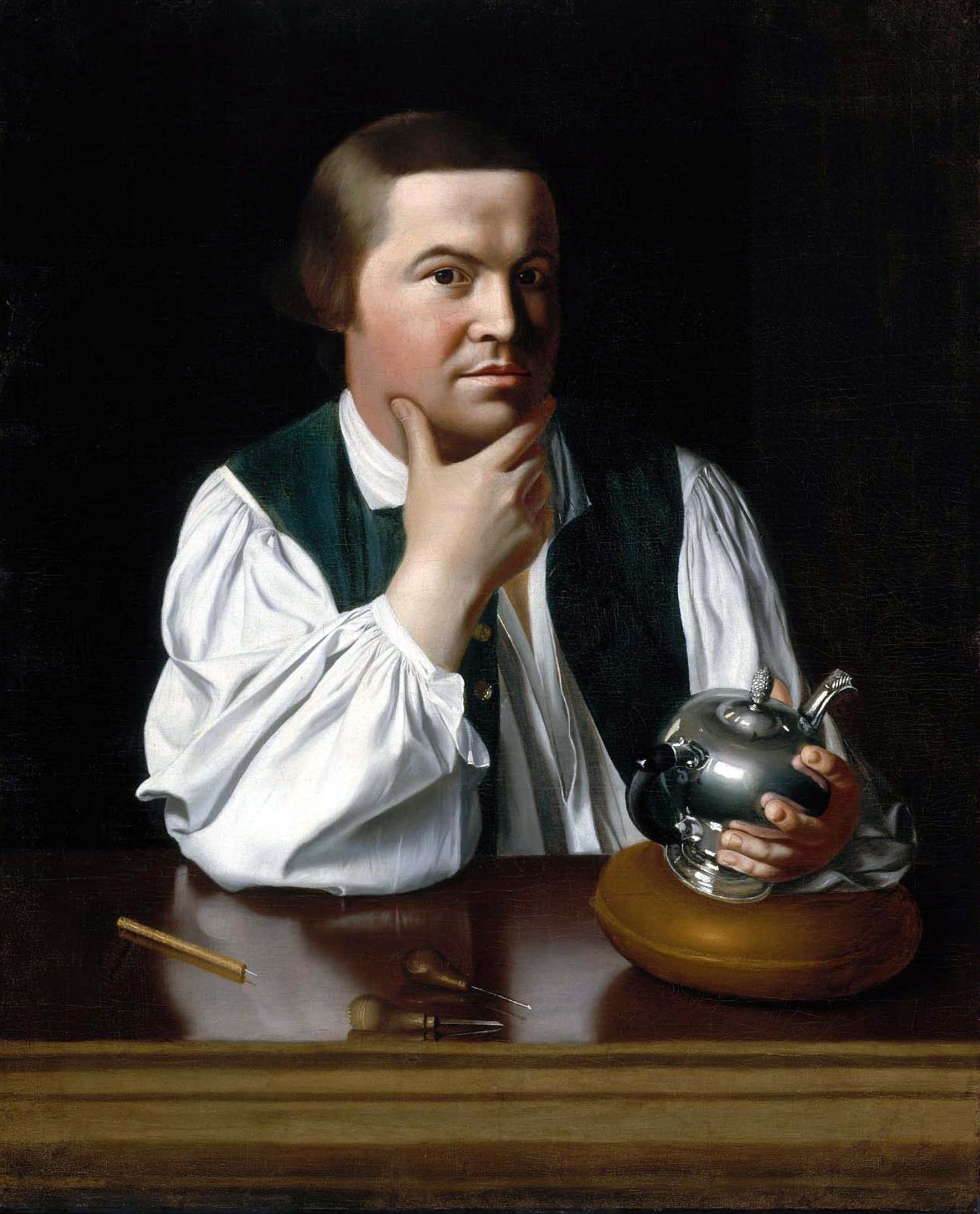
1768 portrait of Paul Revere by John Singleton Copley

In 1846, the town of North Chelsea was established. In 1852, Pullen Point seceded from North Chelsea and was established as the town of Winthrop. That same year, Chelsea became its own city. On March 24, 1871, a petition went into effect, changing the name of North Chelsea to the Town of Revere in honor of Paul Revere (1735–1818), the son of an immigrant who took part in the American Revolutionary War. Paul Revere had gained popularity after the publication of Henry Wadsworth Longfellow's 1860 poem "Paul Revere's Ride".

Later in 1871, Revere was the site of The Great Revere Train Wreck of 1871, the deadliest railroad incident in Massachusetts history up to that point, when the Eastern Railroad's "Portland Express" slammed into the back of a stopped local commuter train at Revere Station.

Revere may be most well known for its beach. In 1896, Revere Beach became the first public beach in the United States.

On November 2, 1914, the Town of Revere held its final town meeting, as voters had chosen to become the City of Revere. Revere became a city with the inauguration of its first mayor, Arthur B. Curtis, on January 4, 1915. A detailed account of the occasion is given in The History of the Town of Revere as Compiled by Benjamin Shurtleff, 1937:

"Selections were rendered by the Shubert Male Quartet. Mr. Theodore W. Gillette read an historical essay. Miss Anna George, a Beachmont school teacher, sang "The Sword of Bunker Hill," and George Arthur Sackett recited "The Midnight Ride of Paul Revere." This poem was previously recited when North Chelsea changed her name to Revere and then again, in 1899, at the dedication of the town hall. In the evening from 8.30 to 9, a reception to the Mayor was held, and then followed a grand ball and banquet. The grand march, headed by the Mayor, started at nine o'clock; and it was long toward two on Tuesday morning before the party broke up."

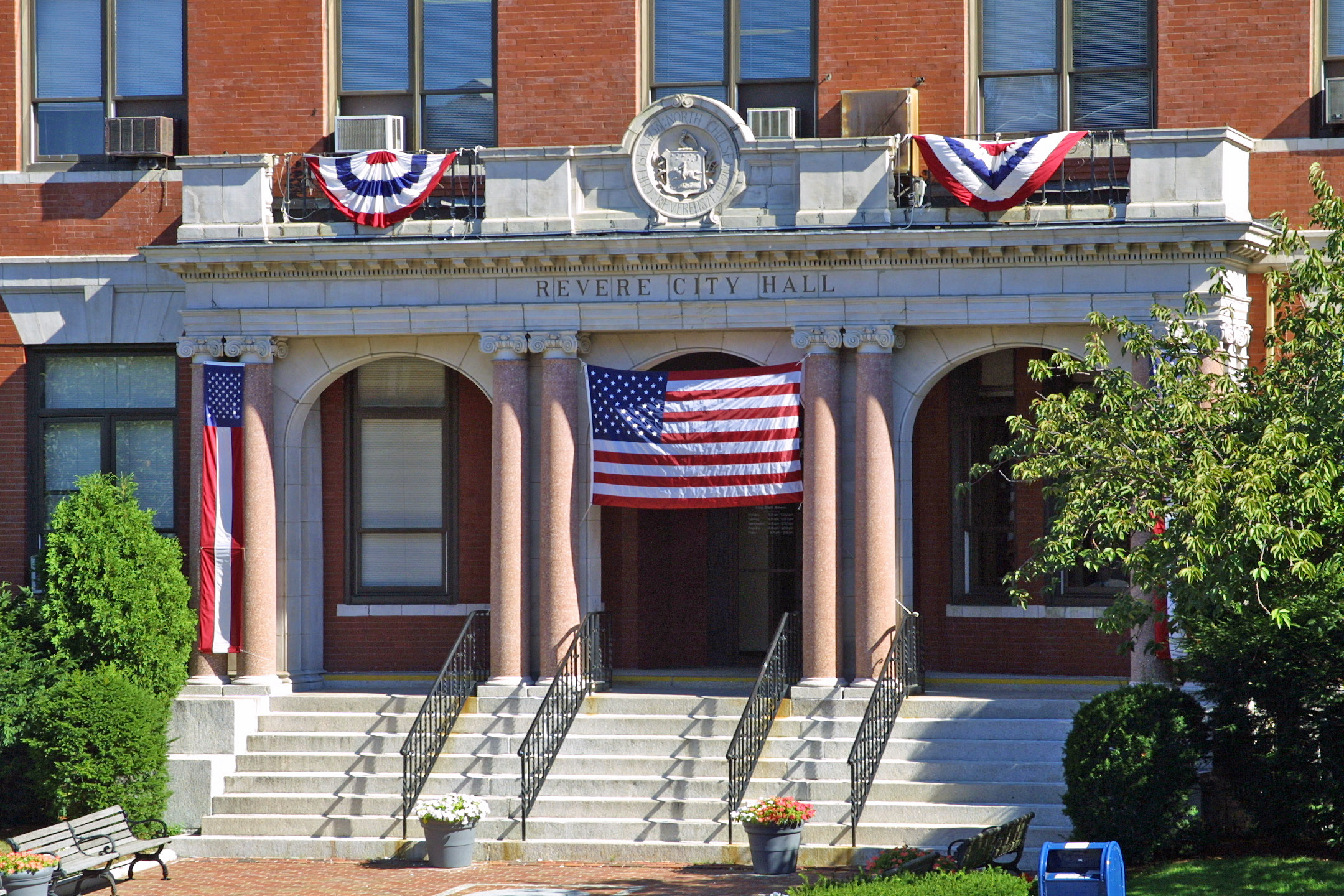
Revere City Hall days after the September 11 attacks

On the morning of July 28, 2014, an EF2 tornado touched down in nearby Chelsea and intensified as it entered the city of Revere, causing major damage to many buildings, including the Revere City Hall. It was the first tornado to hit Suffolk County since the National Weather Service began keeping records in 1950.

=== History of Immigration ===
"In 1637 the Massachusetts General Court adopted an order that no person or town should receive or entertain a newcomer for more than three weeks without permission. In addition to the desire to keep their colony Puritan, they were also concerned with the immigration of paupers. In subsequent years a law was passed that restricted the immigration of 'lame, impotent, or infirmed persons.' Hardly any immigrants came to Massachusetts during the second half of the 17th century."

English immigration came to a near-complete stop in 1642 as a result of the English Civil War, but was replaced with immigration from other European countries.

In 1687, only 31 people lived in the settlements of Winnisimmit, Rumney Marsh, and Pullen Point. In 1739, when these settlements were separated from Boston and formed the Town of Chelsea, there were 10 homes in Winnisimmit (Chelsea), 26 in Rumney Marsh (Revere), and 4 homes in Pullen Point (Winthrop), with 267 inhabitants in total. This number quadrupled by 1837, at which time 1,201 people resided on the land.

Rumney Marsh Burying Ground in Revere contains the graves of 16 formerly enslaved Black people; a plaque there lists their names, dates of death, and approximate ages.

Between 1837 and 1840, the population nearly doubled due to the second major wave of immigration into the area.

"During this period of time more than 750,000 Irish, British and German immigrants arrived in America; and another 4.3 million immigrants came from these countries during the next 20 years. Of the total number of immigrants to America during the second wave, 40 percent were from Ireland, escaping poverty and famine in their native country."

"By 1905 the Italian population in Revere had grown large enough that the first Italian Catholic Parish of Saint Anthony of Padua was founded in a three-family dwelling on Revere Street. It was clear in 1905 that the Italian population of Revere was rapidly becoming the fastest growing ethnic group in the town."

At this time, "only 19 percent of the immigrants entering the U.S. were from northern Europe, while 81 percent were from southern, eastern, and central Europe," and "nearly 60 percent of the births in the Town of Revere were to foreign born parents."

==== Jewish immigration ====
The first Jewish residents of Revere were Russian and Polish immigrants, of whom there were 137 in 1885 and 1,646 by 1915.

Revere's first Jewish congregation was established in 1906, when the Temple B’Nai Israel was founded. The second was established ten years later when "Congregation Tiffereth Israel purchased the Methodist Episcopal Society's church at the corner of Shirley and Nahant Avenue."

In 1940, Jewish residents accounted for about 25% of the City of Revere's population.

"Most of the Jews in Revere were concentrated around Shirley Avenue, which was the center of activity at that time. With Jewish businesses, synagogues and kosher markets, it represented the vibrancy of Jewish life, faith and culture in Revere. On Saturday night, all of the Jewish-owned businesses on Shirley Ave. would reopen after Shabbat and the streets would once again be filled with the vibrancy of Jewish life at that time."

==== 21st century ====
As of 2000, the city had the 19th highest percentage of Brazilians in the U.S. (tied with Sea Ranch Lakes, Florida, and Malden, Massachusetts) at 1.7% of the population.

As of 2010, 27% of the residents of Revere were born outside of the United States. Many of them originate from North Africa, Asia, Europe, and Latin America. The 2010 percentage of foreign born residents is twice that of 1990.

In May 2017, the city was host to its first Moroccan Cultural Day celebration, which took place on Shirley Avenue. The city's Moroccan community was estimated to account for at least 10% of the population, as of May 2019. Following the outbreak of the coronavirus pandemic, the community organization, "Moroccan American Connections in Revere" (MACIR) supplied the city with hand-made protective masks.

== Geography and transportation ==
Revere borders the towns of Winthrop to the southeast, the city of Chelsea to the southwest, the Boston neighborhood of East Boston to the south, Everett and Malden to the west, Saugus and Lynn to the north, and the Atlantic Ocean to the east. According to the United States Census Bureau, the city has a total area of 10 square miles (26 km^{2}), of which 5.9 square miles (15 km^{2}) is land and 4.1 square miles (11 km^{2}) (40.98%) is water.

The completion in 1838 of the Eastern Railroad (later the Boston & Maine), and in 1875 of the Boston, Revere Beach & Lynn Railroad, signaled the beginning of rapid population growth for the town and the development of the beach as a summer resort.

The MBTA Blue Line terminates in Revere, with stops at Wonderland, Revere Beach, and Beachmont.

U.S. Route 1 and state highways 1A, 16, 60, 107, and 145 run through Revere.

== Climate ==
Throughout the year in Revere, temperatures generally range from 23 °F to 82 °F, rarely dipping below 9 °F or exceeding 91 °F.

Rainfall is consistent year-round in Revere, with October typically being the wettest month, averaging 3.9 inches, and January being the driest, with an average of 2.3 inches. Snowfall spans about 5.0 months, from November 12 to April 10, with at least 1.0 inch of snow over a 31-day period. January tends to see the most snow, averaging 8.3 inches.

The perceived humidity in Revere varies significantly by season. Muggy conditions persist for about 3.3 months, from June 11 to September 21, where comfort level is considered muggy, oppressive, or miserable at least 10% of the time. July sees the most muggy days, with around 10.2 days fitting this description.

== Demographics ==
Historical population
Year	Pop.	±%
1850	935	—
1860	921	−1.5%
1870	1,197	+30.0%
1880	2,263	+89.1%
1890	5,668	+150.5%
1900	10,395	+83.4%
1910	18,219	+75.3%
1920	28,823	+58.2%
1930	35,680	+23.8%
1940	34,405	−3.6%
1950	36,763	+6.9%
1960	40,080	+9.0%
1970	43,159	+7.7%
1980	42,423	−1.7%
1990	42,786	+0.9%
2000	47,283	+10.5%
2010	51,755	+9.5%
2020	62,186	+20.2%
2024*	60,702	−2.4%
* = population estimate. Source: United States census records and Population Estimates Program data. Source: U.S. Decennial Census

=== 2020 census ===
As of the 2020 census, Revere had a population of 62,186. The median age was 37.3 years. 20.4% of residents were under the age of 18 and 14.1% of residents were 65 years of age or older. For every 100 females there were 97.0 males, and for every 100 females age 18 and over there were 95.9 males age 18 and over.

100.0% of residents lived in urban areas, while 0.0% lived in rural areas.

There were 23,050 households in Revere, of which 32.6% had children under the age of 18 living in them. Of all households, 39.2% were married-couple households, 22.2% were households with a male householder and no spouse or partner present, and 30.8% were households with a female householder and no spouse or partner present. About 28.5% of all households were made up of individuals and 11.6% had someone living alone who was 65 years of age or older.

There were 24,539 housing units, of which 6.1% were vacant. The homeowner vacancy rate was 0.6% and the rental vacancy rate was 5.5%.

Racial composition as of the 2020 census
Race	Number	Percent
White	30,541	49.1%
Black or African American	3,258	5.2%
American Indian and Alaska Native	425	0.7%
Asian	3,483	5.6%
Native Hawaiian and Other Pacific Islander	29	0.0%
Some other race	14,838	23.9%
Two or more races	9,612	15.5%
Hispanic or Latino (of any race)	23,175	37.3%

Following the 2020 United States census, Revere became the fastest growing city in Massachusetts.

=== 2019 American Community Survey ===
According to the 2019 American Community Survey 5-Year Estimates, the median household income in the city was $62,568, and the median family income was $72,656. Males had a median income of $36,881 versus $31,300 for females. The per capita income for the city was $30,587. About 10.2% of families and 12.7% of the population were below the poverty line, including 17.9% of those under age 18 and 13.3% of those age 65 or over.

== Government ==
=== Local ===
The City of Revere elects a mayor, city council, and school committee. The mayor is elected to a four-year term and also serves as chair of the school committee. The current mayor of Revere is Patrick M. Keefe Jr. The Revere City Council is made up of eleven members, five at-large councilors and six ward councilors. City Councillors are elected to two-year terms. Revere also elects its own school committee, which is made up of seven members total.

=== State ===
Revere has two representatives in the Massachusetts House of Representatives and one in the Massachusetts Senate. State Representatives Jessica Giannino, Sixteenth Suffolk District, and Jeffrey Turco, Nineteenth Suffolk District, represent Revere in the House. State Senator Lydia Edwards, First Suffolk and Middlesex District, represents Revere in the Senate.

== Education ==
Revere Public Schools operates the city's public schools. High school students attend either the Revere High School, Northeast Metropolitan Regional Vocational High School or City lab High School. Some students attend local charter schools in other cities such as the Pioneer Charter School of Science. There are three public middle schools: the Garfield School, Susan B. Anthony Middle School, and the Rumney Marsh Academy. Private Pre-K–8 schools include Eagle Heights Academy and Immaculate Conception.

== Economy ==
=== Economic development ===
In 2018, the City of Revere announced the launch of 'Next Stop, Revere' the city's first comprehensive master plan in over 40 years, in partnership with the Metropolitan Area Planning Council. 'Next Stop, Revere' involved input from residents, officials, and community partners, and outlined a vision for the next 10–20 years of the city's future. A main focal point of this plan involved economic development. A number of goals were outlined including developing Revere's workforce, supporting small businesses, attracting science and technology industries, supporting industry, and supporting local entrepreneurs.

=== Employment ===
According to the City of Revere's 2021 Budget proposed by the mayor's office, the top employers in the city are:

Largest Employers
#	Name	Nature of Business	# of Employees
1	Market Basket	Supermarket	210
2	Mass General Hospital	Medical	200
3	Price Rite	Supermarket	183
4	Lighthouse Nursing	Nursing	182
5	Target	Retail	170
6	Stop & Shop (Squire Road)	Supermarket	150
7	Annemark Nursing (closed 2021)	Nursing Home	135
8	Showcase Cinema (closed 2020)	Cinemas	103
9	OceanAir	Shipping/Logistics	100

== Neighborhoods and sites of interest ==
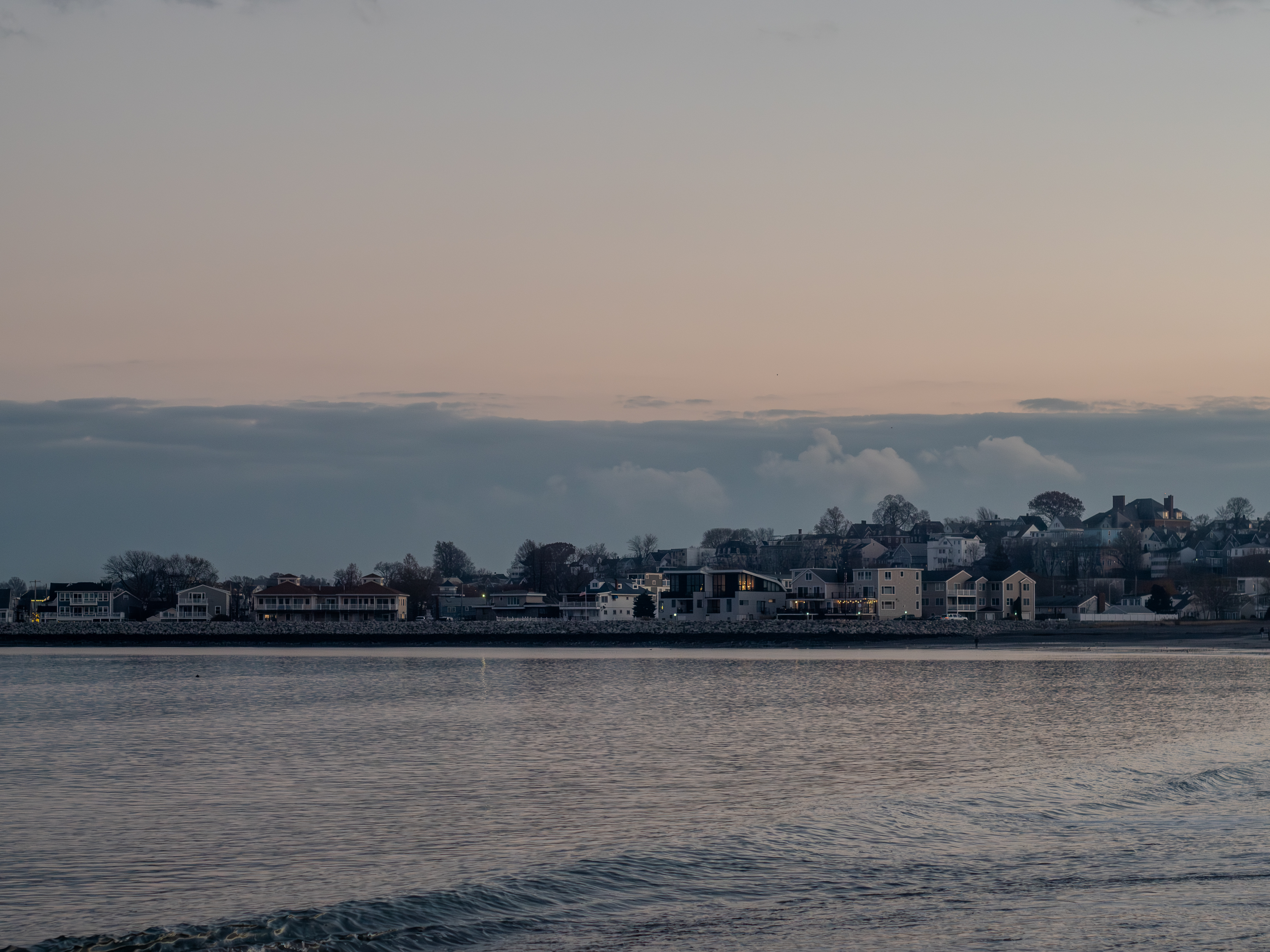
Beachmont in 2025, viewed from Revere Beach.

Revere is home to several distinct neighborhoods and districts:

=== Beachmont ===
Beachmont is Revere's most easterly neighborhood, situated between Revere Beach Boulevard and East Boston's Orient Heights. It is home to a diverse ethnic population and a mixture of single and multi-family homes, apartments, and local businesses.

=== Broadway ===
Broadway is Revere's central civic, commercial, and travel artery. It is home to a variety of small businesses, residences, and public buildings like Revere City Hall. It is accessible from all sides of the city and is a popular route for those traveling to neighboring municipalities like Saugus, Lynn, and Chelsea.

=== Oak Island ===
Oak Island is located near the Point of Pines and the end of Revere Beach. It is primarily home to single and multi-family homes and neighbors Revere's marsh and wetlands.

=== Point of Pines ===
Point of Pines is located at the end of Revere Beach and is primarily home to single and multi-family homes. Residents of the Point of Pines neighborhood have access to their own private portion of Revere Beach.

=== Revere Beach Boulevard ===
Revere Beach Boulevard runs directly along Revere Beach. It is home to a mixture of apartment complexes, restaurants, and single-family homes. New development along the beach has also brought the rise of luxury apartments and fine-dining restaurants to the district.

=== Revere Street ===
Connecting Broadway to Revere Beach, Revere Street is a main travel artery for those commuting across both sides of the city. It is home to a number of local businesses restaurants, barbershops, and convenience stores.

=== Shirley Avenue ===
The Shirley Avenue neighborhood has a long history of welcoming Revere's immigrant populations. Over time, it has been home to the has been home to the city's Jewish, European, Latin American, African, and Cambodian communities. It is the most ethnically diverse part of the city and is home to various ethnic grocery stores, restaurants, and community services.

=== West Revere ===
West Revere primarily consists of single and multi-family homes. Aside from residential development, West Revere is also home to the Squire Road business district which contains a mixture of large shopping plazas, restaurants, and hotels.

=== Nature Reservations ===
==== Revere Beach ====
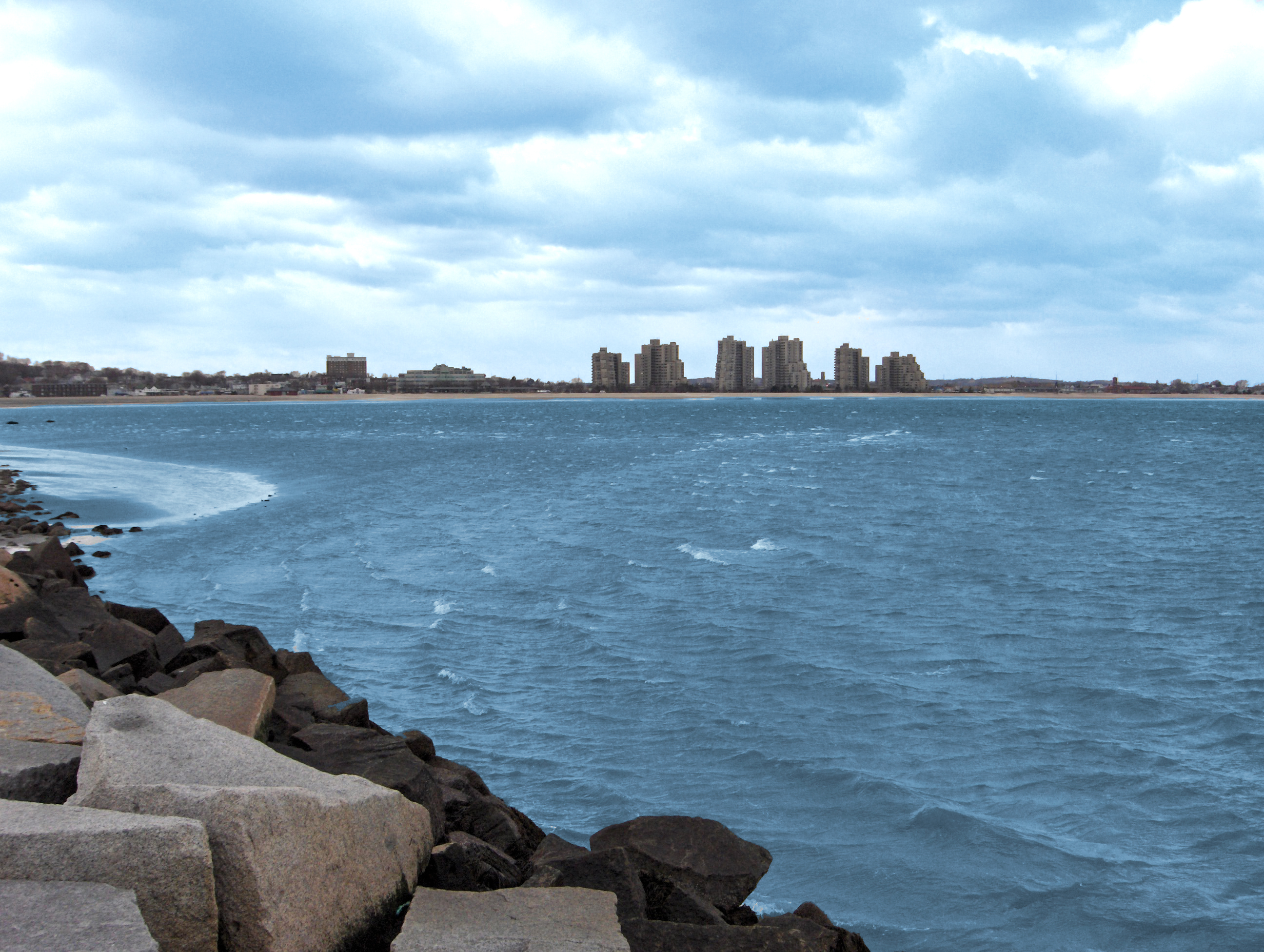
View of Revere Beach in 2006

Revere Beach is considered the oldest public beach in the United States. In 1896, the Metropolitan Park Commission (now part of the Massachusetts Department of Conservation and Recreation) assumed management of the beach, removed hundreds of privately owned structures, and redesigned the area between present day Elliot Circle and Point of Pines. The layout of the beach was created by Charles Elliot, for whom Elliot Circle is named. The beach remained a popular summer destination, growing in popularity and gaining a wide array of amusement rides and attractions until the middle of the 20th century. A steady decline in popularity was met with a finishing blow during the Blizzard of 1978, as many of the remaining businesses and infrastructure were destroyed.

The beach was the focus of a major revitalization effort throughout the 1980s and was officially reopened in May 1992. It now boasts high-rise housing units, a re-sanded beach, restored pavilions, and a renovated boulevard. Revere commemorated the centennial of the first opening of Revere Beach on the weekend of July 19, 1996.

The Revere Beach Reservation Historic District was listed on the National Register of Historic Places in 1998. This was expanded upon when the Revere Beach Reservation was listed in 2003.

==== Rumney Marsh Reservation ====
The Rumney Marsh is a Massachusetts state park occupying 600 acres within Revere and the town of Saugus.

=== Historic Places ===
==== National Register of Historic Places ====
Revere has several places listed on the National Register of Historic Places.

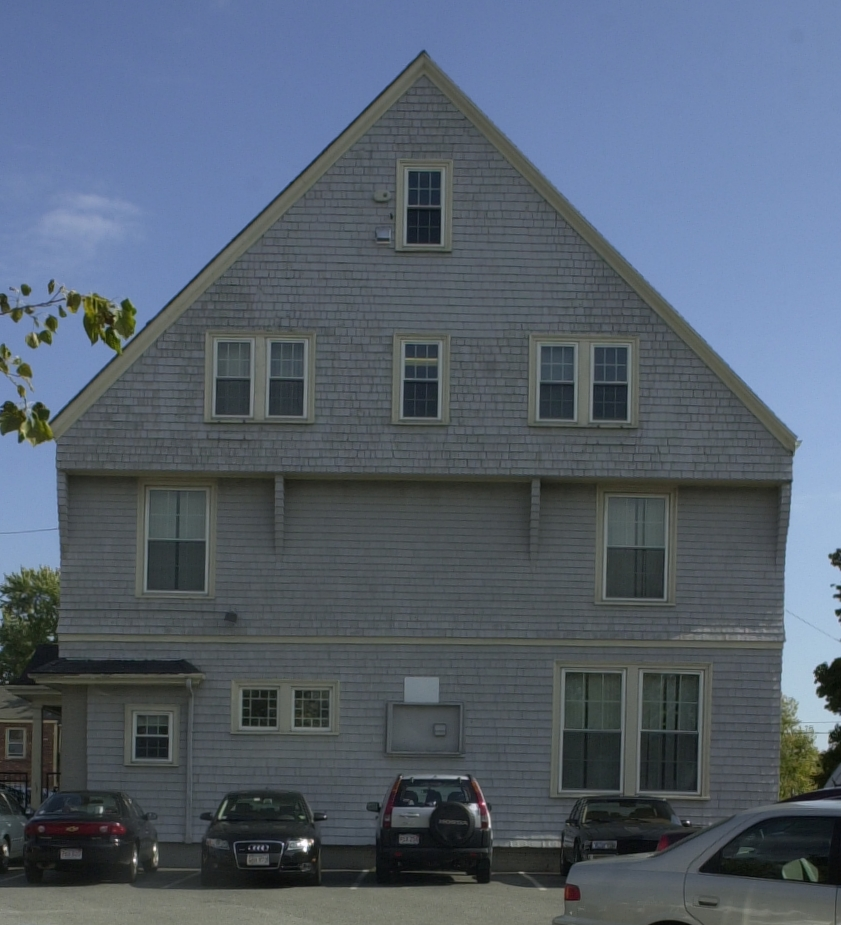
Church of Christ

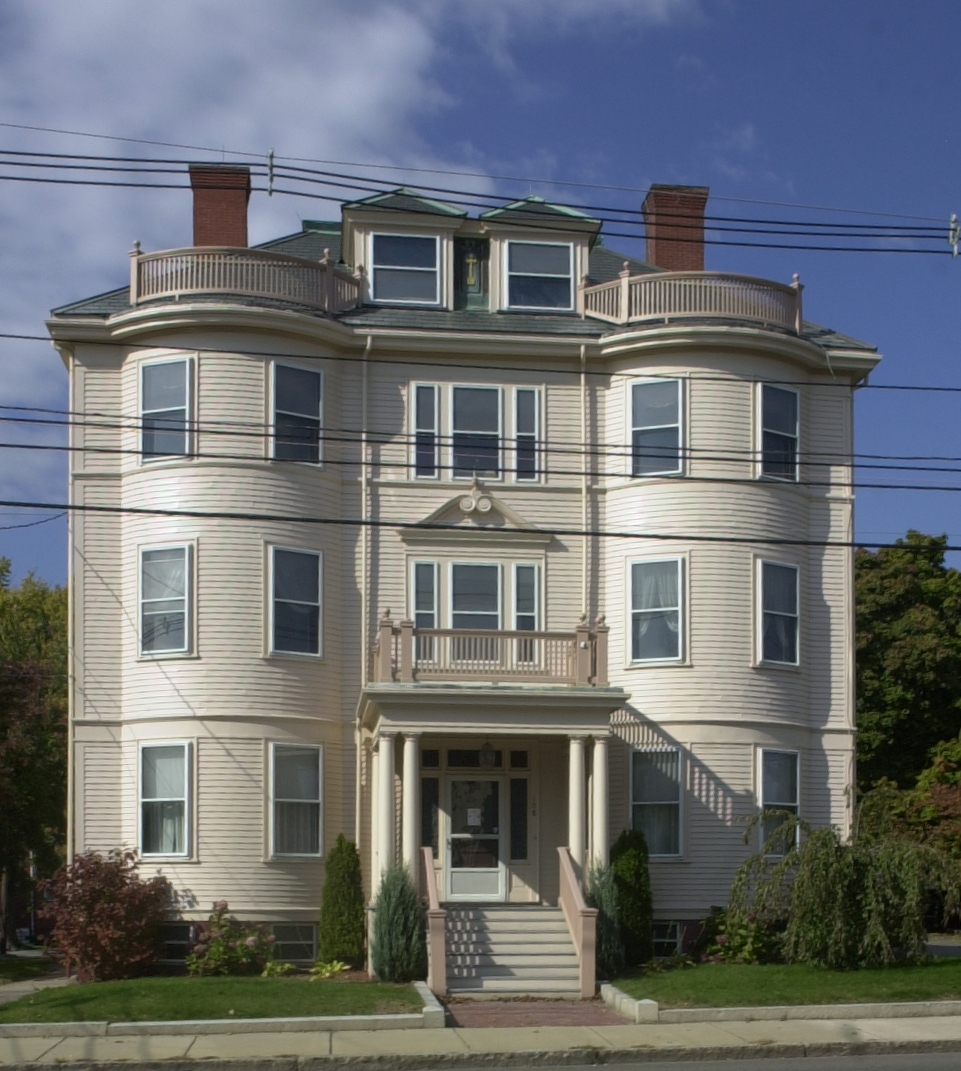
Revere History Museum (Former Immaculate Conception Rectory)

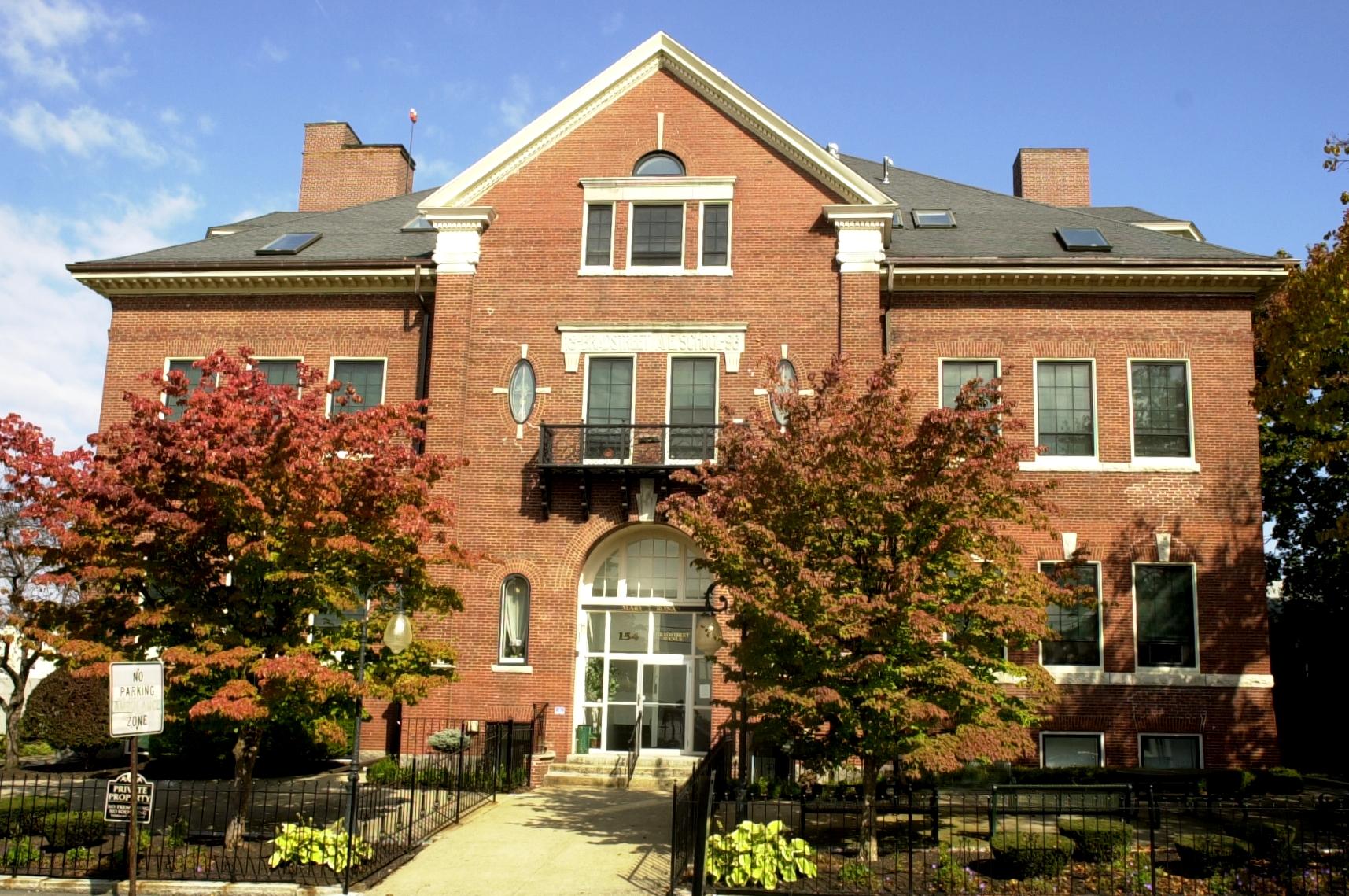
Mary T. Ronan School

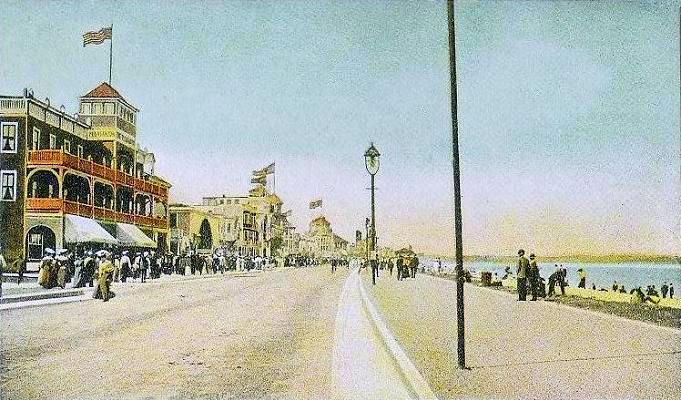
Revere Beach Reservation

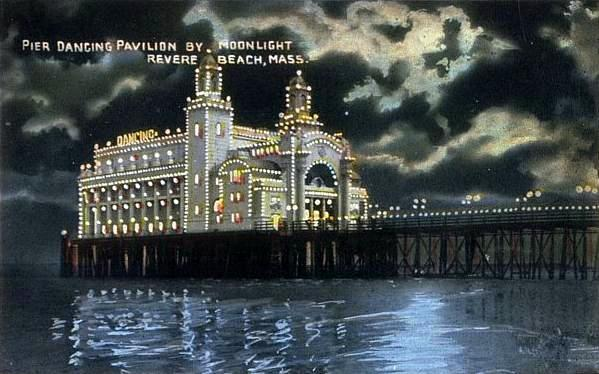
Revere Beach Reservation Historic District

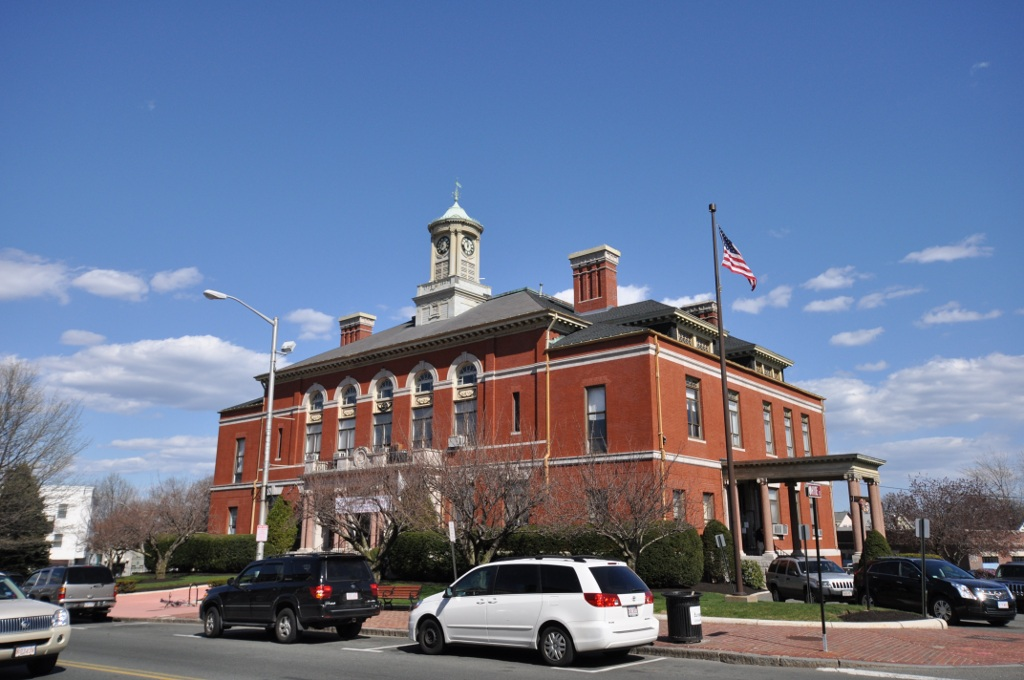
Revere City Hall and Police Station

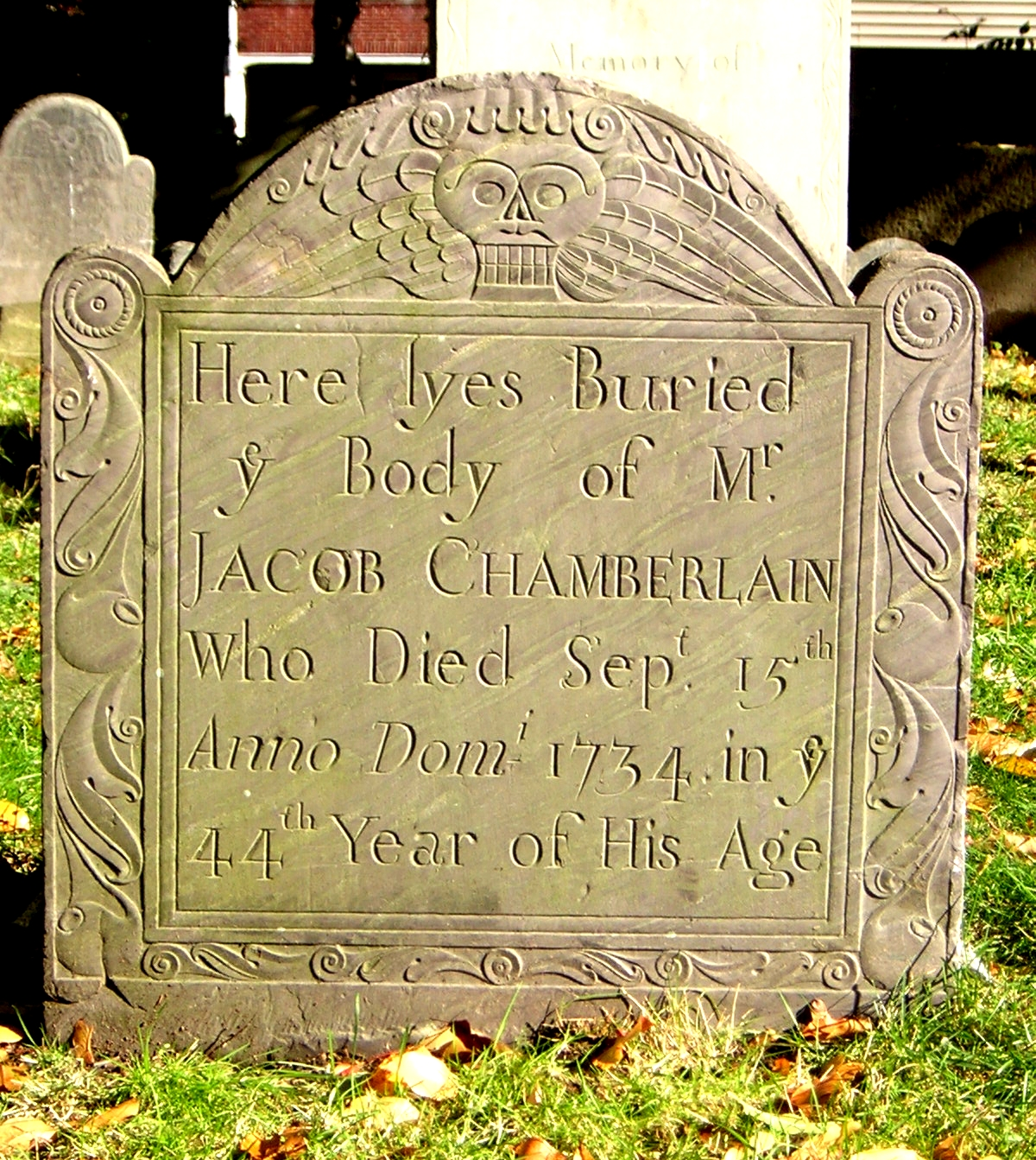
Rumney Marsh Burying Ground

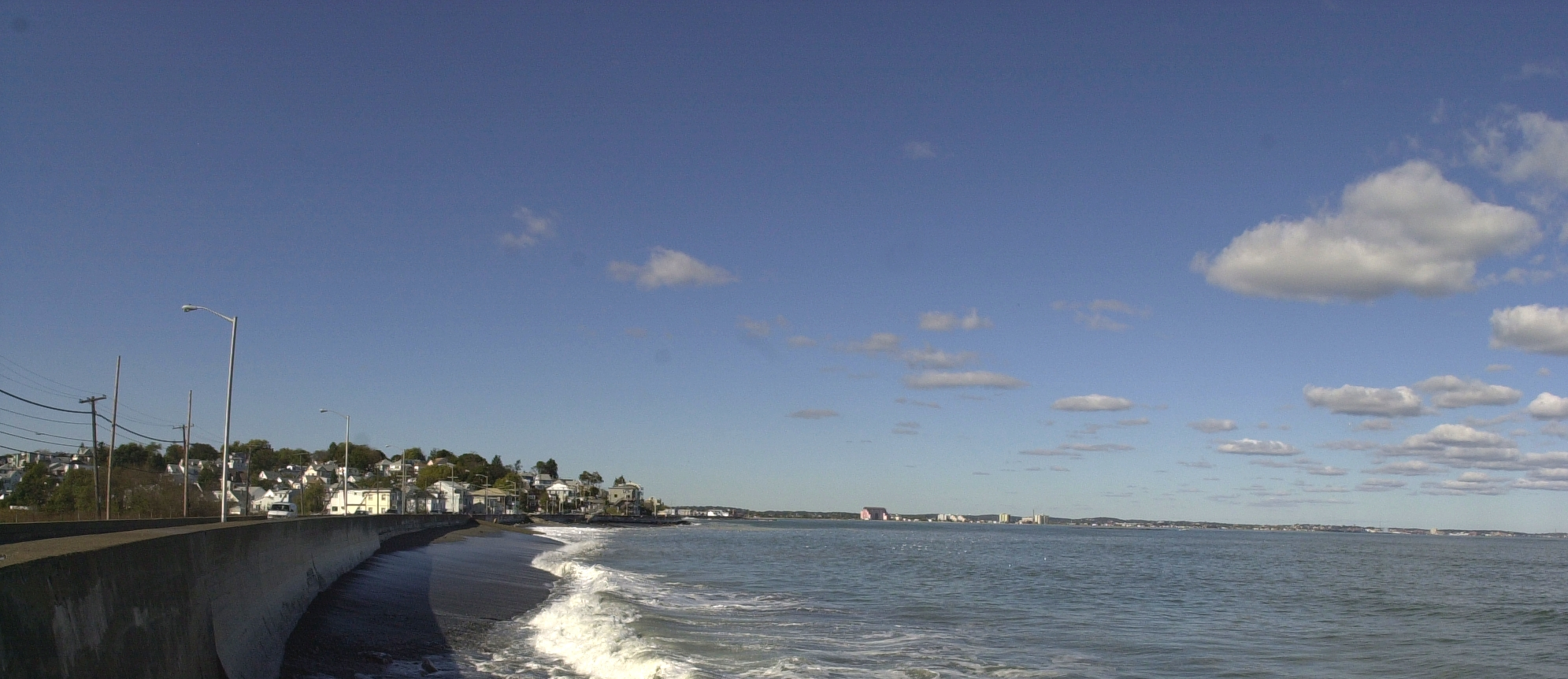
Winthrop Parkway

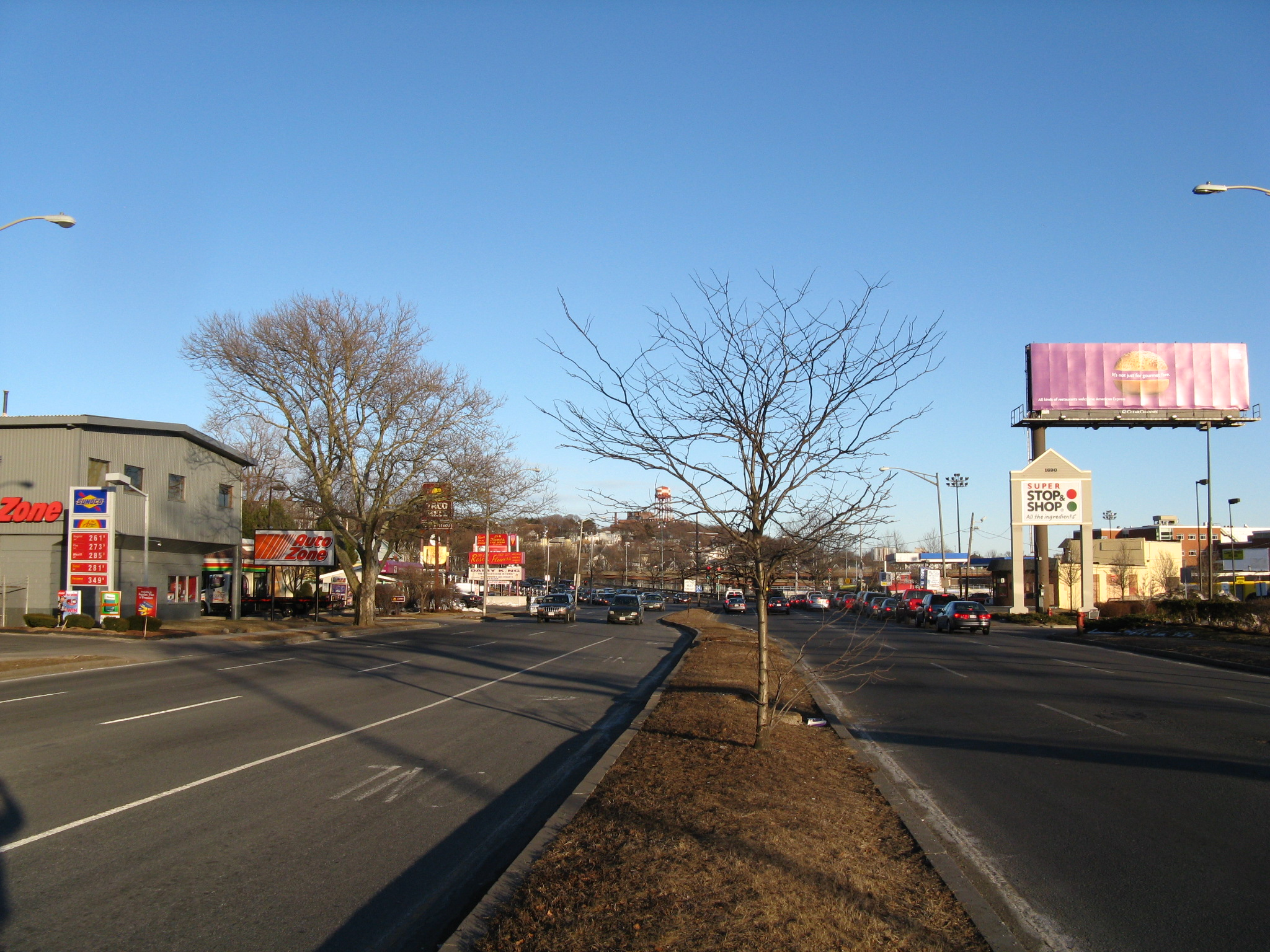
Revere Beach Parkway

==== Other Historic Sites ====
===== Kelly's Roast Beef =====
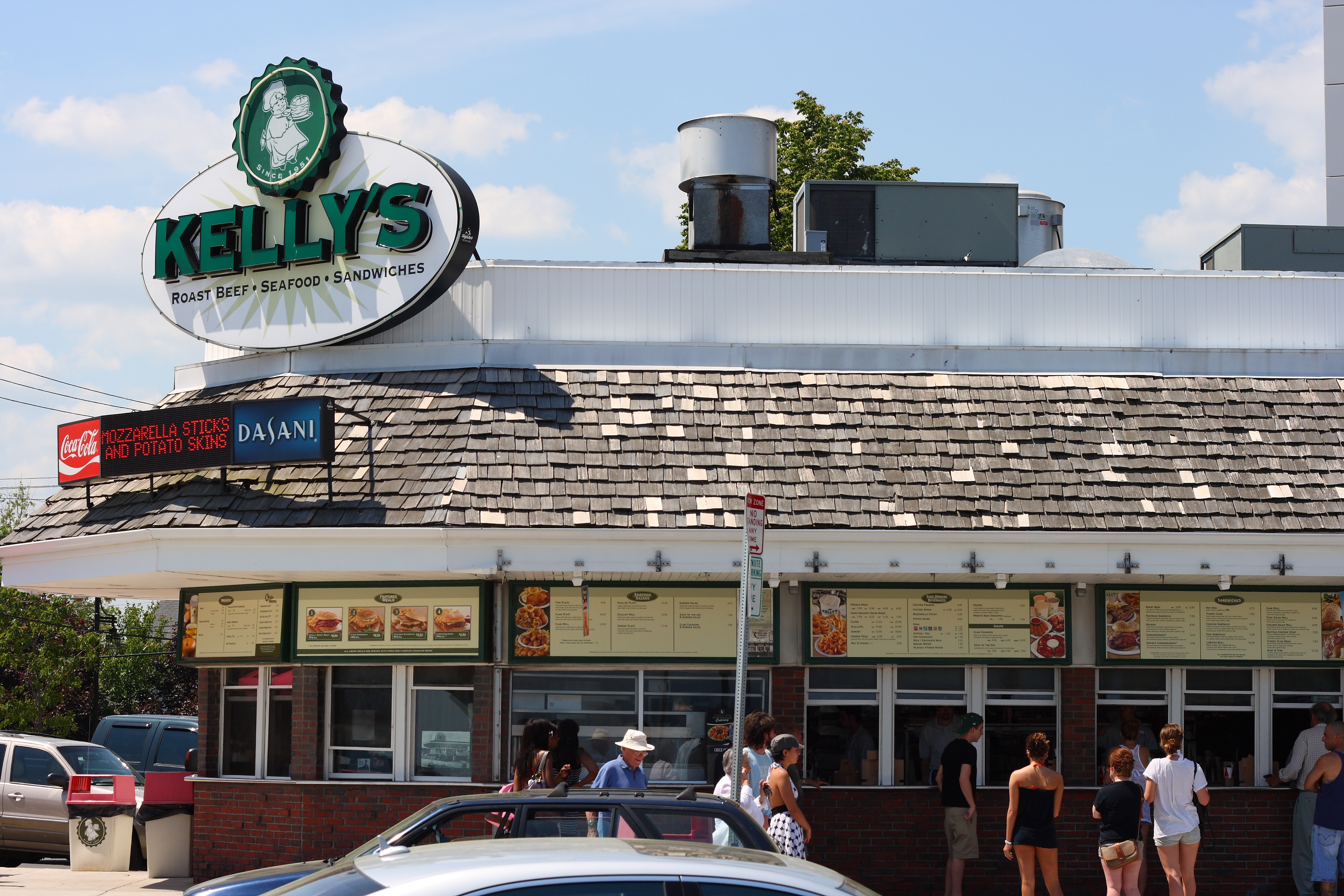
View of the Kelly's Roast Beef location at 410 Revere Beach Boulevard

Kelly's Roast Beef is a fast food eatery founded in Revere in 1951. Its main location is along the Revere Beach shoreline. Kelly's claims to have invented the modern roast beef sandwich, saying it was unknown as such before they introduced it in 1951.

===== Necco Factory =====
Considered the oldest continuously operating candy company in the United States at the time of its 2018 closure, Necco was best known for its namesake candy, Necco Wafers, its seasonal Sweethearts Conversation Hearts, and brands such as the Clark Bar and Haviland Thin Mints. The company maintained headquarters at 135 American Legion Highway in Revere, where it offered tours of the facilities.

===== Revere Post Office =====
From 1934 to 1943 murals were produced in the United States through the Section of Painting and Sculpture, later called the Section of Fine Arts, of the Treasury Department. The intended purpose of the murals was to boost the morale of the American people from the effects of the Depression. Competitions that determined commissioned works were open to all artists in the United States. division. Muralist Ross Moffett painted the mural The First Store and Tavern in 1939 at the U.S. Post Office in Revere.

===== Revere Public Library =====
The Revere Public Library is a Carnegie library established in 1903. It has the distinction of never having undergone an expansion, meaning that the original Georgian Revival and American Renaissance styles of architecture remain visible.

===== Slade Spice Mill =====
Slade Spice Mill is a tide mill that played a small role in the Revolutionary War. Later, it became the origin site of the D & L Slade Spice Company which was, at its peak, the largest spice company in New England.

===== St. Anthony's of Padua =====
St. Anthony's was the city's first national Italian Parish. The church was first built across the street from its current location, the site of today's Friendly Garden, in 1906. The site of a larger church was constructed in 1924, the first mass of the new church was offered in 1926. Its current structure was completed in 1943.

===== Wonderland Greyhound Park =====
Wonderland Greyhound Park was a greyhound racing track located in the city owned by the Westwood Group. It was constructed on the site of the former Wonderland Amusement Park. Wonderland opened on June 12, 1935, and formerly offered 361 performances during its 100-day, April to September racing period. Parimutuel wagering was legalized by the Massachusetts Legislature in 1934. The Park opened the following year and offered greyhound racing from June 1935 until September 2009. It ran its last program on September 18, 2009, as a result of a statewide referendum that banned greyhound racing. The city seized the land by eminent domain in 2022 with the intention of building a new Revere High School on the site; ground was broken on the new school in August 2025.

== Notable people ==
- Chris Alba, harm reduction advocate
- Horatio Alger Jr., author
- Elliot Aronson, psychologist
- Ray Barry, ice hockey player
- Elizabeth Bishop, poet
- Freddy Cannon, musician
- John Cazale, actor
- Robin Christopher, actress
- Katherine Clark, U.S. House Minority Whip, former Massachusetts state senator and state representative
- Billy Conigliaro, professional baseball player
- Tony Conigliaro, professional baseball player
- Glenn Danzig, singer-songwriter
- James DeAngelis, comedian, actor, and YouTuber
- Adio diBiccari, sculptor
- Jim Del Gaizo, professional football player
- Laurence J. Gillis, politician
- Gerald Jordan, businessman
- Bill Macy, actor
- Frank J. Mafera, inventor
- Joseph Malta, soldier
- Gino Martino, professional wrestler
- Roland Merullo, author
- Zack Norman, actor, producer, and financier
- James Porter, Catholic priest and convicted pedophile
- Steve Riley, drummer with hard rock bands Keel, W.A.S.P., L.A. Guns, and Riley's L.A. Guns.
- James Sokolove, attorney
- Beverly Swerling, novelist
- Mike Vincenti, judoka
- Henry Waitt, cigar manufacturer

== In popular culture ==
- Next Stop Wonderland is a 1998 film referencing Revere's MBTA station, Wonderland, in its title.
- The X-Files makes reference to Revere in the episode "Paper Hearts."
- Stephen King makes reference to Revere Beach in his 2011 novel, Misery.
- The 2015 film based on the book Black Mass, starring Johnny Depp, was filmed on location at Revere Beach. The beach was staged to take on the appearance of Miami Beach.
- The 2021 film Free Guy, starring Ryan Reynolds was filmed on Revere Beach.

== Sister city ==
Former mayor Brian Arrigo signed a sister city agreement on Tuesday, August 2, 2016, with former mayor Shoji Nishida of Date, Fukushima.
