= National Register of Historic Places listings in Suffolk County, Massachusetts =

Location of Suffolk County in Massachusetts

This is a list of the National Register of Historic Places listings in Suffolk County, Massachusetts.

This is intended to be a complete list of the properties and districts on the National Register of Historic Places in Suffolk County, Massachusetts, United States. Latitude and longitude coordinates are provided for many National Register properties and districts; these locations may be seen together in a map.

There are 355 properties and districts listed on the National Register in the county, including 58 National Historic Landmarks. The city of Boston is the location of more than 300 of these properties and districts, including 57 National Historic Landmarks; they are listed separately. Properties and districts located in the county's other three municipalities are listed here.

Contents: Counties in Massachusetts

Barnstable | Berkshire | Bristol | Dukes | Essex | Franklin | Hampden | Hampshire | Middlesex | Nantucket | Norfolk | Plymouth | Suffolk | Worcester

This National Park Service list is complete through NPS recent listings posted October 30, 2026.

== Current listings ==
For reasons of length, the Boston list has been split into northern and southern listings, divided by the Massachusetts Turnpike. Northern Boston has 149 of these listings, including 39 districts, 48 landmarks, and three National Historic Landmark Districts. Southern Boston, including locations in Boston Harbor, has 186 listings, including 46 districts, 12 landmarks, and one National Historic Landmark District. Two historic districts overlap into both northern and southern Boston: milestones that make up the 1767 Milestones are found in both areas, and the Olmsted Park System extends through much of the city.

=== Boston ===
Area	Image	First Date listed	Last Date listed	Count
Northern		October 15, 1966	December 26, 2023	149
Southern		October 15, 1966	October 28, 2024	186

=== Other municipalities ===
	Name on the Register	Image	Date listed	Location	City or town	Description
1	Bellingham Square Historic District	Bellingham Square Historic District	January 3, 1985 (#85000030)	Roughly bounded by Broadway, Shawmut, Chestnut, and Shurtleff Sts. 42°23′37″N 71°02′02″W	Chelsea	
2	Bellingham-Cary House	Bellingham-Cary House	September 6, 1974 (#74000908)	34 Parker St. 42°23′54″N 71°01′41″W	Chelsea	
3	Chelsea Garden Cemetery	Chelsea Garden Cemetery	February 9, 2001 (#01000089)	70 Central Ave. 42°23′25″N 71°02′00″W	Chelsea	
4	Chelsea Square Historic District		April 8, 1982 (#09000144)	Roughly bounded by Broadway, Medford, Tremont, Winnisimmet, Cross, Park and Beacon Sts. 42°23′23″N 71°02′18″W	Chelsea	
5	Church of Christ	Church of Christ	November 13, 1984 (#84000430)	265 Beach St. 42°24′33″N 71°00′26″W	Revere	
6	Congregation Agudath Shalom	Congregation Agudath Shalom	April 16, 1993 (#93000283)	145 Walnut St. 42°23′34″N 71°02′17″W	Chelsea	
7	Downtown Chelsea Residential Historic District	Downtown Chelsea Residential Historic District	June 22, 1988 (#88000718)	Roughly bounded by Shurtleff, Marginal, and Division Sts. and Bellingham Sq. 42°23′21″N 71°02′15″W	Chelsea	
8	Fort Banks Mortar Battery	Fort Banks Mortar Battery	March 12, 2007 (#07000144)	Kennedy Dr. 42°23′04″N 70°58′49″W	Winthrop	
9	Highland School	Highland School	March 18, 2014 (#14000063)	36 Grovers Ave. 42°23′06″N 70°58′23″W	Winthrop	
10	Immaculate Conception Rectory	Immaculate Conception Rectory	February 11, 2002 (#01001559)	108 Beach St. 42°24′25″N 71°00′42″W	Revere	
11	C. Henry Kimball House	C. Henry Kimball House	April 15, 1982 (#82004464)	295 Washington Ave. 42°23′58″N 71°02′06″W	Chelsea	
12	Luna (tugboat)	Luna (tugboat)	October 6, 1983 (#83004099)	Chelsea, Massachusetts; 42°23′11″N 71°02′30″W	Chelsea	The first diesel-electric ship docking tugboat and now the last full size wood tugboat.
13	Naval Hospital Boston Historic District	Naval Hospital Boston Historic District	August 14, 1973 (#73000851)	1 Broadway; 42°23′13″N 71°02′44″W	Chelsea	
14	Edward B. Newton School	Edward B. Newton School	August 18, 1997 (#97000878)	131 Pauline St. 42°22′33″N 70°59′13″W	Winthrop	
15	Revere Beach Parkway-Metropolitan Park System of Greater Boston	Revere Beach Parkway-Metropolitan Park System of Greater Boston	December 6, 2007 (#07001241)	Revere Beach Pkwy; 42°24′16″N 71°01′49″W	Chelsea	Extends into Medford, Everett and Revere
16	Revere Beach Reservation	Revere Beach Reservation	May 27, 2003 (#03000642)	Revere Beach Boulevard, Eliot Circle to Northern Circle; 42°25′15″N 70°59′08″W	Revere	
17	Revere Beach Reservation Historic District	Revere Beach Reservation Historic District	July 15, 1998 (#98000871)	Roughly bounded by Eliot Circle, Revere Beach Boulevard, Northern Circle, and the Atlantic Ocean; 42°25′15″N 70°59′08″W	Revere	
18	Revere City Hall and Police Station	Revere City Hall and Police Station	March 7, 2012 (#12000070)	281 Broadway & 23 Pleasant St. 42°24′28″N 71°00′47″W	Revere	
19	Mary T. Ronan School	Mary T. Ronan School	December 10, 1982 (#82000485)	154 Bradstreet Ave. 42°23′46″N 70°59′14″W	Revere	
20	Rumney Marsh Burying Ground	Rumney Marsh Burying Ground	February 11, 2004 (#04000025)	Butler St. at Elm and Bixby Sts. 42°24′27″N 71°00′23″W	Revere	
21	Slade Spice Mill	Slade Spice Mill	June 30, 1972 (#09000709)	770 Revere Beach Parkway; 42°24′11″N 71°00′46″W	Revere	
22	Winthrop Center/Metcalf Square Historic District	Winthrop Center/Metcalf Square Historic District	March 23, 2010 (#10000098)	Roughly bounded by Lincoln, Winthrop Sts., Winthrop Cemetery, Buchanan, Fremont, Pauline, Hermon and Belcher Sts. 42°22′37″N 70°59′04″W	Winthrop	
23	Deane Winthrop House	Deane Winthrop House	March 9, 1990 (#90000162)	34 Shirley St. 42°22′57″N 70°58′41″W	Winthrop	
24	Winthrop Parkway, Metropolitan Parkway System of Greater Boston	Winthrop Parkway, Metropolitan Parkway System of Greater Boston	January 21, 2004 (#03001471)	Winthrop Parkway; 42°23′29″N 70°58′55″W	Revere	
25	Winthrop Shore Dr., Metropolitan Park System of Greater Boston	Winthrop Shore Dr., Metropolitan Park System of Greater Boston	January 21, 2004 (#03001469)	Winthrop Shore Dr. 42°22′11″N 70°58′05″W	Winthrop	
