= Immaculate Conception Rectory =

Immaculate Conception Rectory may refer to:

- Rectory and Church of the Immaculate Conception, Norfolk, Connecticut, NRHP-listed
- Immaculate Conception Rectory (Revere, Massachusetts), NRHP-listed
- Immaculate Conception Church and Rectory, St. Louis, Missouri, listed on the NRHP in St. Louis, Missouri
- Immaculate Conception Church and School, Omaha, Nebraska, NRHP-listed
- Immaculate Conception Catholic Church and Rectory, St. Helena, Nebraska, listed on the NRHP in Cedar County, Nebraska
- Immaculate Conception Rectory at Botkins, Botkins, Ohio, NRHP-listed, in Shelby County, Ohio
- Immaculate Conception Church, School, and Rectory, Cincinnati, Ohio, NRHP-listed
