= Edward B. Newton School =

- U.S. National Register of Historic Places
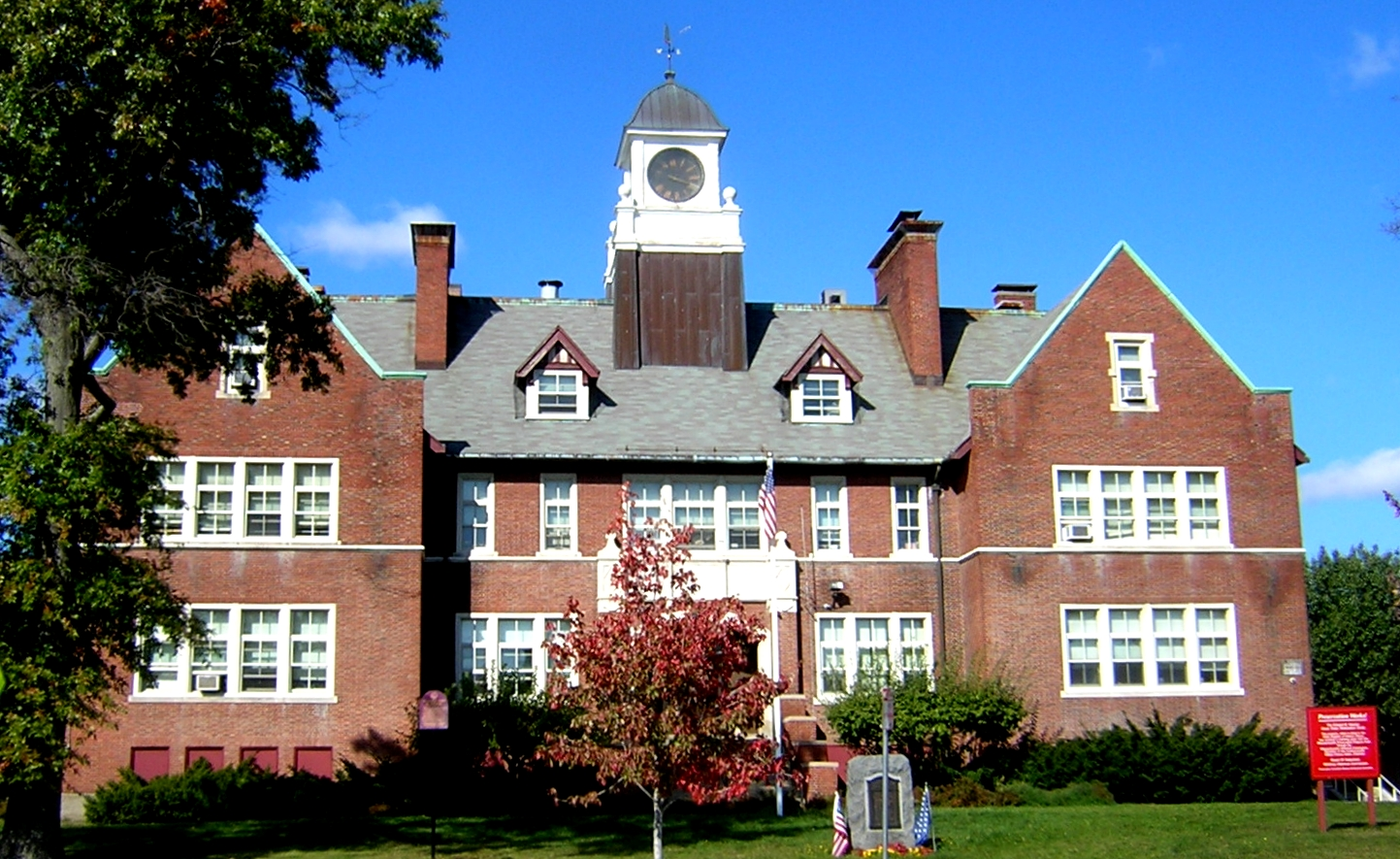

- Location within Massachusetts Location within the United States
- Location: 131 Pauline St., Winthrop, Massachusetts
- Coordinates: 42°22′36″N 70°59′11″W
- Area: 4.5 acres (1.8 ha)
- Architect: Bacon, Willard M.
- Architectural style: Tudor Revival, Colonial Revival
- NRHP reference No.: 97000878
- Added to NRHP: August 18, 1997

The Edward B. Newton School is a historic school building at 131 Pauline Street in Winthrop, Massachusetts. It is a large H-shaped 2 1/2-story brick Tudor Revival building, set on the north side of Pauline Street in central Winthrop. It was designed by William M. Bacon and built in 1908. It was named after Edward B. Newton, a longtime Winthrop resident who was a member of the school committee for 17 years, who donated funds for the clock.

The building was listed on the National Register of Historic Places in 1997. Today it is the Winthrop Public Schools Administration Center.

== Gallery ==
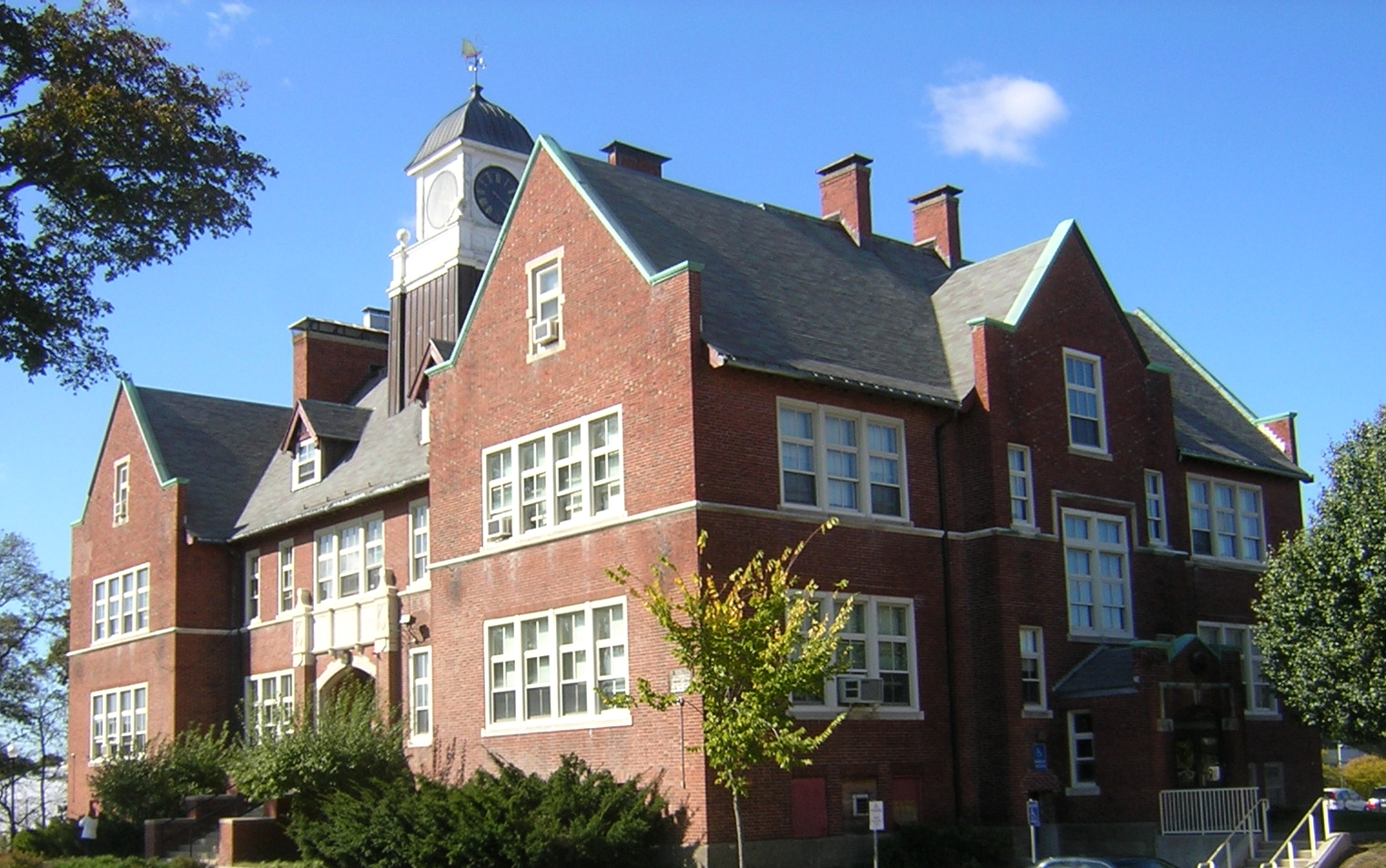

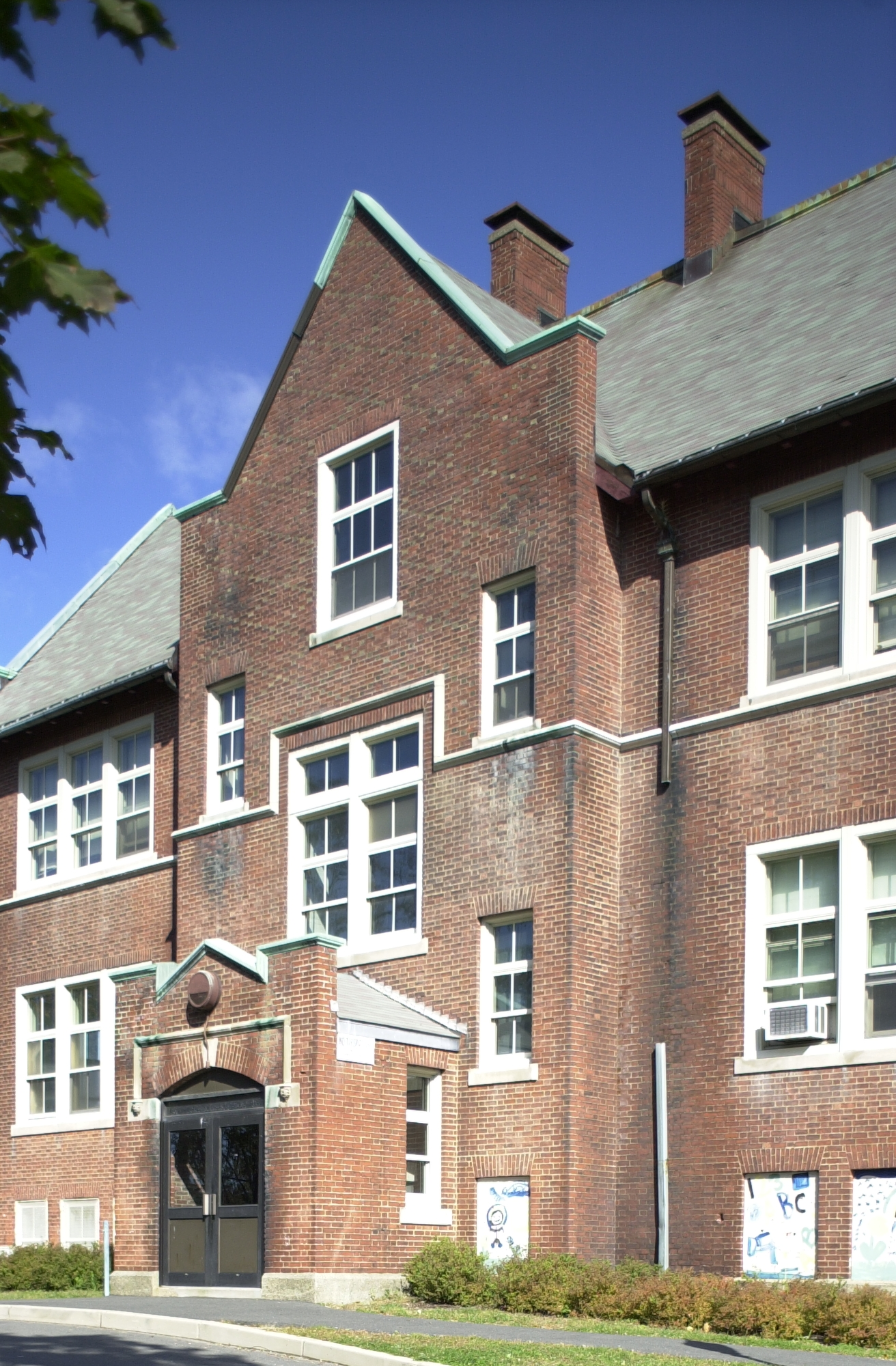

== See also ==
- National Register of Historic Places listings in Suffolk County, Massachusetts
