= C. Henry Kimball House =

Historic house in Massachusetts, United States

- U.S. National Register of Historic Places
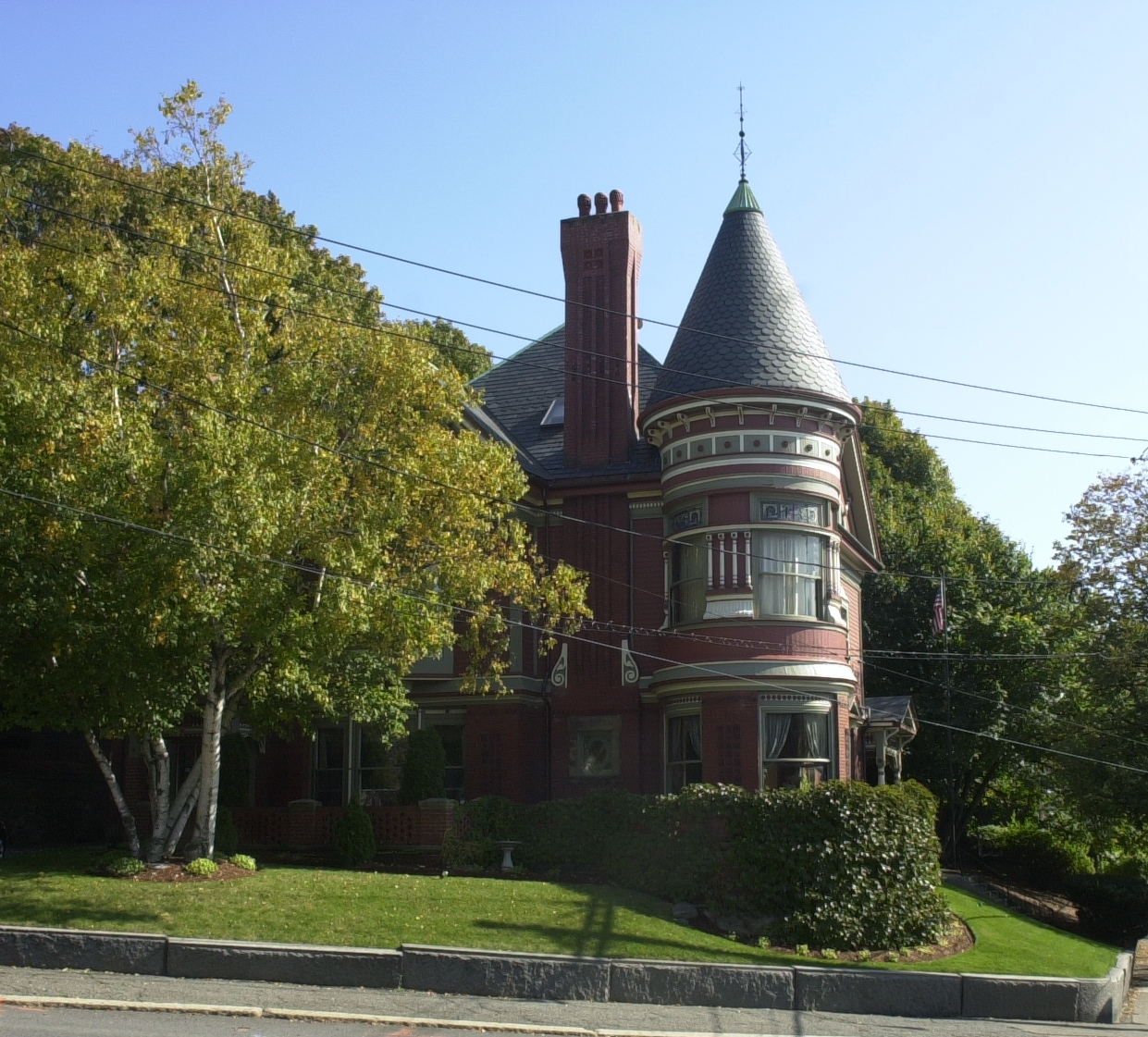

- Location within Massachusetts
- Location: 295 Washington Ave., Chelsea, Massachusetts
- Coordinates: 42°24′07.5″N 71°2′6″W
- Area: 0.3 acres (0.12 ha)
- Built: 1880
- Architect: Kimball, C. Henry
- Architectural style: Queen Anne
- NRHP reference No.: 82004464
- Added to NRHP: April 15, 1982

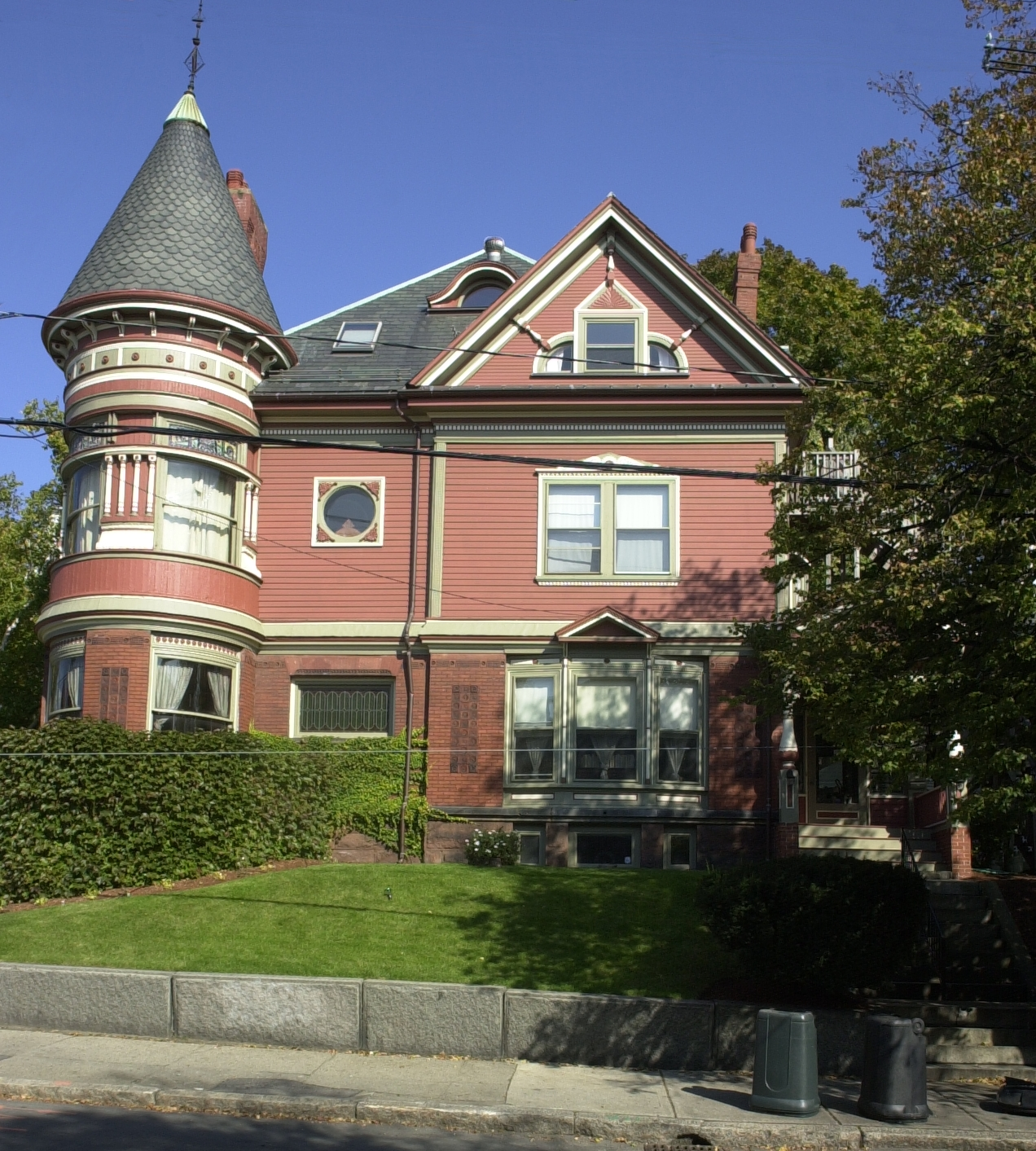

The C. Henry Kimball House is an historic house at 295 Washington Avenue in Chelsea, Massachusetts. The 2 1/2-story wood-frame house was built c. 1896, and is one of the city's finest Queen Anne Victorian houses. It was built by Charles Henry Kimball, an innovative businessman who developed heated vehicles, revolutionizing the transport of potatoes. He was also a major figure in the development of Chelsea's wholesale fruit and produce exchange.

The house was listed on the National Register of Historic Places in 1982.

== See also ==
- National Register of Historic Places listings in Suffolk County, Massachusetts
