= Highland School (Winthrop, Massachusetts) =

- U.S. National Register of Historic Places
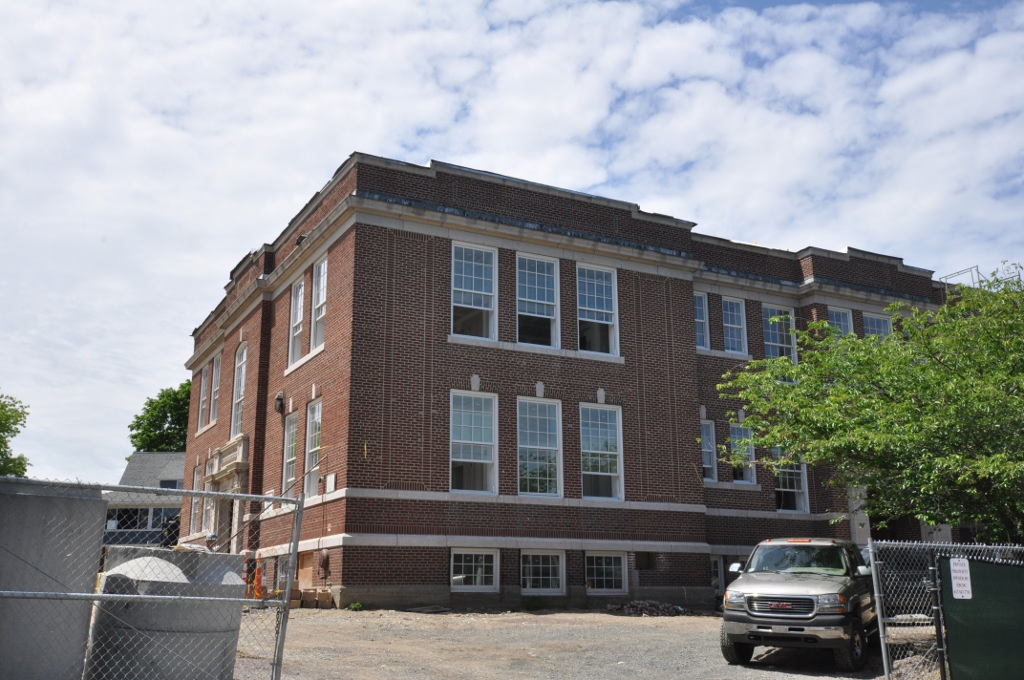

- Location within Massachusetts Location within the United States
- Location: 36 Grovers Ave., Winthrop, Massachusetts
- Coordinates: 42°23′6″N 70°58′23″W
- Built: 1921
- Architectural style: Georgian Revival
- NRHP reference No.: 14000063
- Added to NRHP: March 18, 2014

The Highland School, also the Arthur W. Dalrymple School, is a historic school building at 36 Grovers Avenue in Winthrop, Massachusetts. The Georgian Revival two story brick building was built in 1920–21 to replace a nearby school that burned down in 1920. It was built on the site of the Leighton Resort, a popular summer destination. The school's later dedicatee was a local resident who taught at the school and later became Winthrop's superintendent of schools.

The building was added to the National Register of Historic Places in 2014.

== See also ==
- National Register of Historic Places listings in Suffolk County, Massachusetts
