= Church of Christ (Revere, Massachusetts) =

Historic church in Massachusetts, United States

- U.S. National Register of Historic Places
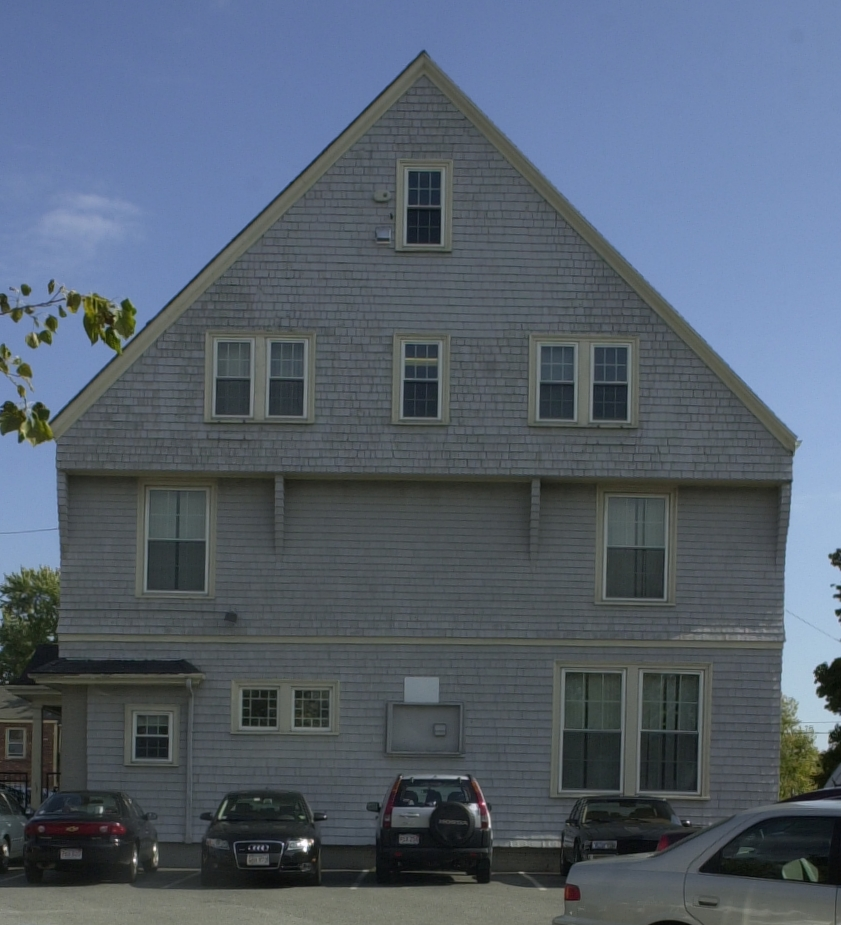

- Location within Massachusetts Location within the United States
- Location: 265 Beach St., Revere, Massachusetts
- Coordinates: 42°24′32″N 71°0′25″W
- Area: 0.4 acres (0.16 ha)
- Built: 1888
- Architectural style: Shingle Style
- NRHP reference No.: 84000430
- Added to NRHP: November 13, 1984

The Church of Christ, later the Revere Masonic Temple, is a historic church building at 265 Beach Street in Revere, Massachusetts, United States. Now a three-story Shingle style structure, it encapsulates elements of a 1710 colonial meeting house, one of the oldest such structures to survive. The building was listed on the National Register of Historic Places in 1984. The building now houses professional offices.

== Description and history ==
The former Church of Christ building is located east of downtown Revere, on a roughly triangular parcel of land bounded by Beach and Eustis Streets, and Cary Avenue. It is 3 1/2 stories in height, with two full stories below the gabled roof, and 1-1/2 within the roof gables. The gable ends overhang the sides, with curved shingled brackets for support. The central portion of the roof has been partially raised by long shed dormers. The main sections of the long sides have three round-arch windows on the third level, set above smaller sash windows on the second, with a less regular arrangement of doors and windows on the ground floor.

The building achieved its present appearance c. 1888, when it was enlarged and given its Stick and Shingle styling. Its significance lies in its origins, which are as a colonial meetinghouse erected in 1710, whose oaken timber frame, still part of this building, is one of the oldest such surviving structures. The meetinghouse, which measured 43' by 35', was a two-story structure, to which a bell tower with a steeple was added later in the 18th century. The spire was removed in 1823 and replaced with a domed cupola. In 1856 the building was rotated ninety degrees, and given Italianate styling. The 1888 alterations added the third floor and increased its size. It was purchased by a Masonic lodge society in 1919, at which time the tower was removed. It was in active use by Masonic organizations until 1982.

== Gallery ==
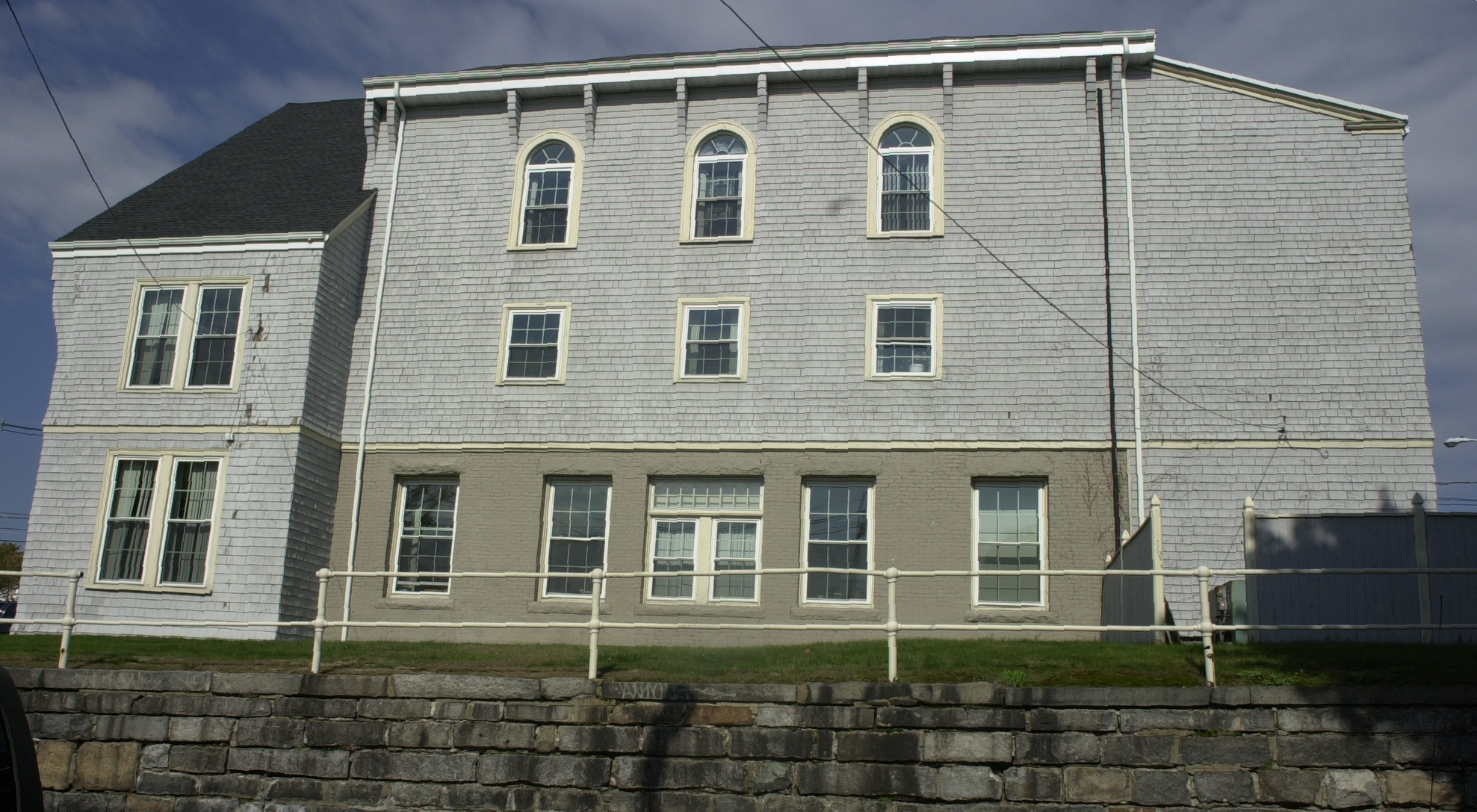

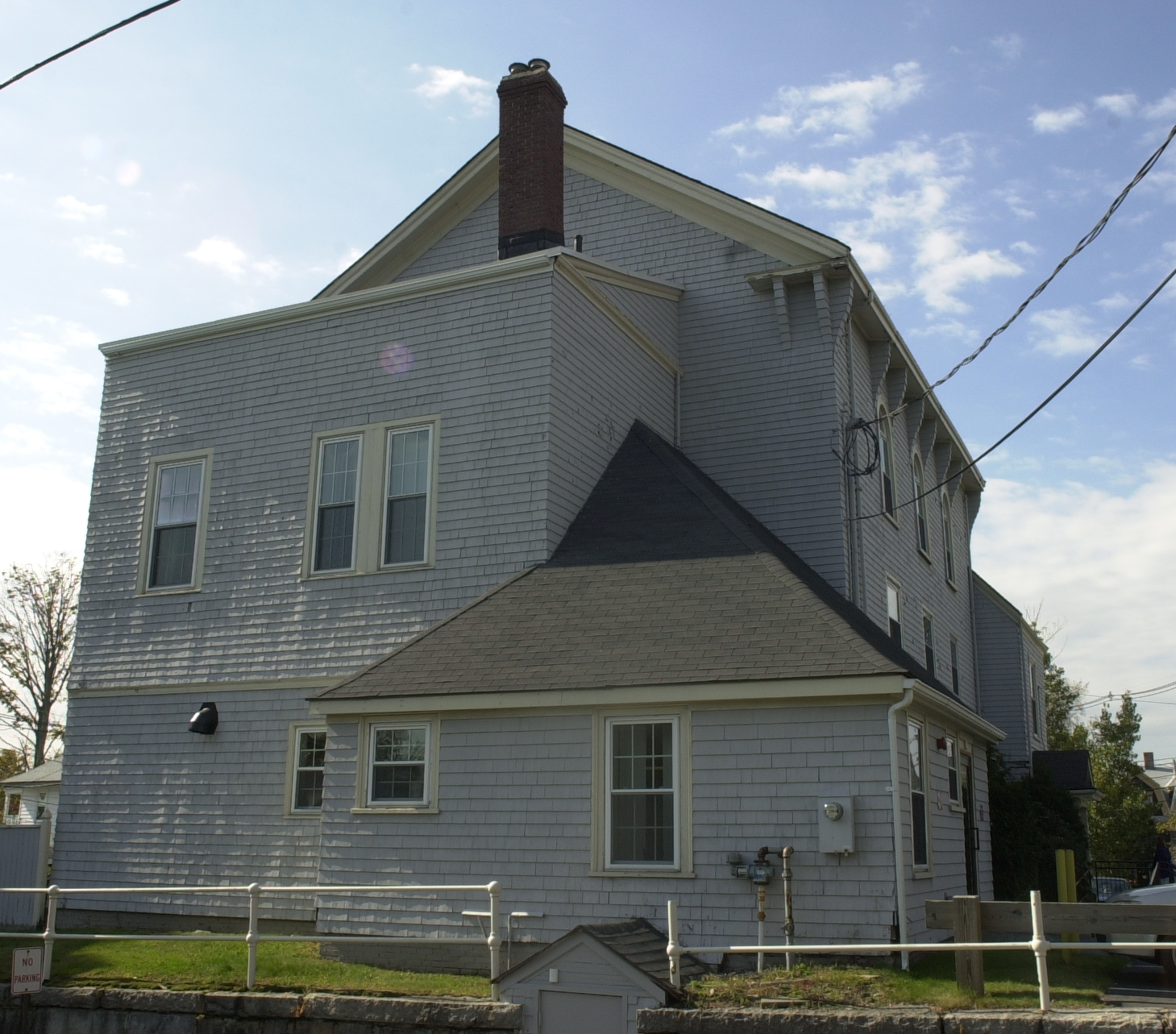

== See also ==
- National Register of Historic Places listings in Suffolk County, Massachusetts
