= Chelsea Garden Cemetery =

Historic cemetery in Massachusetts, United States

- U.S. National Register of Historic Places
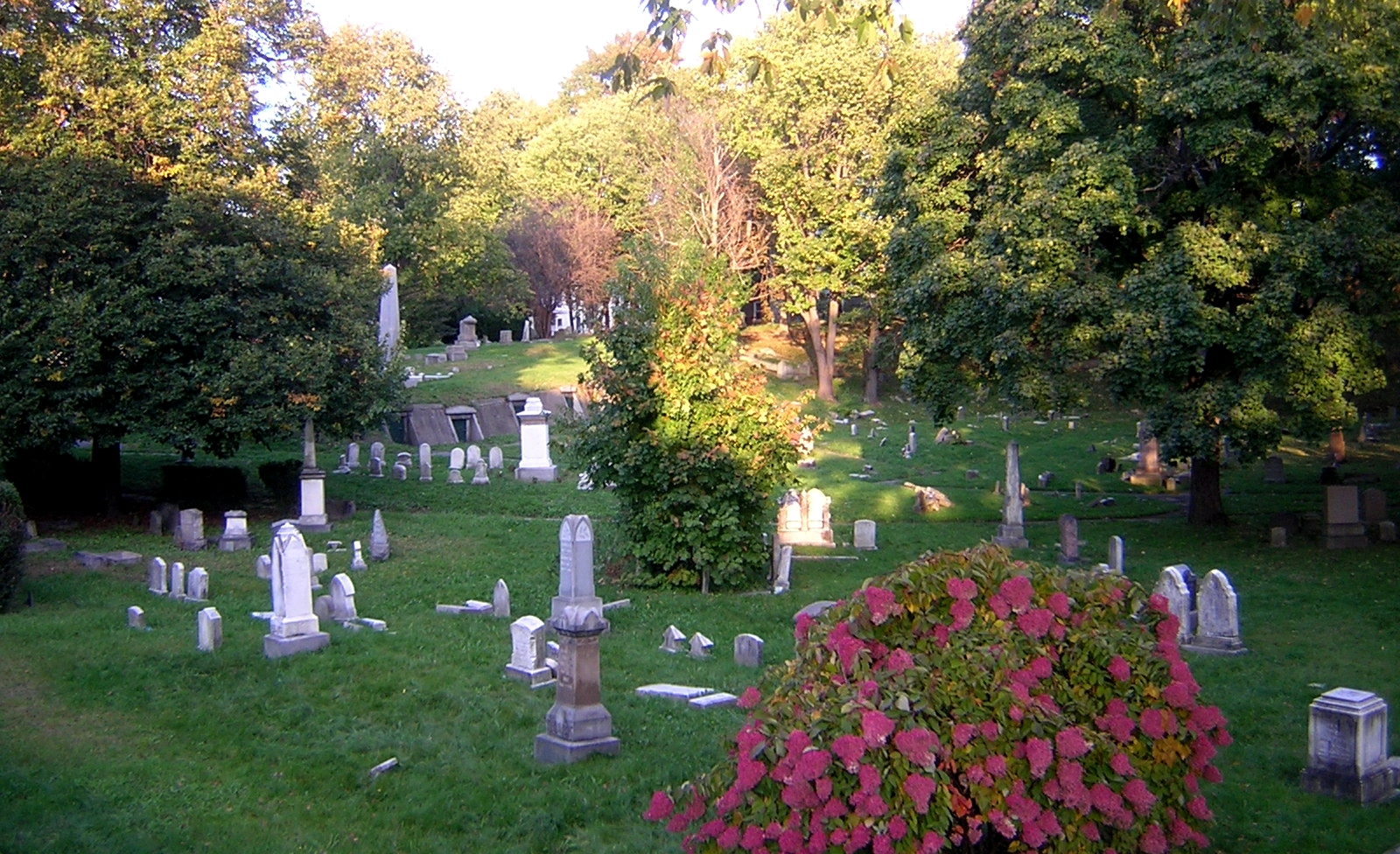

- Location within Massachusetts Location within the United States
- Location: 70 Central Ave., Chelsea, Massachusetts
- Coordinates: 42°23′25″N 71°1′59″W
- Area: 3.2 acres (1.3 ha)
- NRHP reference No.: 01000089
- Added to NRHP: February 9, 2001

Chelsea Garden Cemetery is a historic rural cemetery in Chelsea, Massachusetts. The cemetery was established in 1841 to provide the city a burying ground in the then-fashionable rural cemetery style, and was the first cemetery within the city limits. It was added to the National Register of Historic Places in 2001.

== Description and history ==
Chelsea Garden Cemetery is located south east of the city's Bellingham Square civic center, and consists of a rectangular parcel about 3.2 acres (1.3 ha) in size. It has a network of paths which wind over the undulating terrain, rising from a low point in the southeast. One of its focal points was originally a man-made pond, located at the lowest point in the cemetery; it was filled in late in the 19th century. Another is the Soldiers Circle at main entrance, where a number of the city's Civil War dead are buried. The cemetery is estimated to hold more than 1,600 burials; due to the transient nature of the Chelsea population over the period of the cemetery's existence, with little historical continuity, it has had a history neglect and vandalism. The fringes of the cemetery were also damaged by the 1908 fire that devastated the city, and destroyed some cemetery records.

Prior to construction of this cemetery, Chelsea's dead were buried in a colonial-era cemetery in nearby Revere. With heightened awareness of sanitation and hygiene, local citizens formed a cemetery association in 1841 for a private, non-sectarian burial ground. The first burial took place on December 7, 1841, and was a reburial of a Chelsea man who died in 1832 and had been buried in Boston. The cemetery was the city's only burying ground until 1851 when Woodlawn Cemetery was founded on land that is now part of Everett. The cemetery originally had a wooden fence around part of its perimeter, and a wooden gatehouse; these were casualties of the 1908 fire.

== Notable people ==
- Pauline Hopkins
- Charles Stromberg, founder of Stromberg Guitars

== Gallery ==
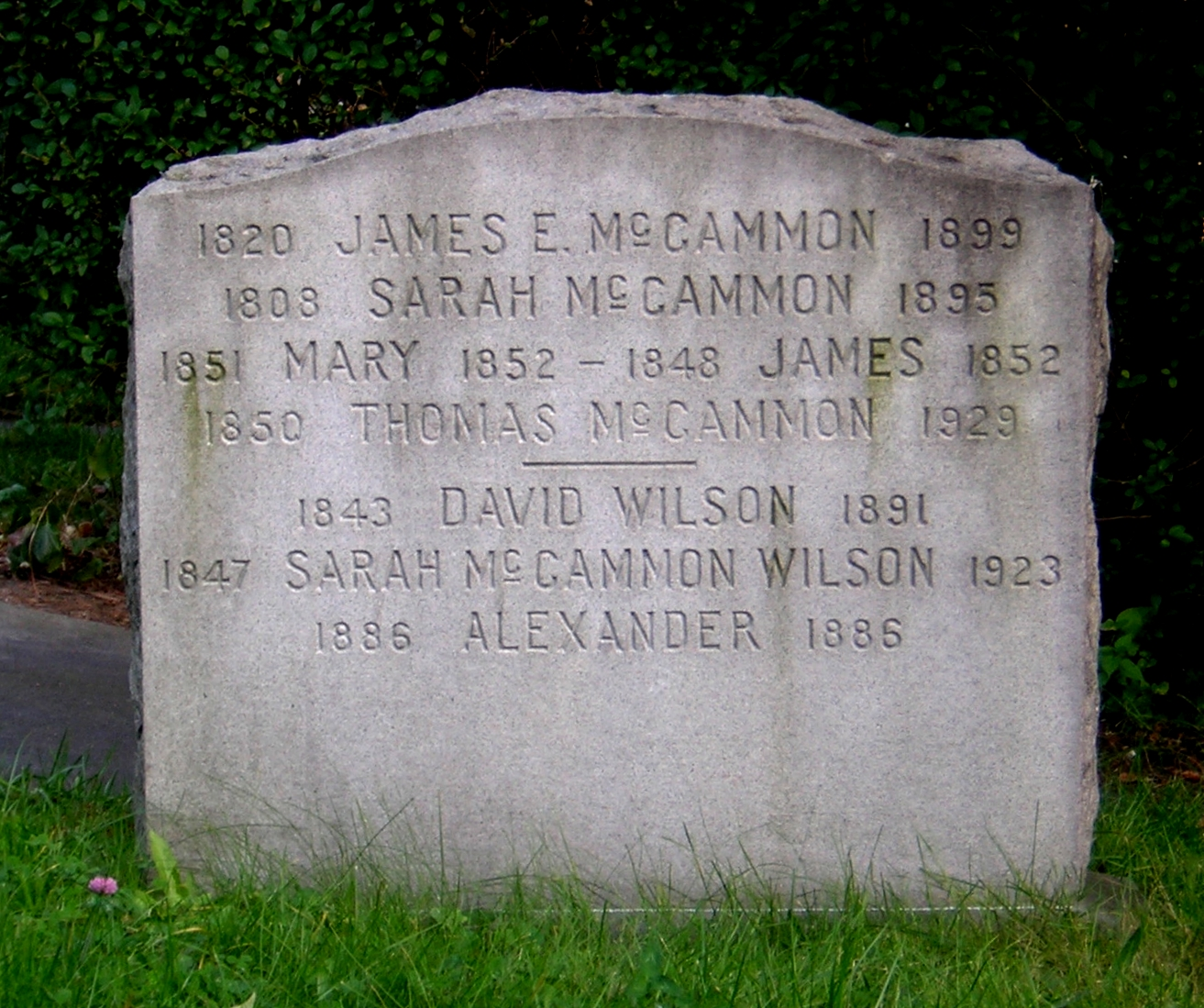

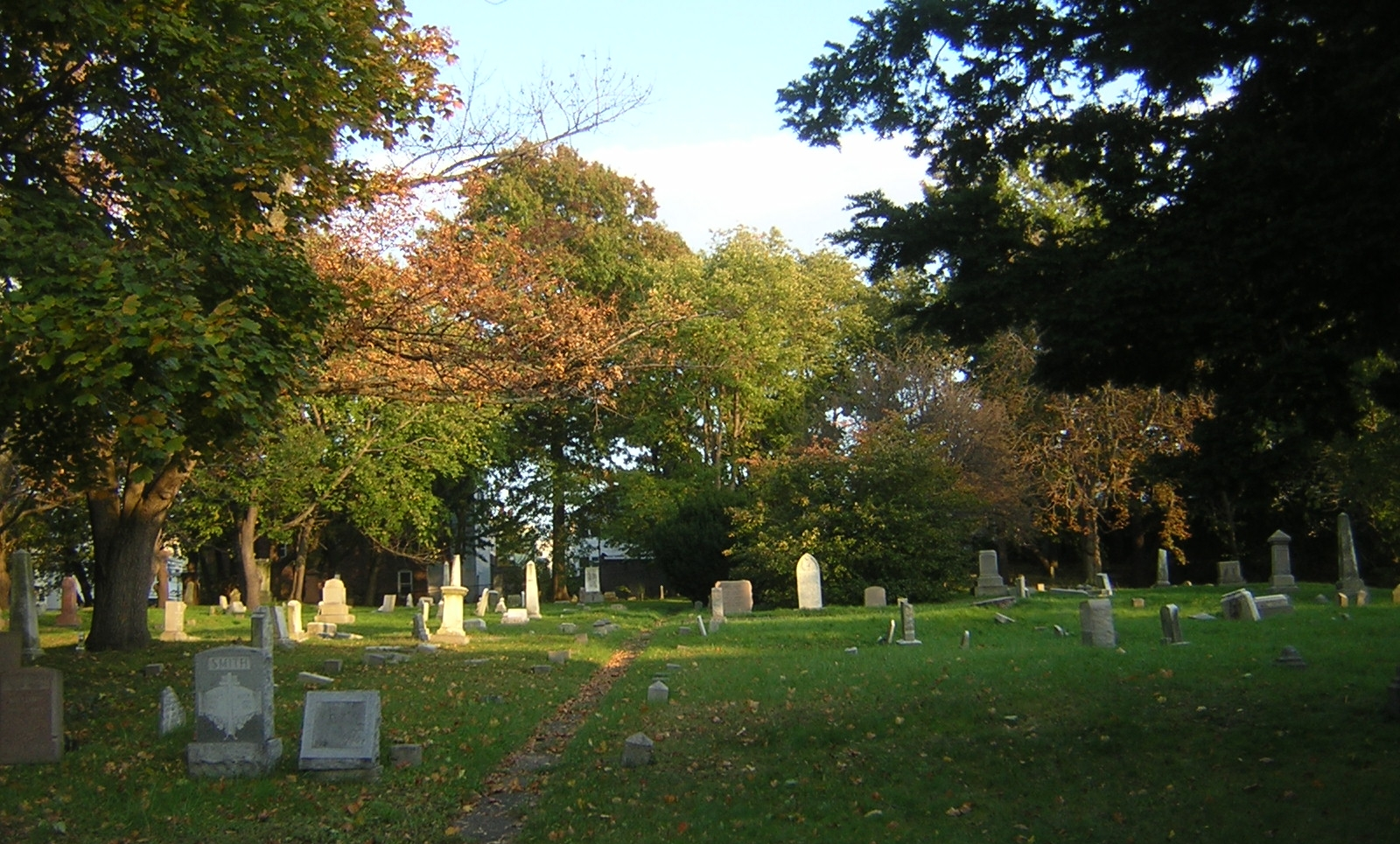

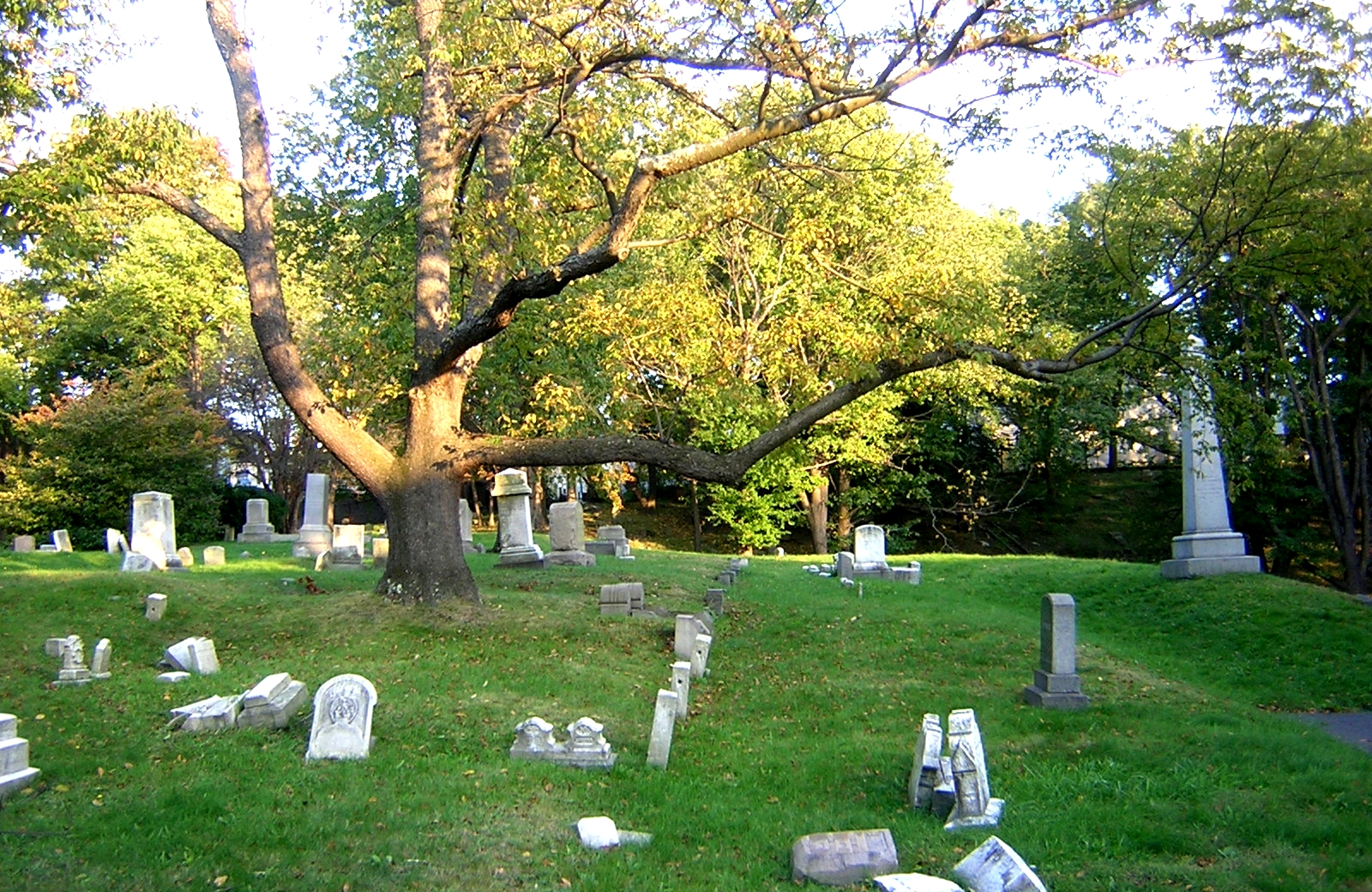

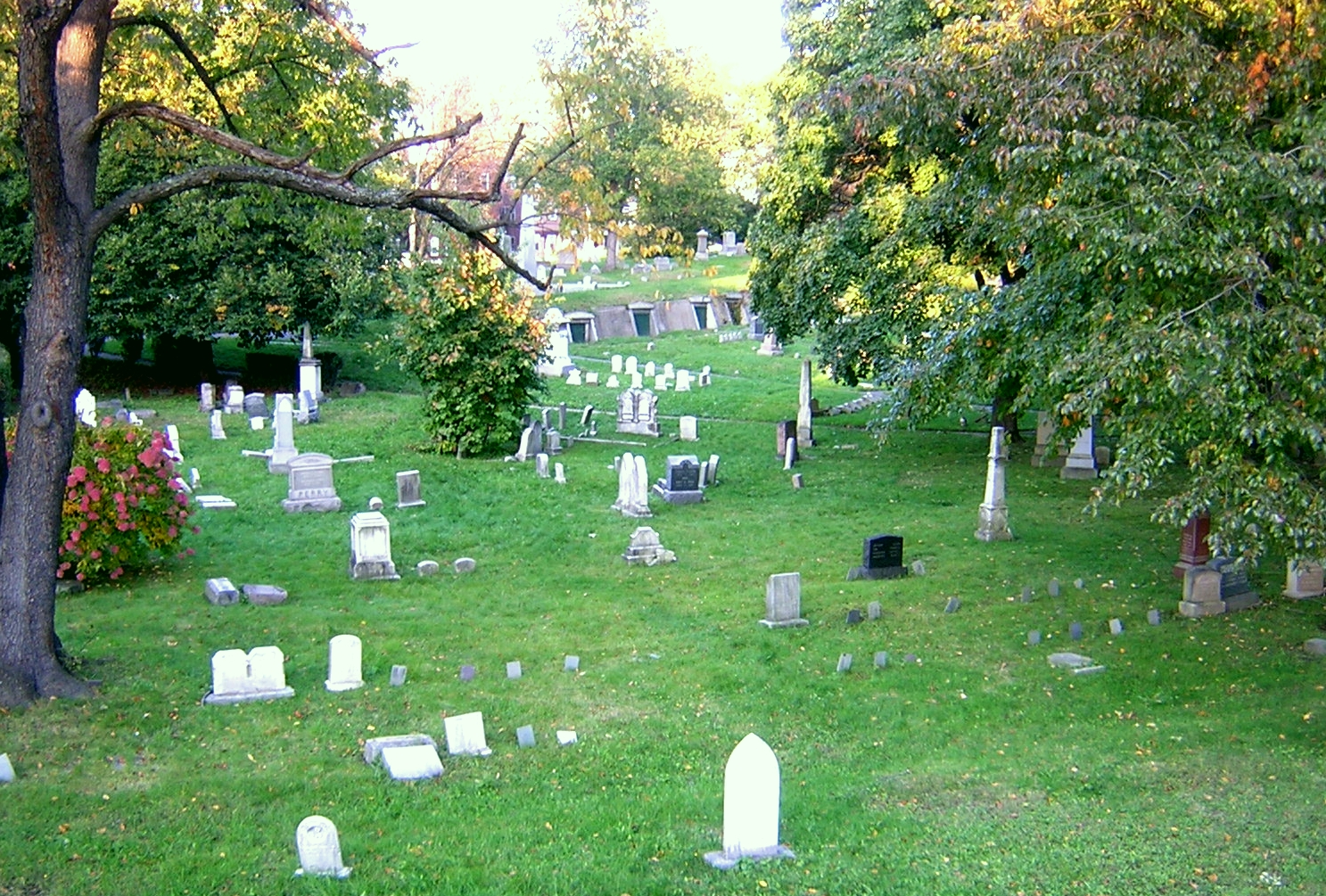

== See also ==
- National Register of Historic Places listings in Suffolk County, Massachusetts
