= Mary T. Ronan School =

- U.S. National Register of Historic Places
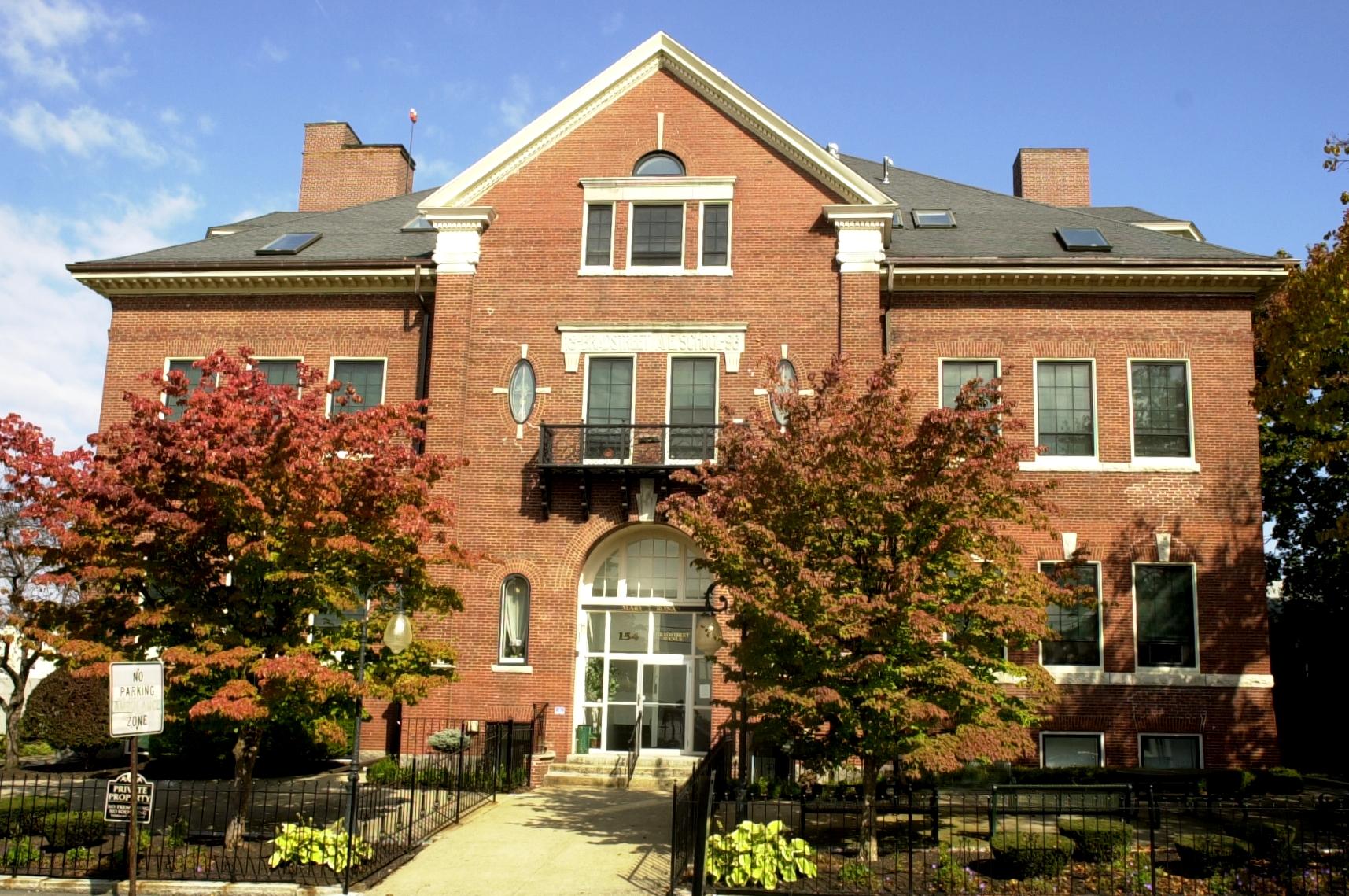

- Location within Massachusetts Location within the United States
- Location: 154 Bradstreet Ave., Revere, Massachusetts
- Coordinates: 42°23′46″N 70°59′13″W
- Area: 0.6 acres (0.24 ha)
- Built: 1896
- Architectural style: Classical Revival
- NRHP reference No.: 82000485
- Added to NRHP: December 10, 1982

The Mary T. Ronan School, originally the Bradstreet Avenue School, is a historic former school building at 154 Bradstreet Avenue in Revere, Massachusetts. The 2 1/2-story Classical Revival style brick building was built in 1896, during a period of rapid growth in the city's Beachmont neighborhood. It was eventually renamed in honor of one of its early principals. The building was converted to senior housing in 1981. It is architecturally noted for its elaborate entrance section, with full-height brick pilasters at the corners, and a round-arch opening flanked by narrow round-arch windows.

The building was added to the National Register of Historic Places in 1982.

== See also ==
- National Register of Historic Places listings in Suffolk County, Massachusetts
