= Downtown Chelsea Residential Historic District =

Historic district in Massachusetts, United States

- U.S. National Register of Historic Places
- U.S. Historic district
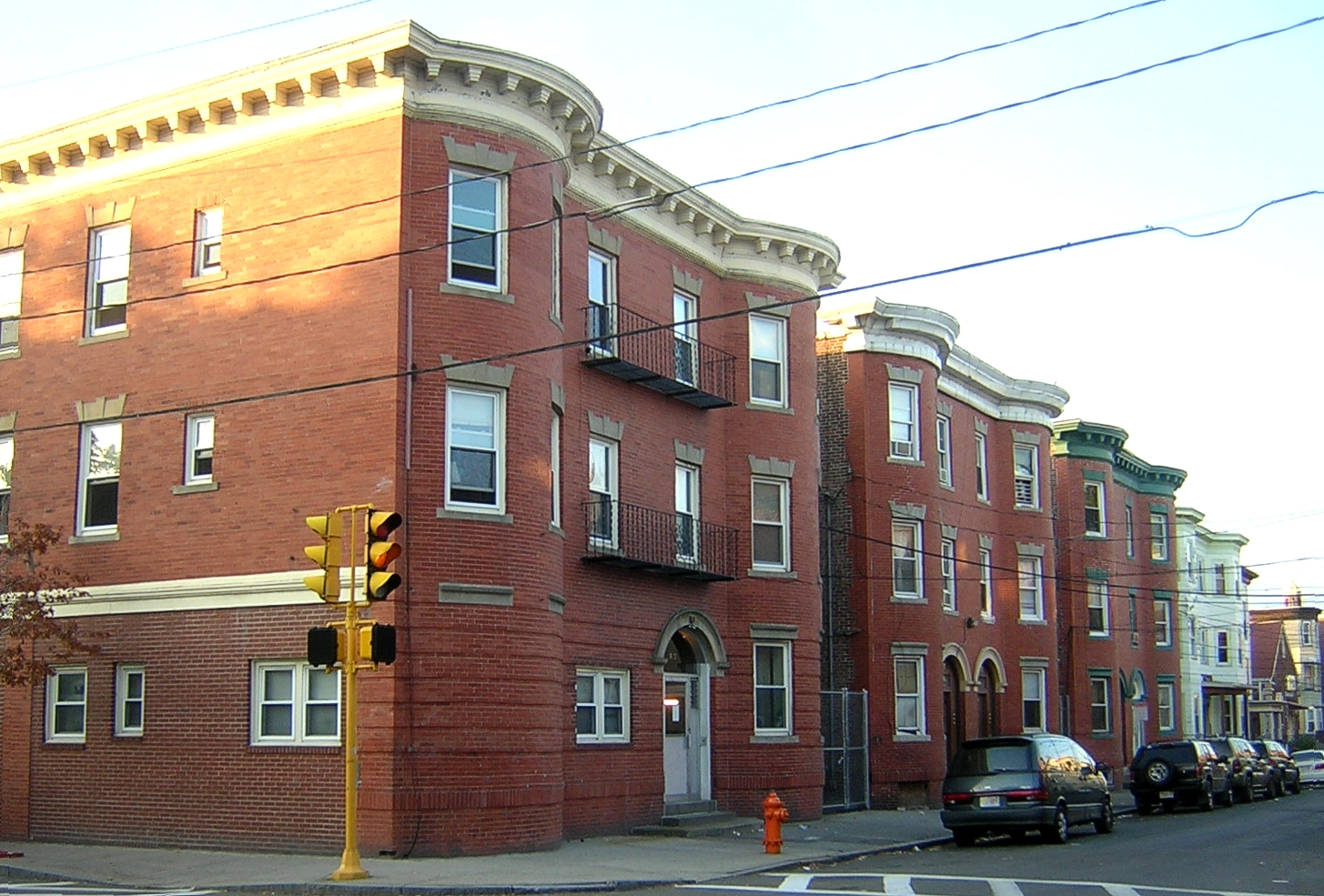
- Central Ave. and Shurtleff St., looking north

- Location within Massachusetts Location within the United States
- Location: Roughly bounded by Shurtleff, Marginal, and Division Sts. and Bellingham Sq., Chelsea, Massachusetts
- Coordinates: 42°23′21″N 71°2′15″W
- Area: 20 acres (8.1 ha)
- Built: 1908
- Architect: Eisenberg, Samuel S.
- Architectural style: Late 19th And 20th Century Revivals, Greek Revival, Italianate
- NRHP reference No.: 88000718
- Added to NRHP: June 22, 1988

The Downtown Chelsea Residential Historic District is a historic district roughly bounded by Shurtleff, Marginal, and Division Streets and Bellingham Square in Chelsea, Massachusetts.

This district incorporates the Shurtleff School (now the Early Learning Center) and period structures around the school. The area had been completely devastated in the 1908 fire and had previously contained City Hall and a number of other community buildings.

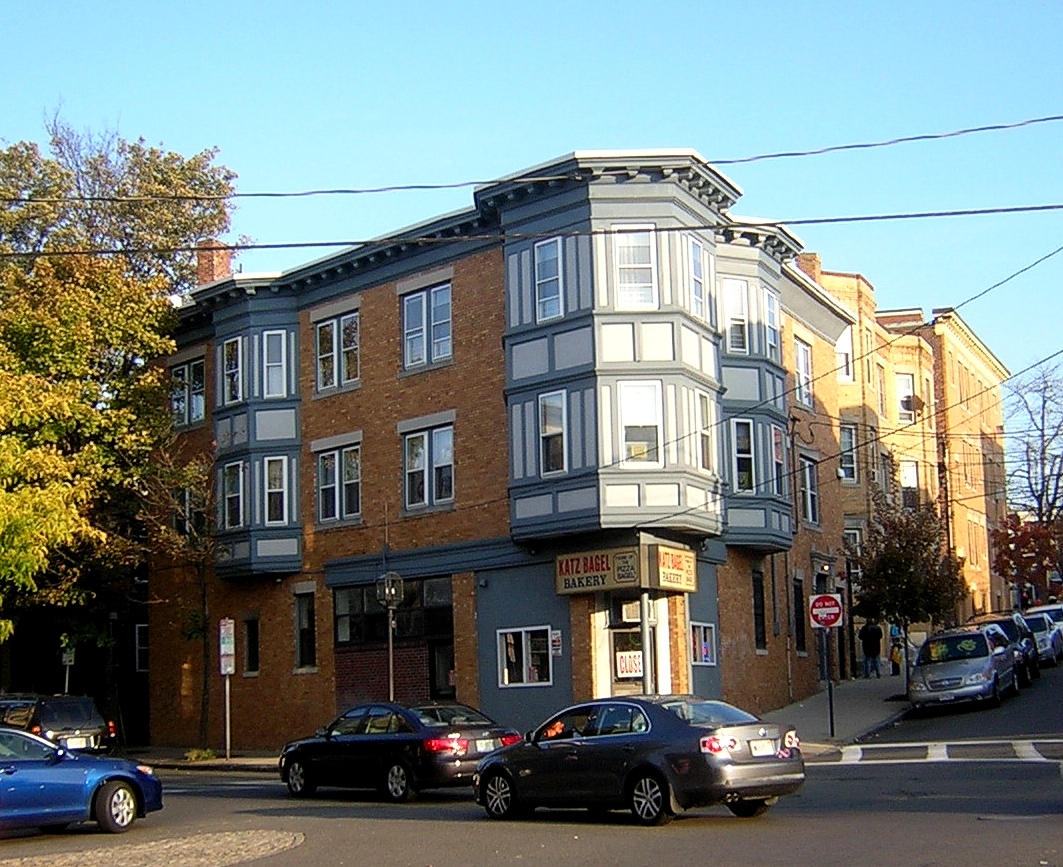

The district was listed on the National Register of Historic Places in 1988.

The 1909 construction of the school, which takes up an entire city block, spurred residential development in the area.

== See also ==
- National Register of Historic Places listings in Suffolk County, Massachusetts
