= Winthrop Center/Metcalf Square Historic District =

Historic district in Massachusetts, United States

- U.S. National Register of Historic Places
- U.S. Historic district
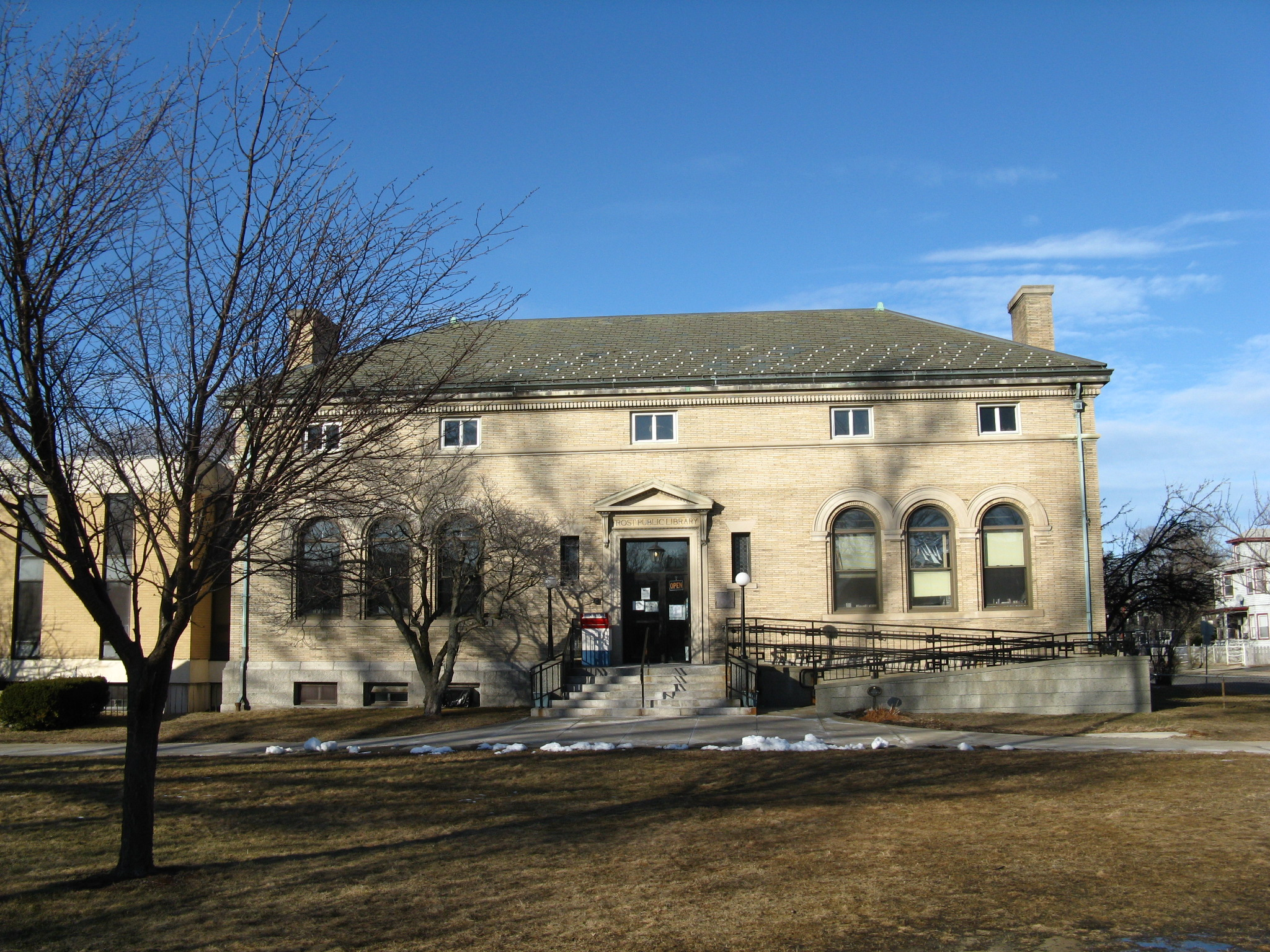
- Frost Public Library

- Location within Massachusetts Location within the United States
- Location: roughly bounded by Lincoln, Winthrop Sts., Winthrop Cemetery, Buchanan, Fremont, Pauline, Hermon and Belcher Sts., Winthrop, Massachusetts
- Coordinates: 42°22′37″N 70°59′4″W
- Area: 42 acres (17 ha)
- Built: 1795
- Architect: Bacon, Willard; Vinal, Arthur
- Architectural style: Federal, Greek Revival, Quee Anne, Colonial Revival
- NRHP reference No.: 10000098
- Added to NRHP: March 23, 2010

The Winthrop Center/Metcalf Square Historic District encompasses the historic center of the city of Winthrop, Massachusetts. Although the area was settled early in Massachusetts history (c. 1637), the Winthrop peninsula remained sparsely populated until the 19th century. Its central area did not begin significant development until there was some industrial development in the first half of the 19th century, and accelerated with the arrival of the railroad later in the 19th century. It is centered on Metcalf Square, at the junction of Pauline, Hermon, and Winthrop Streets; the district extends northward along Hermon and Winthrop, and also includes properties as far east as Cross Street.

Most of the over 100 buildings in the district are residential, and were built between about 1880 and 1940. The oldest house in the district is believed to be 257 Winthrop Street, which is thought to have been built in the 1790s and restyled with Greek Revival details in the 19th century. (This is in contrast to Winthrop's oldest house, the c. 1675 Deane Winthrop House, which lies outside the district.) The most prominent buildings are the cluster of municipal and religious buildings around Metcalf Square: the Town Hall (1929) and Library (1898) are both Renaissance Revival structures, while the police station (formerly a post office) is a Colonial Revival building from 1932, and the Methodist Church is a Colonial/Classical Revival from 1930.

There are some fine examples of well-preserved 19th-century architectural styles in the district. Noteworthy Italianate houses include 11 George Street, whose gables are studded with decorative brackets indicative of the style, and 233 Winthrop Street, the city's only towered Italianate villa. Particularly good examples of Queen Styling are found at 180 and 272 Winthrop; the latter in particular is distinguished for its turret, which has a bulbous roof and carved wooden panel decorations.

The district was listed on the National Register of Historic Places in 2010.

== See also ==
- National Register of Historic Places listings in Suffolk County, Massachusetts
