= Immaculate Conception Rectory (Revere, Massachusetts) =

- U.S. National Register of Historic Places
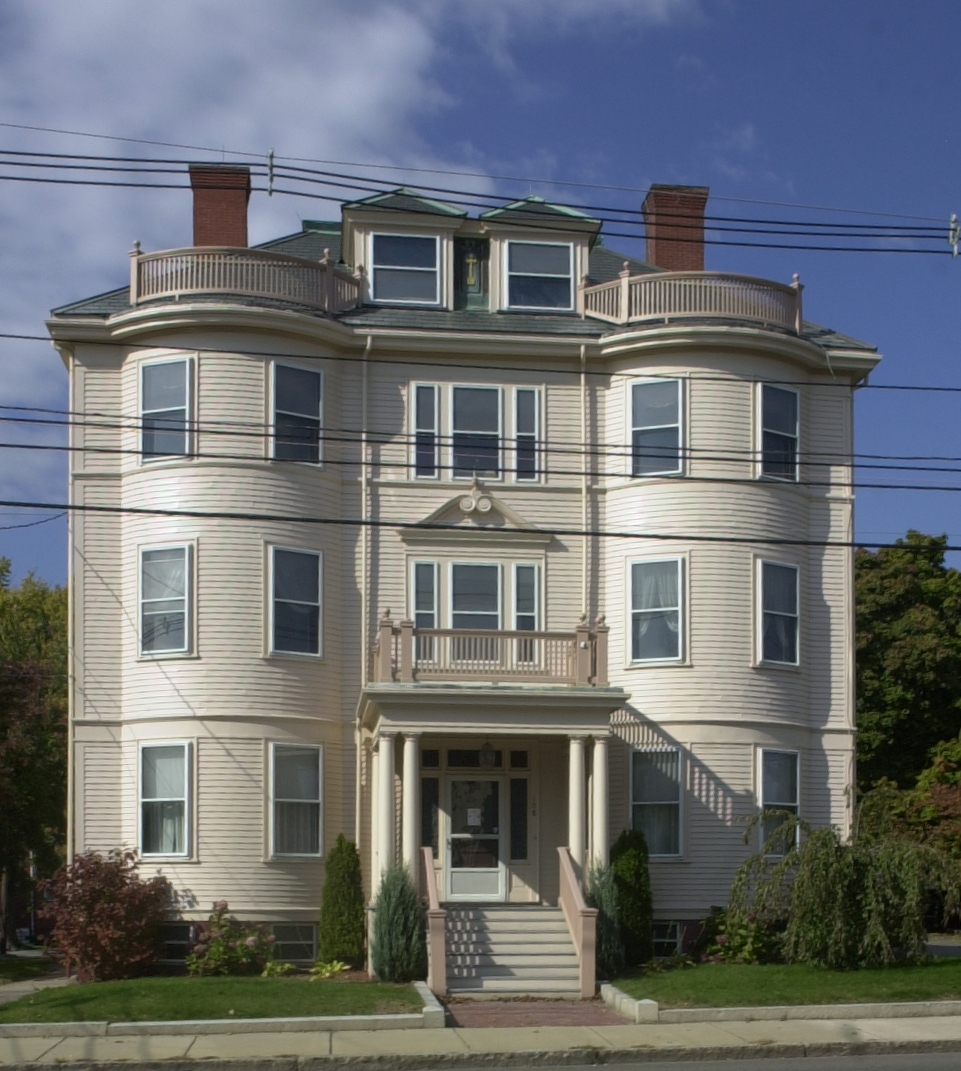

- Location within Massachusetts Location within the United States
- Location: 108 Beach St., Revere, Massachusetts
- Coordinates: 42°24′25″N 71°0′40″W
- Area: less than one acre
- Built: 1901
- Architect: McGinnis and Walsh
- Architectural style: Colonial Revival
- NRHP reference No.: 01001559
- Added to NRHP: February 11, 2002

The Immaculate Conception Rectory is a historic former Roman Catholic rectory building in Revere, Massachusetts. It is a 3 1/2-story Colonial Revival wood-frame structure, with a hipped slate roof and clapboard siding. The main facade is divided into three sections, the outer ones consisting of curved bays with two windows at each level, with a balustrade above at the roof level. The central section has the main entrance, sheltered by porch supported by grouped columns, with a balcony above. Three-part windows stand at the second and third level above the entrance, with a pair of gabled dormers piercing the roof.

The building was listed on the National Register of Historic Places in 2002. It served as the parish rectory until 1993, when the building was traded to the city in exchange for land across Beach Street, consolidating the church's land holdings. Immaculate Conception Church, located at 133 Beach Street, is still an active parish.

Today, the former Immaculate Conception Rectory houses the Museum of the Revere Society for Cultural and Historic Preservation, or the Revere History Museum. The museum is operated by the Revere Society for Cultural & Historical Preservation (RSCHP) a volunteer group sometimes known as the Revere Historical Society.

== Renovations in the 2020s ==
Following the shutdown in response to the 2019 Covid pandemic, the museum underwent building renovations to better preserve its collection. This included electrical rewiring and the installation of a new HVAC system. This work was done by students from Northeast Metro Tech. The museum's collection was also expanded. A room in the museum is now dedicated to the immigrant history of Revere.

== Gallery ==
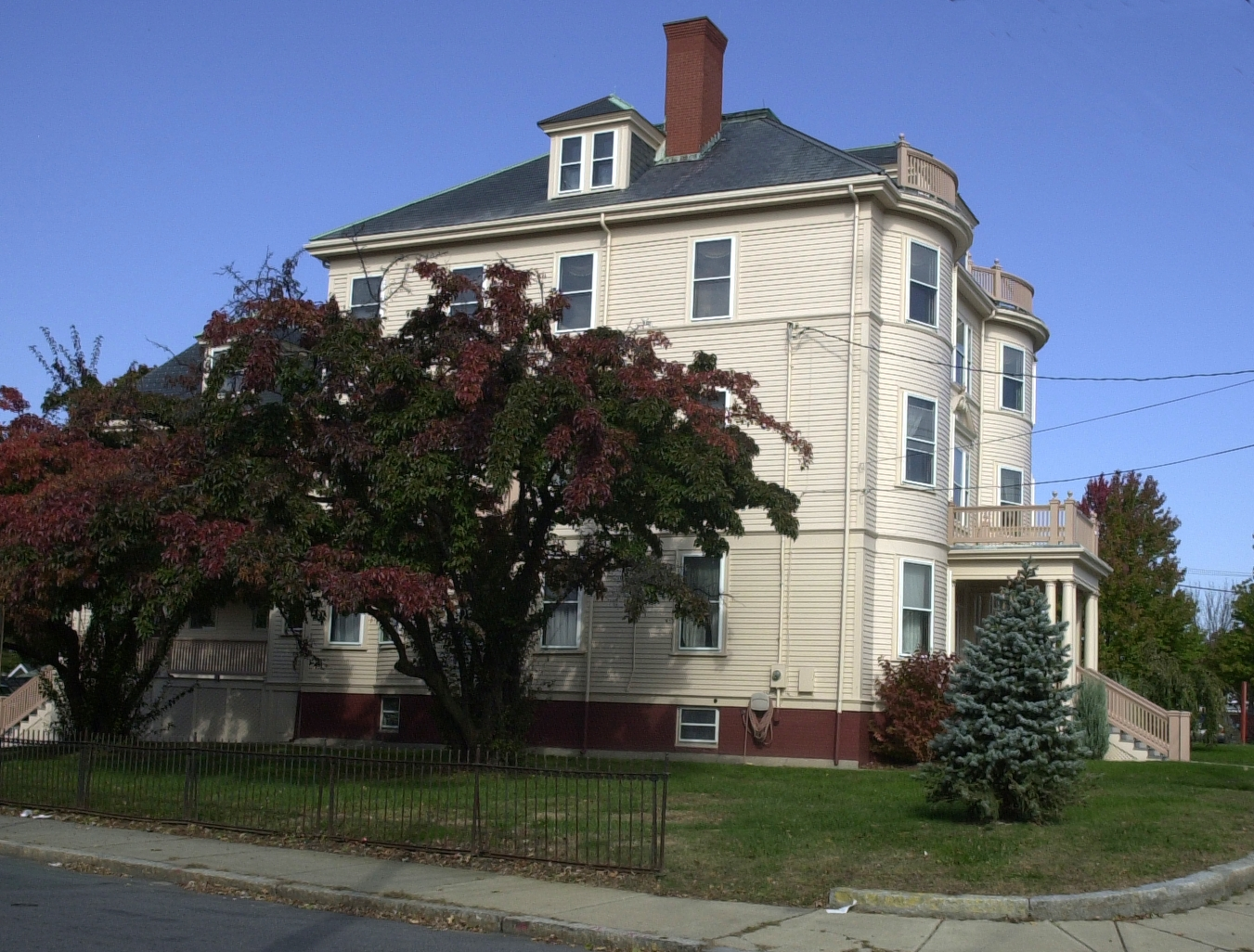

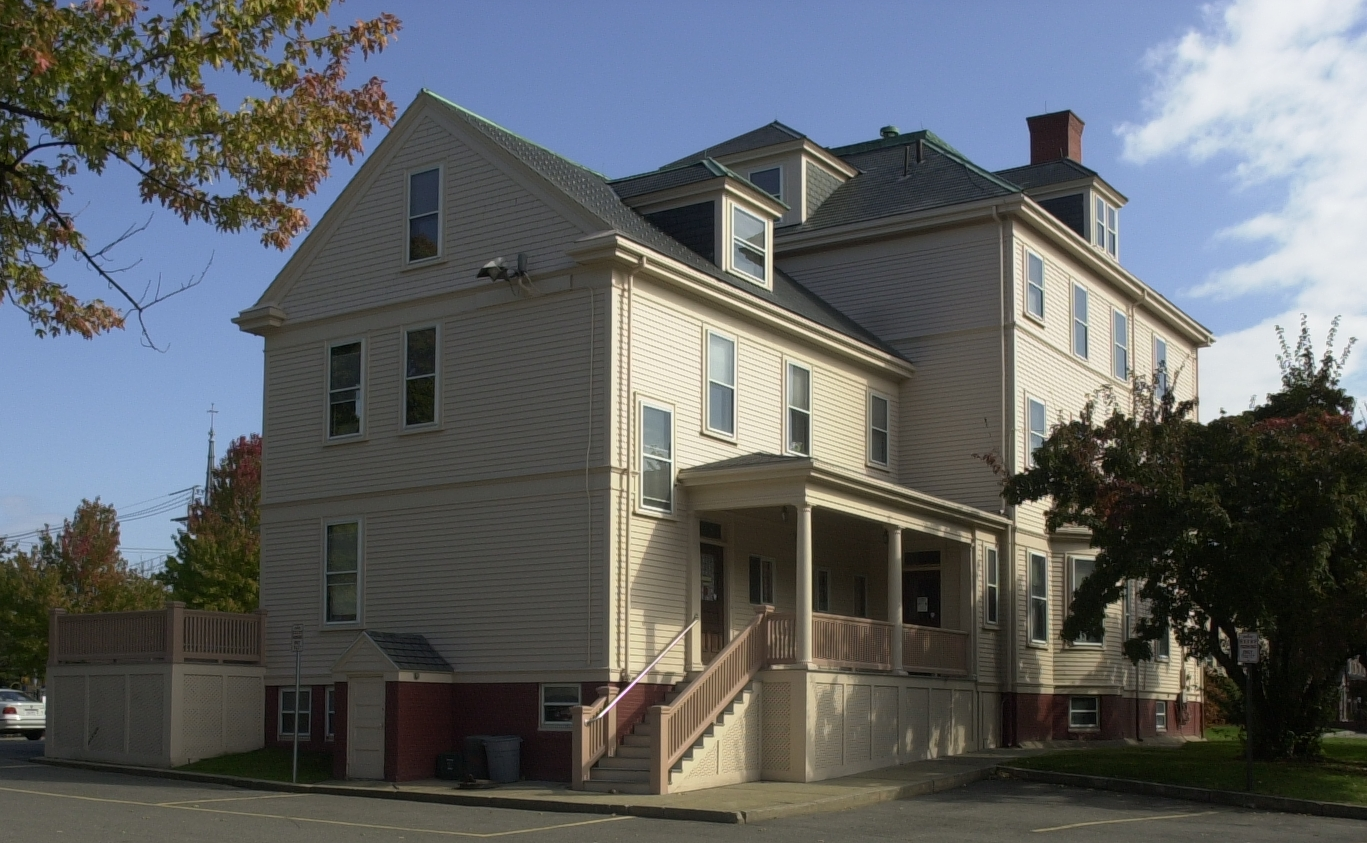

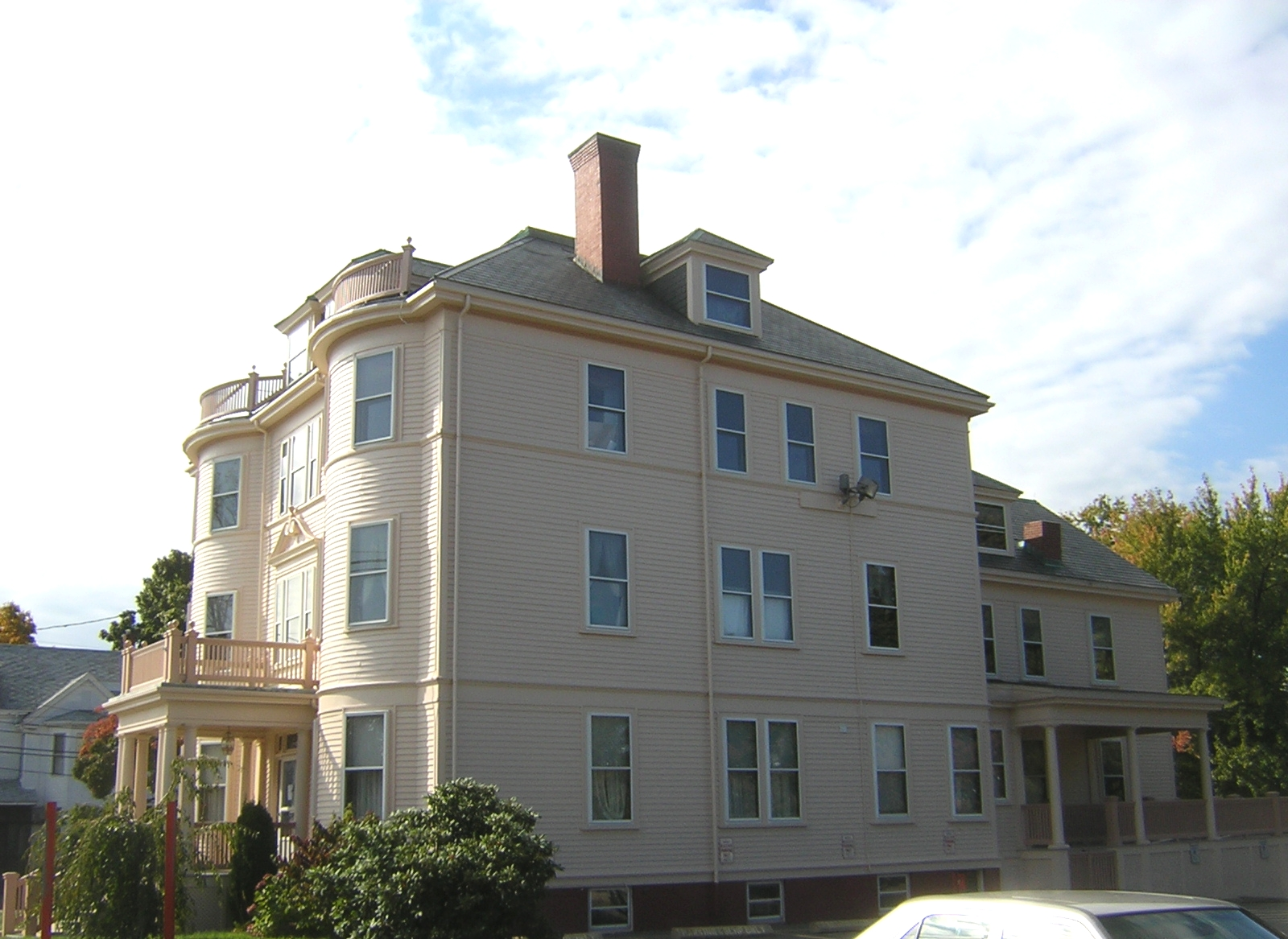

== See also ==
- National Register of Historic Places listings in Suffolk County, Massachusetts
