= Slade Spice Mill =

Tide mill in Revere, Massachusetts

- U.S. National Register of Historic Places
- Location: 770 Revere Beach Parkway, Revere, Massachusetts
- Coordinates: 42.40298°N 71.01271°W
- NRHP reference No.: 09000709
- Added to NRHP: June 30, 1972

Slade Spice Mill is a historic tide mill located in Revere, Massachusetts listed in the National Register of Historic Places. Originally built for the use of the community to grind locally grown corn, it passed hands until becoming the property of the D&L Slade Company, a prominent spice company. The building was damaged by fire and rebuilt multiple times but retains some of the early timbers, among other notable features.

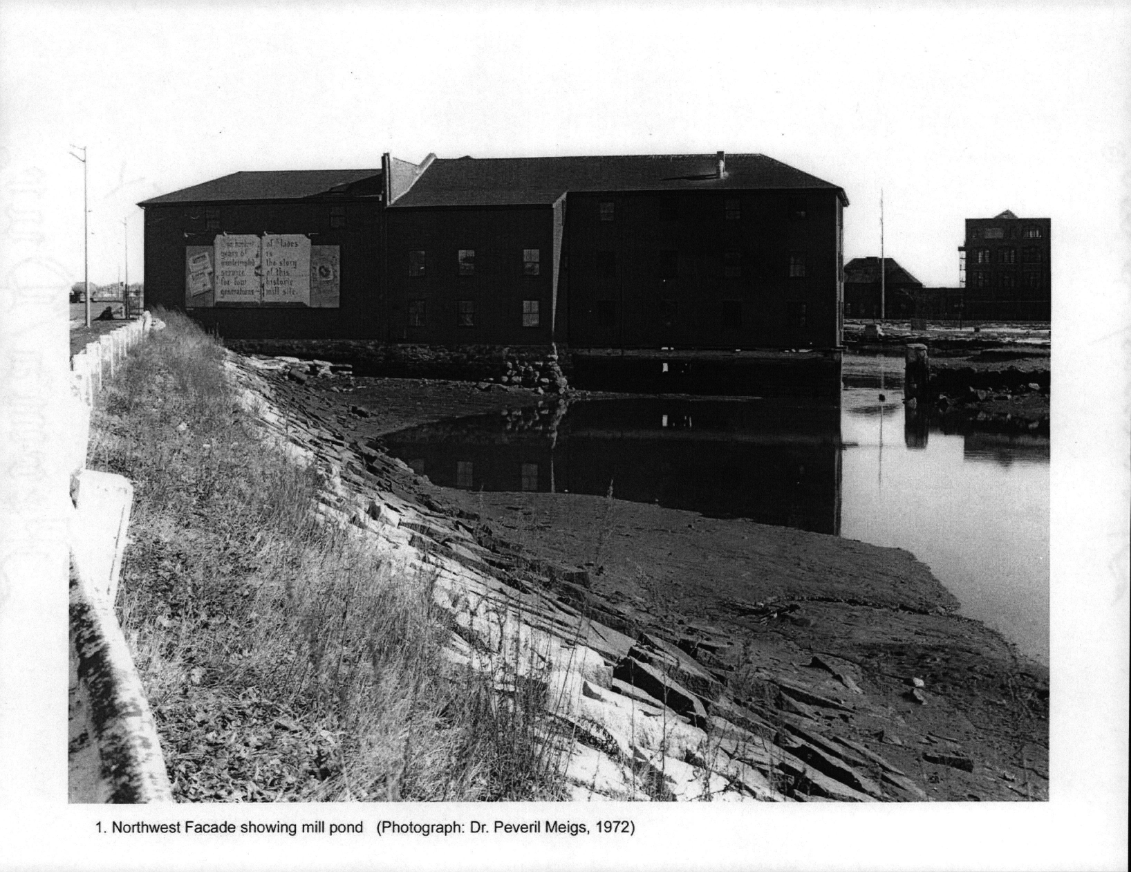
Monochrome photo of Slade Spice Mill taken in 1972 by Dr. Peveril Meigs, showing the Northwest facade of the mill.

== History ==
=== Battle of Chelsea Creek ===
The mill played a small part in the American Revolutionary War during the Battle of Chelsea Creek. Situated on Mill Creek, an estuary of the Chelsea River (otherwise known as Chelsea Creek), the mill's gates prevented the British from traveling upstream and coming within firing range of Chelsea.

=== D&L Slade Co. ===
The D & L Slade Company was a family owned business based out of the Slade Spice Mill. It began by popularizing the grinding of spices and was, at its peak, the largest spice company in New England. The company had offices and a factory in Revere's neighboring city of Boston and distributed its products globally. It also produced cookbooks in which it marketed said products.

The first member of the Slade family to come into possession of the mill was Henry Slade, a tobacconist who purchased half of the property on July 29, 1837 and used it to ground corn and snuff. Twenty-two years later, in 1859, Henry's two sons, David and Levi Slade obtained the rights to the rest of the mill.

In 1870, two years after Henry Slade's death, David and Levi Slade obtained their father's rights to the mill and dam, becoming the "sole owners of the ancient mill privileges" on Mill Creek.

Levi Slade died in January 1884. The following year, the mill officially became the property of the D&L Slade company in January, 1885. On July 18th of the same year, the mill burned down for the first time. Benjamin Shurtleff described the event in his history of Revere:

"The Forbes Lithograph Company blew its whistle to sound the alarm. Buckets of water were without success, and in less than an hour it was burned to the ground. Revere's hose carriage was brought out by Charles T. Murphy and Spencer Hawkins assisted by Thomas Foxwell's wagon. The hook and ladder truck was brought to the scene by Officer Fenno assisted by Zenas G. Baker's team. Because of insufficient length of hose in the Revere department and the delay in borrowing from the Chelsea fire department, the Chelsea company got the first stream on the burning building. The mill was doomed from the first. Mr. Amos T. Stowers had had charge of the mill for nearly thirty years, during which time he had taken only four days' vacation. The total loss was $15000. The mill was immediately rebuilt by the D. & L. Slade Company."

The mill caught fire again on July 26, 1901 and November 14, 1902, the second of which incidents caused the death of William J. Fallon, an employee of the company.

In 1918, D&L Slade Co. bought out the Bell's Seasoning Company, a major producer of poultry seasoning in New England. Bell's was started by William Bell in 1867 and remains in business as Bell's Foods.

In the 1930s, the mill was converted to electricity.

The American photographer Berenice Abbott documented the Boston headquarters of the D. & L. Slade Company circa 1934 in her work titled D & L Slade & Co. Spices, Boston, MA.

The mill was converted to apartments in 2004.
