= National Register of Historic Places listings in Winnebago County, Wisconsin =

Location of Winnebago County in Wisconsin

This is a list of the National Register of Historic Places listings in Winnebago County, Wisconsin.

This is intended to be a complete list of the properties and districts on the National Register of Historic Places in Winnebago County, Wisconsin, United States. The locations of National Register properties and districts for which the latitude and longitude coordinates are included below, may be seen in a map.

There are 93 properties and districts listed on the National Register in the county, and four former listings.

This National Park Service list is complete through NPS recent listings posted September 11, 2026.

== Current listings ==
	Name on the Register	Image	Date listed	Location	City or town	Description
1	Algoma Boulevard Historic District	Algoma Boulevard Historic District	December 1, 1994 (#94001368)	Roughly Algoma Boulevard from Woodland Ave. to Hollister Ave. 44°02′01″N 88°33′23″W	Oshkosh	String of large, elaborate homes, once known as the "Gold Coast" of Oshkosh. Many were built by lumber barons and officers of their companies. Notable examples of different styles are the 1857 Greek Revival Kohlmann house, the 1868 Italianate Anthes house, the 1888 Queen Anne Charles Wood house, the 1897 Shingle-style Ideson-Osborn house, the 1911 Richardsonian Romanesque Moses Hooper house, the 1908 Tudor Revival Sawyer house, the 1911 Colonial Revival Schriber house, the 1917 Wright-designed Prairie Style Hunt house, and the 1926 Mediterranean Revival Converse house.
2	Algoma Boulevard Methodist Church	Algoma Boulevard Methodist Church	December 3, 1974 (#74000140)	1174 Algoma Boulevard; 44°01′55″N 88°33′19″W	Oshkosh	Richardsonian Romanesque Methodist church designed by Oshkosh architect William Waters and built in 1892. Prominent Oshkosh families belonged, including the Paines, Sawyers and Hicks.
3	Gustav Augustin Block	Gustav Augustin Block	May 30, 1986 (#86001181)	68 Racine St. 44°12′07″N 88°26′46″W	Menasha	This 1894 building is now the "most complete example of late 19th century commercial vernacular form in Menasha." German immigrant Gustav worked his way up from farming and factory work to running a grocery in the first floor of this building and living upstairs.
4	Havilah Babcock House	Havilah Babcock House	August 7, 1974 (#74000141)	537 E. Wisconsin Ave. 44°10′51″N 88°26′59″W	Neenah	Well-preserved 2.5 story Queen Anne home with 3-story round tower and touches of Eastlake style, Stick style, and Tudor Revival, designed by Waters and completed in 1883. Interior furnishings are mostly Eastlake, chosen by Havilah Babcock, one of the four founders of Kimberly, Clark and Co.
5	George, Sr., and Ellen Banta House	George, Sr., and Ellen Banta House	May 5, 1997 (#97000366)	348 Naymut St. 44°11′47″N 88°26′38″W	Menasha	Two-story house built in 1878 and restyled to Queen Anne in 1888. In that year George began printing with a small press in the dining room of this house. That operation expanded to the modern Banta Corporation, which survived to 2006.
6	Baumann Block		August 29, 2024 (#100010774)	1124-1128 Oregon Street; 44°00′27″N 88°32′33″W	Oshkosh	Queen Anne-style corner business block built in 1894 - two stories of brick with rusticated limestone trim and a corner oriel. The block initially housed a butcher shop in the corner storefront and a grocery store in the other. In 1910 the grocery store was converted to a nickelodeon called the Star Theater. Later housed a dry cleaner, office space, and antique store.
7	Edward D. & Vina Shattuck Beals House	Edward D. & Vina Shattuck Beals House	February 27, 2008 (#08000121)	220 N. Park Ave. 44°11′16″N 88°26′50″W	Neenah	Arts and Crafts-styled home overlooking the Fox River, designed by Alexander Eschweiler in the manner of British architect Charles Voysey in 1911. Edward led a door manufacturing business and Vina was a Kimberly-Clark heiress.
8	George O. Bergstrom House	George O. Bergstrom House	March 22, 1993 (#93000144)	579 E. Wisconsin Ave. 44°10′50″N 88°26′59″W	Neenah	Queen Anne home with two towers, built in 1894, probably designed by Waters. Bergstrom immigrated from Norway in 1851, co-founded Bergstrom Brothers Stove Works, and served as mayor and director of banks in Neenah and Kaukauna. His son co-designed the Pentagon.
9	Black Oak School	Black Oak School	June 25, 1987 (#87001062)	5028 S. Green Bay Rd. 43°56′42″N 88°34′56″W	Nekimi	Second-generation one-room school, with hipped roof and bell tower, built around 1900.
10	Abraham Briggs Bowen House	Abraham Briggs Bowen House	April 22, 1982 (#82000731)	1010 Bayshore Dr. 44°00′37″N 88°31′29″W	Oshkosh	Ornate early Italianate house built in 1856 for Bowen, real estate developer and investor in Michigan lumber. Later divided into rental units.
11	Brainerd Site	Brainerd Site	September 7, 1984 (#84003823)	Address Restricted	Neenah	
12	Brooklyn No. 4 Fire House	Brooklyn No. 4 Fire House	January 11, 1996 (#95001505)	17 W. 6th Ave. 44°00′44″N 88°32′19″W	Oshkosh	Italianate-styled fire house designed by William Waters and built in 1868, after major fires in 1859 and 1866. By the time it closed in 1946, #4 spanned the transitions from volunteer firemen to professionals, from mobile pumps to hose wagons, and from horses to motorized trucks.
13	Carpenter Site (47 Wn 246)	Carpenter Site (47 Wn 246)	April 7, 1982 (#82000725)	Address Restricted	Eureka	Archeological site beside the Fox River where gunflints, tinkling cones, and beads were found.
14	Chicago and Northwestern Railroad Depot	Chicago and Northwestern Railroad Depot	March 7, 1994 (#94000134)	500 N. Commercial St. 44°11′35″N 88°27′23″W	Neenah	Hip-roofed red-brick depot of the C&NW, designed by Charles Sumner Frost in Richardsonian Romanesque style. Built in 1892, remodeled in 1942, and in service until 1982.
15	Cole Watch Tower	Cole Watch Tower	June 9, 1978 (#78000148)	West of Omro on Highway 21; 44°02′51″N 88°46′54″W	Omro	7-story brick and steel tower added in 1935 to an Italianate farmhouse built in the 1870s. The tower provided living quarters, but also a perch from which the Coles could watch their fox pens without disturbing the animals.
16	Daily Northwestern Building	Daily Northwestern Building	May 13, 1982 (#82000732)	224 State St. 44°01′00″N 88°32′09″W	Oshkosh	Newspaper office and production building designed by Auler, Jensen & Brown of Oshkosh in Neo-Italian Renaissance style and built in 1930. The Daily Northwestern, founded in 1860 and guided by John Hicks, became one of the strongest Republican papers in the state, and is the only survivor of the early papers.
17	Doty Island (47-WN-30)	Doty Island (47-WN-30)	June 20, 1985 (#85001368)	Address Restricted	Menasha	
18	Doty Island Village Site	Doty Island Village Site	January 19, 1996 (#95001552)	Address Restricted; 44°11′19″N 88°26′19″W	Neenah	
19	East Forest Avenue Historic District	East Forest Avenue Historic District	November 9, 2005 (#05001229)	Generally bounded by E. Forest Ave., Webster St., Hewitt St., and 11th St. 44°11′27″N 88°26′44″W	Neenah	Well-to-do neighborhood with 27 contributing properties, including the 1882 Italianate/Second Empire Syme-Gilbert House, several Queen Anne houses listed below, the 1904 Colonial Revival/Queen Anne Gilbert-Lachmann House pictured at left, the 1915 Arts & Crafts/Craftsman Pfeiffer-Kimberley house, the 1924 American Foursquare Seiler House, and the 1937 International-styled Bellack House.
20	Equitable Fraternal Union Building	Equitable Fraternal Union Building	January 19, 2016 (#15000989)	116 S. Commercial St. 44°11′09″N 88°27′44″W	Neenah	Meeting hall of a fraternal life insurance society, designed by William Waters in Neoclassical style and built in 1908.
21	Eureka Lock and Lock Tender's House	Eureka Lock and Lock Tender's House	September 29, 1976 (#76000082)	South of Eureka on the Fox River; 43°59′45″N 88°52′18″W	Eureka	200x35 foot navigation lock built of wood in 1876 as part of the Fox–Wisconsin Waterway and rebuilt of concrete in 1941, with lock-tender's house built in 1878. Now the only operating lock on the upper Fox, since a revamp by the Berlin Boat Club in 2012.
22	First Methodist Church	First Methodist Church	March 17, 1995 (#95000247)	502 N. Main St. 44°01′12″N 88°32′13″W	Oshkosh	Unusual (in Wisconsin) urban church building with storefronts at street-level. The building was begun as an opera house, until damaged by a fire in 1874. At that point the Methodist congregation bought it and completed it as a Neo-Classical-styled church. After they moved to a new building in 1970, it was used by Boys' Club and as a homeless shelter.
23	First Presbyterian Church	First Presbyterian Church	December 27, 1974 (#74000142)	110 Church Ave. 44°01′14″N 88°32′19″W	Oshkosh	Picturesque Richardsonian Romanesque church designed by W. A. Holbrook and built in 1893 by Presbyterian congregation.
24	Fraternal Order of Eagles	Fraternal Order of Eagles	February 21, 2018 (#100002140)	405 Washington Ave. 44°01′04″N 88°31′57″W	Oshkosh	Tudor Revival-styled Eagles' meeting hall designed by Henry Auler and built by Alfred Ganther in 1924, with ballrooms above and a bowling alley in the basement.
25	Fraternal Reserve Association	Fraternal Reserve Association	February 2, 2016 (#15001048)	105 Washington Ave. 44°01′04″N 88°32′10″W	Oshkosh	4-story office building designed by local architect Henry Auler in Neoclassical style and built 1913-14 to house a fraternal insurance company which merged with Equitable Fraternal Union of Neenah in 1930. A.k.a. the Washington Building.
26	Frontenac	Frontenac	April 22, 1982 (#82000733)	132-140 High St. and 9 Brown St. 44°01′05″N 88°32′22″W	Oshkosh	2-story Victorian apartment building, mixing Queen Anne style and Richardsonian Romanesque, built from 1893 to 1899 by Joseph T. Raycraft. Largely unchanged since.
27	Hans Gram House	Hans Gram House	July 2, 1987 (#87001123)	345 E. Wisconsin Ave. 44°11′01″N 88°27′19″W	Neenah	2-story frame home with Queen Anne and Italianate influences, built in 1887. Hans operated a dry goods store.
28	Grand Loggery	Grand Loggery	March 22, 1974 (#74000143)	Doty Park (Lincoln St.); 44°11′14″N 88°26′53″W	Neenah	Large house of squared logs built in 1845 by James Doty, territorial judge, land developer (of Madison in particular), and governor of Wisconsin Territory and Utah Territory. Mrs. Doty is said to have named the house. Reconstructed in 1948 and now a museum.
29	Augustin Grignon Hotel	Augustin Grignon Hotel	April 14, 1975 (#75000084)	Southeastern corner of the junction of Main and Washington Sts. 44°05′58″N 88°39′12″W	Butte des Morts	Early inn/trading post built in 1843 by Augustin Grignon on the Tomahawk Trail, which ran from Green Bay to Prairie du Chien. The Greek Revival building housed a trading post, post office and saloon on the first floor and guest rooms on the second. It is one of the oldest wooden buildings in the state.
30	Richard Guenther House	Richard Guenther House	March 1, 1984 (#84003824)	1200 Washington Ave. 44°01′05″N 88°31′18″W	Oshkosh	Large Queen Anne house designed by Waters and built in 1888 for Richard W. Guenther, a Prussian immigrant, Oshkosh druggist, Wisconsin state treasurer, US Congressman, and diplomat. From 1906 to 1913 the large house also hosted the new Lakeside Sanitorium and Training School for Nurses, which later evolved into Mercy Medical Center.
31	Frank Winchester Hawks House	Frank Winchester Hawks House	May 9, 1997 (#97000430)	433 E. Wisconsin Ave. 44°10′57″N 88°27′14″W	Neenah	Shingle-style home built in 1904. Frank was an Indiana furniture manufacturer who married Helen Howard, and joined her father's paper-making business. Their son, film director Howard Hawks, spent part of his boyhood in the house.
32	Jessie Jack Hooper House	Jessie Jack Hooper House	December 18, 1978 (#78000151)	1149 Algoma Boulevard; 44°01′52″N 88°33′20″W	Oshkosh	Home of women's suffrage leader Jessie Jack Hooper. The house and matching coach house are Shingle style, designed by Waters and built in 1888. Her husband Benjamin was a grocery wholesaler. Jessie also organized women's war work during World War I, presided over the Wisconsin League of Women Voters in the 20s, and was involved in anti-war campaigns in the 30s.
33	Irving-Church Historic District	Irving-Church Historic District	March 7, 1994 (#94000156)	Roughly bounded by W. Irving Ave., Franklin St., Church Ave., Wisconsin St., and Amherst Ave. 44°01′23″N 88°32′45″W	Oshkosh	Large residential district of homes built from 1858 to 1938, dominated by Queen Anne homes like the 1880 Edward Jones house. Other styles are represented, including the 1878 Italianate Rogers house, the 1900 NeoClassical Radford house, the 1914 Craftsman/Prairie Style Davis house, the 1921 Mediterranean Revival Foster house, the 1924 Clark(?) Bungalow, and the 1938 Tudor Revival Zielke house.
34	Ellis Jennings House	Ellis Jennings House	March 20, 1992 (#92000110)	711 E. Forest Ave. 44°11′24″N 88°26′54″W	Neenah	Queen Anne home designed by Waters and built in 1893. Jennings was a partner in a small lumber business.
35	Rev. Jens N. Jersild House	Rev. Jens N. Jersild House	September 2, 2003 (#03000898)	331 E. Wisconsin Ave. 44°11′03″N 88°27′24″W	Neenah	Queen Anne house with Colonial Revival veranda, built in 1886. Danish immigrant Jersild was a Lutheran minister who was a key player in a doctrinal battle that split the Danish Lutheran Church of America. He was also a publisher, and founder of the Jersild Knitting Company.
36	Isabel and Orrin Johnson House		June 26, 2024 (#100010486)	1002 East Forest Avenue; 44°11′25″N 88°26′39″W	Neenah	In 1901 Isabel Bacon Smith, wife of Charles R. Smith of Menasha Woodenware, had a Queen Anne-style house built on this site for her mother to live in. After Charles died in 1916, Isabel married matinee idol Orrin Johnson and had the house enlarged and completely remodeled in Arts and Crafts style outside and Georgian Revival style inside, before the two moved in.
37	Kamrath Site	Kamrath Site	May 6, 1975 (#75000085)	Address Restricted	Winneconne	Paleo-Indian and Archaic archaeological site, which has produced many rhyolite adzes.
38	Judge J.C. Kerwin House	Judge J.C. Kerwin House	August 16, 1996 (#96000907)	516 E. Forest Ave. 44°11′26″N 88°26′58″W	Neenah	Queen Anne house with Georgian Revival influences built in 1885. Kerwin was a son of Menasha who successfully opposed railroad and utility interests as a local attorney, served as Neenah city attorney, on the UW Board of Regents, and on the state Supreme Court.
39	Kimberly Point Park Lighthouse	Kimberly Point Park Lighthouse	February 5, 2013 (#12001275)	290 Lake Shore Ave. 44°11′08″N 88°26′30″W	Neenah	A gift from J. C. Kimberly, built in 1945 to serve as a rest stop, a guide into Neenah harbor, and a landmark for boat races. Also known as Neenah Light.
40	Carl Koch Block	Carl Koch Block	July 10, 1986 (#86001539)	2 Tayco St. 44°11′56″N 88°27′11″W	Menasha	Elegant brick commercial building built in 1882 in the business district near the Butte des Morts Bridge. The first floor housed a saloon and Bavarian immigrant Koch's own dry goods store. Koch lived on the second floor and rented out an apartment there.
41	Larson Brothers Airport	Larson Brothers Airport	April 5, 1984 (#84003825)	Highway 150; 44°12′10″N 88°38′19″W	Clayton	Early Wisconsin airport, opened in 1922 by the four Larson brothers, with the original sod landing field and a hangar constructed with barn-building techniques. The Larsons were the first agency in Wisconsin to sell government-approved planes.
42	Lasley's Point Site	Lasley's Point Site	September 6, 1979 (#79000120)	5900 Lasley Point Road; 44°07′37″N 88°41′38″W	Winneconne	This site of an Oneota village from 1200 to 1500 AD contained garden beds, cache pits, bone tools, shells, human bones, copper flakes, charcoal and pottery.
43	Perry Lindsley House	Perry Lindsley House	September 2, 2003 (#03000899)	1102 E. Forest Ave. 44°11′33″N 88°26′36″W	Neenah	Modest but classic 1893 Shingle-style home designed by Waters.
44	Robert Lutz House	Robert Lutz House	May 27, 1982 (#82000734)	1449 Knapp St. 44°00′17″N 88°33′47″W	Oshkosh	1910 limestone Queen Anne/eclectic house with porte-cochere, designed by Waters. Also a matching brick barn built in 1925 for Lutz's Belgians, and a pigeon coop. The limestone came from Lutz's quarry nearby. He also helped found the State Bank of Oshkosh.
45	Mayer-Banderob House	Mayer-Banderob House	September 23, 1999 (#99001174)	809 Ceape Ave. 44°00′53″N 88°31′36″W	Oshkosh	Brick Italianate home built around 1868 for Bavarian immigrant George Mayer, the first jeweler in Oshkosh. John Banderob lived in the house from 1890 to 1921. He was also a German immigrant, Civil War veteran, furniture manufacturer, and progressive six-term mayor of Oshkosh.
46	Menasha Dam	Menasha Dam	December 7, 1993 (#93001330)	Fox River at Mill St. 44°11′58″N 88°26′48″W	Menasha	402 foot concrete dam rebuilt in 1937 to replace earlier wooden dams. All were built as part of the Fox-Wisconsin Waterway, to flood the Menasha lock and raise or lower boats between Lake Winnebago and Little Lake Butte des Morts.
47	Menasha Lock Site	Menasha Lock Site	January 5, 1998 (#93001323)	Address Restricted	Menasha	
48	Metzig Garden Site (47WN283)	Metzig Garden Site (47WN283)	December 29, 1988 (#88003070)	Address Restricted	Wolf River	Paleo-indian archeological site which has produced two distinct types of early projectile points, and hints at their sequencing.
49	John R. Morgan House	John R. Morgan House	October 14, 1983 (#83004365)	234 Church Ave. 44°01′18″N 88°32′28″W	Oshkosh	Elaborate Queen Anne home with octagonal tower, designed and built by Bell and Cole of Oshkosh in 1884. Morgan was an immigrant from Wales, a civic leader, and a principal of Morgan Brothers, a large sash, door and blind company.
50	Neenah United States Post Office	Neenah United States Post Office	November 8, 1990 (#90001743)	307 S. Commercial St. 44°11′06″N 88°27′48″W	Neenah	Georgian Revival post office with fanlight and palladian window, built 1916-18.
51	North Main Street Bungalow Historic District	North Main Street Bungalow Historic District	September 25, 2013 (#13000783)	North Main St. generally bounded by Nevada & Huron Aves. 44°02′14″N 88°32′15″W	Oshkosh	Neighborhood of homes constructed from 1908 to 1930, predominantly Craftsman bungalows built by middle-class carpenters, railroad men, machinists, salesmen, etc.
52	North Main Street Historic District	North Main Street Historic District	March 7, 1996 (#96000250)	Roughly N. Main St. from Parkway Ave. to Algoma Boulevard, and Market St. northwest to High Ave. 44°01′11″N 88°32′16″W	Oshkosh	The old commercial downtown of Oshkosh, rebuilt after the fires of 1874 and 1875 in brick to replace the previous wood buildings. Notable examples of different styles include the Waters-designed 1876 Italianate Beckwith House Hotel, the 1895 Queen Anne Webster Block, the 1907 Soldiers Monument at Market and High Ave., the 1926 Modern Broadfront-styled Foute-Slate Auto Company, and the 1927 Neo-Gothic/Art Deco Raulf Hotel.
53	Omro Downtown Historic District	Omro Downtown Historic District	March 7, 1996 (#96000248)	Junction of Main St. and S. Webster Ave. 44°02′22″N 88°44′41″W	Omro	Omro's old commercial downtown, including the 1871 Race Hardware store Building, the 1874 Northwestern Hotel, the 1881 Frank Building, the 1894 I.O.O.F. Building, the 1890-95 Earl & McGuire grocery building, and the 1927 Anton Bank Meat Market.
54	Omro High School, Annex and Webster Manual Training School	Omro High School, Annex and Webster Manual Training School	June 19, 1985 (#85001369)	515 S. Webster St. 44°02′07″N 88°44′43″W	Omro	The old middle-school complex, consisting of the Romanesque Revival/Italianate high school built 1893 and 1909, the 1906 Romanesque Webster building, and the Annex built in 1934. The Webster Manual Training School was one of the early vocational-ed schools in the state.
55	Omro Village Hall and Engine House	Omro Village Hall and Engine House	April 14, 1997 (#97000327)	144 E. Main St. 44°02′21″N 88°44′37″W	Omro	Late Victorian municipal building with a 3.5 (or 5?) story tower, designed by Fred G. Root and built in 1896 to house Omro's village offices, fire department, and jail. Now houses the museum.
56	Orville Beach Memorial Manual Training School	Orville Beach Memorial Manual Training School	September 12, 1985 (#85002334)	240 Algoma Boulevard; 44°01′11″N 88°32′25″W	Oshkosh	Built in 1911, this was one of the earliest vocational-tech schools in Wisconsin. Building is a 3-story Neoclassical design of Waters. Orville ran lumber mills, was involved in banks, and helped found the Oshkosh and Mississippi Railroad. His wife Helen gave the city a large endowment to found the school.
57	Oshkosh Grand Opera House	Oshkosh Grand Opera House	January 21, 1974 (#74000144)	100 High Ave. 44°01′02″N 88°32′19″W	Oshkosh	Cream-brick Victorian opera house designed by Waters and built in 1883, hosting Caruso, the Barrymores, James Whitcomb Riley, Jenny Lind, Mark Twain, and others. Converted to a movie theater in 1949, and restored to a live theater in the 1980s.
58	Oshkosh State Normal School Historic District	Oshkosh State Normal School Historic District	December 6, 1984 (#84000722)	Buildings at 800, 842, and 912 Algoma Boulevard, and 845 Elmwood Ave. 44°01′45″N 88°33′04″W	Oshkosh	Buildings of the old teachers training school, including the 1912 Industrial Education Building and the 1917 Administration and Science Building designed by Van Ryn & DeGelleke, and the 1926 Swart Training School designed by Arthur Peabody, along with the Oviatt house described elsewhere on this page.
59	Overton Archeological District	Overton Archeological District	May 2, 1975 (#75000086)	Address Restricted	Oshkosh	
60	Oviatt House	Oviatt House	August 27, 1979 (#79000121)	842 Algoma Boulevard; 44°01′38″N 88°33′06″W	Oshkosh	Victorian house with an exterior of rough blue limestone and corner tower, designed by Waters and built in 1883 for Moses Hooper. Hooper was an Oshkosh attorney who represented Kimberly-Clark among others, and was such an authority on riparian rights that he appeared before the US Supreme Court repeatedly. In 1900 the house was bought by Dr. Charles Oviatt, a noted surgeon who insisted that nuns assisting in surgery wear sterilized garb rather than woolen habits, and eventually received a letter of agreement from Pope Leo XIII.
61	Henry Paepke House	Henry Paepke House	March 13, 1987 (#87000462)	251 E. Doty Ave. 44°11′01″N 88°27′30″W	Neenah	1885 house built by Paepke himself in Stick style, which is unusual in the Fox valley. Paepke was a German immigrant building contractor who worked on St. Mary's Catholic Church of Menasha and Menasha City Hall.
62	Paine Art Center and Arboretum	Paine Art Center and Arboretum	December 1, 1978 (#78000152)	1410 Algoma Boulevard; 44°02′07″N 88°33′30″W	Oshkosh	Rambling English-like country house with gardens, designed in Tudor Revival style by Bryant Fleming and built from 1927 to 1947 by lumberman Nathan Paine as a home, and as a gift to his community. Now an art museum and arboretum.
63	Paine Lumber Company Historic District	Paine Lumber Company Historic District	June 26, 1986 (#86001392)	Off Congress Ave. roughly between High, New York, and Summit Aves., and a Paine Lumber access road 44°02′01″N 88°33′51″W	Oshkosh	Edward Paine founded a lumber mill here on the east bank of the Fox in 1853. His sons and grandson developed the enterprise, steering it through the Oshkosh Woodworkers Strike of 1898 and growing it into the largest sash and door company in the world in 1929. Remnants include row houses for workers, a company bank, and the dockwall along the river.
64	William E. Pollock Residence	William E. Pollock Residence	December 6, 1984 (#84000728)	765 Algoma Boulevard; 44°01′31″N 88°33′04″W	Oshkosh	Spanish-Mediterranean Revival home completed in 1920 by Fluor Brothers of Oshkosh for Pollock, who headed Oshkosh Overall Co, which would become Oshkosh B'Gosh. Pollock later donated it to the Teachers College and it has served as dormitory etc, but remains well-preserved.
65	Read School	Read School	February 11, 1993 (#93000025)	1120 Algoma Boulevard; 44°01′51″N 88°33′16″W	Oshkosh	Public school built in phases, with the first High Victorian Italianate sections designed by Waters and built in 1879, 1893 and 1907, and other sections built later. George Read was Superintendent of Schools at the time.
66	Riverside Cemetery	Riverside Cemetery	June 26, 2003 (#03000578)	1901 Algoma Boulevard; 44°02′48″N 88°33′58″W	Oshkosh	Large old cemetery begun in 1855 along the Fox River, with a 1921 Richardsonian Romanesque chapel, a G.A.R. veterans plot, a Masonic section, a potter's field, and family mausoleums in various styles.
67	St. Mary's Catholic Church Complex	St. Mary's Catholic Church Complex	May 17, 2021 (#100006505)	605, 619 Merritt Ave., 442 Monroe St. 44°01′11″N 88°31′45″W	Oshkosh	High Victorian Gothic church designed by A. Duiding and built in 1886. Built grand because it was supposed to be the see for NE Wisconsin. Also the 1904 St Francis Cabrini Elementary school.
68	Security Bank	Security Bank	October 7, 1994 (#94001212)	903 Oregon St. 44°00′37″N 88°32′34″W	Oshkosh	Brick and limestone bank designed by Oshkosh architect Julius Dreger in NeoClassical style and built by C.R. Meyer and Sons in 1926-27, with a 20-foot vault from the Mosler Safe Company.
69	J. Leslie Sensenbrenner House	J. Leslie Sensenbrenner House	September 2, 2003 (#03000897)	256 N. Park Ave. 44°11′13″N 88°26′42″W	Neenah	The Cape-Cod styled core was built in 1932 by Menasha industrialist George Gaylord, then extensively remodeled and expanded by Sensenbrenner in 1941 in various period revival styles. Sensenbrenner and his father were executives at Kimberly-Clark.
70	Franklyn C. Shattuck House	Franklyn C. Shattuck House	December 4, 1978 (#78000153)	547 E. Wisconsin Ave. 44°10′51″N 88°27′02″W	Neenah	Georgian Revival home with porte cochere designed by Ferry & Clas and built 1890-93. Shattuck was a founder of Kimberly-Clark. His son Arthur was a well-known concert pianist. Daniel Brown, president of the Neenah Paper Company, later lived in the house.
71	Henry Sherry House	Henry Sherry House	December 22, 1999 (#99001607)	527 E. Wisconsin Ave. 44°11′00″N 88°27′06″W	Neenah	Home with 4-story tower and porte cochere, designed by Waters in High Victorian Gothic style with some Queen Anne decoration and built in 1883. Sherry was a lumberman with interests in northeastern and central Wisconsin. The house was later the home of Hugh Strange of the Strange Lumber Company.
72	Smith School		September 16, 2021 (#100006898)	1745 Oregon St. 44°00′00″N 88°32′33″W	Oshkosh	Brick Renaissance Revival-style school designed by William Waters and built by Meyer and Domke in 1896.
73	Charles R. Smith House	Charles R. Smith House	July 16, 1979 (#79000122)	824 E. Forest Ave. 44°11′26″N 88°26′42″W	Neenah	Rambling mansion begun by Smith in 1890 and later expanded with various pavilions and porches with Queen Anne, Italianate, and Colonial Revival features. Charles was a son of Elisha Smith, founder of Menasha Wooden Ware, and expanded, modernized, and diversified the company when he took over. For his second wife, Smith got the town of Warner renamed Ladysmith, and after Charles died, that wife married the silent movie actor Orrin Johnson, who retired to the mansion.
74	Henry Spencer Smith House	Henry Spencer Smith House	June 25, 1982 (#82000735)	706 E. Forest Ave. 44°11′27″N 88°26′47″W	Neenah	Another Smith mansion, started in 1892 and expanded by another son of Elisha Smith and executive of Menasha Wooden Ware. Included music room, conservatory, 3-story tower, and third floor ballroom. At least partly designed by Waters.
75	Hiram Smith House	Hiram Smith House	September 6, 1996 (#96000990)	336 Main St. 44°11′10″N 88°28′07″W	Neenah	2-story brick octagon house with Italianate styling and rear wing, built between 1851 and 1854. Hiram ran a dry goods business, started an early paper company with his brother in 1865, and was president of the Manufacturer's Bank.
76	Tayco Street Bridge	Tayco Street Bridge	May 30, 1986 (#86001182)	Tayco and Water Sts. 44°11′54″N 88°27′09″W	Menasha	Drawbridge across the Government Canal, specifically a Strauss Trunnion bascule bridge with Classical styling, designed by McMahon & Clark Engineering of Menasha and built 1928-29. Replaced in 1993 after partial collapse in 1989.
77	Trinity Episcopal Church	Trinity Episcopal Church	December 30, 1974 (#74000145)	203 Algoma Boulevard; 44°01′08″N 88°32′24″W	Oshkosh	Richardsonian Romanesque church designed by Waters and built 1887-89, with a large round Tiffany stained glass window portraying "The Angel of Prayer".
78	Upper Main Street Historic District	Upper Main Street Historic District	December 6, 1984 (#84000714)	163-240 Main, 3 Mill, 56 Racine, and 408 Water Sts. 44°12′04″N 88°26′51″W	Menasha	Old downtown, including the 1884 High Victorian Scott Block and Planner's Block, the 1892 Clovis Block, the 1894 Queen Anne-styled Masonic Block, the 1895 Romanesque Revival Beck's Meat Market, the 1897 Neoclassical Elisha D. Smith Library, and the 1905 Waters-designed Hotel Menasha.
79	US Post Office-Menasha	US Post Office-Menasha	August 22, 1986 (#86001518)	84 Racine St. 44°12′08″N 88°26′47″W	Menasha	Colonial Revival post office with atypical mansard roof, built in 1931.
80	Dewitt Clinton Van Ostrand House	Dewitt Clinton Van Ostrand House	January 9, 1997 (#96001575)	413 Church St. 44°11′05″N 88°27′53″W	Neenah	2-story brick Italianate house started between 1855 and 1861. Van Ostrand was a pioneer businessman, involved in rocking chair manufacture, shipping, retail dry goods, flour milling, paper manufacture, stove manufacture, and banking. In the late 1860s, Van Ostrand's and Hiram Smith's Neenah Paper Company was one of the first to show the Fox Valley's potential for making paper.
81	Gorham P. Vining House	Gorham P. Vining House	December 8, 1983 (#83004366)	1590 Oakridge Rd. 44°11′06″N 88°29′57″W	Neenah	Well-preserved Greek Revival home with summer kitchen, built in 1848. Vining from Massachusetts, was an early settler of the Neenah area.
82	Waite Grass Carpet Company	Waite Grass Carpet Company	February 21, 2018 (#100002141)	300 E Custer & 221 E Nevada Aves. 44°02′05″N 88°32′03″W	Oshkosh	Two 2-story factory buildings built in 1910, which housed an enterprise that made rugs and carpets with the wire grass that was native to the marshes west and south of Oshkosh. Operated for 50 years.
83	Thomas R. Wall Residence	Thomas R. Wall Residence	December 6, 1984 (#84000732)	751 Algoma Boulevard; 44°01′30″N 88°33′02″W	Oshkosh	1898 home designed by Waters in a blend of Queen Anne and Colonial Revival styles for Wall, a businessman with interests in lumber, steamships, and banking. Later owned by Morgan Davies of Morgan Sash and Door, then John Bartlett of Oshkosh Trunk, then UW-Oshkosh.
84	Washington Avenue Historic District	Washington Avenue Historic District	May 22, 1986 (#86001129)	Roughly bounded by Merritt Ave., Linde and Lampert Sts., Washington Ave., and Bowen and Evan Sts. 44°01′06″N 88°31′20″W	Oshkosh	Large, mainly residential district on the east side, including the 1870 Italianate Weisbrod house, the 1885 Queen Anne Roenitz house, the 1897 Queen Anne Buckstaff house pictured at left, the 1903 Georgian Revival Oshkosh Yacht Club, the 1904 Colonial Revival Schmidt house, the 1911 Schwalm bungalow, the 1927 English Cottage-style Meusel house, and the 1929 Tudor Revival Stephenson house.
85	Washington Avenue Neoclassical Historic District	Washington Avenue Neoclassical Historic District	April 10, 2017 (#100000863)	Roughly the 100 and 200 blocks of Washington Avenue; 44°01′04″N 88°32′06″W	Oshkosh	A cluster of six stately Neoclassical-styled buildings: the 1900 Oshkosh Public Library, the 1914 Fraternal Reserve Association, the 1924 Goettman Printing Company, the 1925 Oshkosh Masonic Temple, the 1929 U.S. Post Office, and the 1925 Wisconsin National Life Insurance Building.
86	Washington Street Historic District	Washington Street Historic District	May 30, 1986 (#86001180)	214-216 Washington St. 44°11′43″N 88°27′15″W	Menasha	Consists of the 1930 Northwest Electrotype & Engraving Office & Plant (pictured) and the 1935 Verbrick's Gas Station. Both are in Tudor Revival style, part of an effort by Menasha Wooden Ware Corp. to redevelop its stave yards on Doty Island into an "English-styled" commercial district.
87	S.H. Waterman House	S.H. Waterman House	February 25, 1993 (#93000068)	1141 Algoma Boulevard; 44°01′52″N 88°33′21″W	Oshkosh	Large Queen Anne house with Eastlake ornamentation (e.g. delicate, turned spindle-work) built in 1889, with 2-story carriage house. Waterman was a lumberman.
88	Frank Whiting Boathouse	Frank Whiting Boathouse	April 20, 2011 (#11000204)	98 5th St. 44°11′08″N 88°26′59″W	Neenah	Spanish Revival-styled boathouse with rooftop dancing pavilion, where Whiting hosted yachting and tennis parties. Designed by Richard Messmer and built in 1932. Donated to the city after Whiting's death.
89	Frank B. Whiting House	Frank B. Whiting House	May 31, 2000 (#00000523)	620 E. Forest Ave. 44°11′34″N 88°26′53″W	Neenah	Queen Anne-style home built in 1885 for David Barnes, with 2-story carriage house. Whiting remodeled the house and installed a secret liquor vault during Prohibition. He led the Wisconsin River operations of his father's Whiting Paper Co. and promoted air travel in the Fox Valley.
90	William C. Wing House	William C. Wing House	May 6, 1993 (#93000400)	143 N. Park Ave. 44°10′52″N 88°26′44″W	Neenah	2-story French Renaissance-styled house overlooking Lake Winnebago, designed by Childs & Smith and built in 1918 for George Gaylord of the Menasha Carton Company and Menasha Paper Company. Later bought by William Wing of the Fox River Paper Company.
91	Winnebago County Courthouse	Winnebago County Courthouse	June 23, 1982 (#82000736)	415 Jackson St. 44°01′17″N 88°32′35″W	Oshkosh	5-story Moderne-styled courthouse designed by Frank Venning of Granger & Bollenbacher of Chicago.
92	Wisconsin Avenue Historic District	Wisconsin Avenue Historic District	June 14, 1984 (#84003827)	106-226 W. Wisconsin Ave. and 110 Church St. 44°11′14″N 88°27′47″W	Neenah	The old commercial heart of Neenah, including the 1858 Wheeler & Leavens Block, a.k.a. Sorenson & Son Furniture, the 1866 Jandrey dry good store, the 1883 Queen Anne-styled Sherry's Post Office Block, the 1894 Romanesque-styled Winnebago Paper Company Office, and the 1934 Art Deco Northwestern Distributing Company Store and Manufactury.
93	Wisconsin National Life Insurance Building	Wisconsin National Life Insurance Building	April 29, 1982 (#82000737)	220 Washington Ave. 44°01′04″N 88°32′03″W	Oshkosh	Neoclassical office building with four colossal columns in front, decorated with relief sculpture. Designed by Auler and Jensen and built in 1927. Used by Winnebago County in 2008.

== Former listings ==
	Name on the Register	Image	Date listed	Date removed	Location	City or town	Description
1	Amos House		June 1, 1982 (#82000730)	August 17, 1989	1157 High Ave.	Oshkosh	Greek Revival home with a full one-story porch, built in 1866. Frank Amos was a teamster and partner in lumber companies.
2	Brin Building	Brin Building	July 10, 1986 (#86001541)	December 18, 2024	1 Main St. 44°11′57″N 88°27′10″W	Menasha	Brick commercial building designed by local architect H. D. Werwath in Mediterranean Revival style and built in 1928. It included a 932-seat movie theater, stores, a 12-lane bowling alley in the basement, and apartments upstairs.
3	Buckstaff Observatory	Buckstaff Observatory	May 17, 1979 (#79000119)	November 2, 2012	2119 N. Main St. 44°02′38″N 88°32′18″W	Oshkosh	Private observatory built around 1924 by amateur astronomer Ralph Buckstaff of Buckstaff Furniture, from which he studied sunspots, discovered the variable star Yi 1256, and took observations for the US Weather Service for over 50 years. Dismantled and moved in 2011.
4	Menasha City Hall	Menasha City Hall	March 15, 1984 (#84003826)	February 17, 1989	124 Main St.	Menasha	Late Victorian Gothic public building designed by Charles Hove and built in 1885. Initially housed city offices, fire department, jail and council chambers. Demolished in 1988.

== See also ==
- List of National Historic Landmarks in Wisconsin
- National Register of Historic Places listings in Wisconsin
- Listings in neighboring counties: Calumet, Fond du Lac, Green Lake, Outagamie, Waupaca, Waushara
