= Wisconsin Avenue Historic District =

Wisconsin Avenue Historic District may refer to:

- Wisconsin Avenue Historic District (Neenah, Wisconsin), listed on the National Register of Historic Places in Winnebago County, Wisconsin
- Wisconsin Avenue Historic District (Waukesha, Wisconsin), listed on the National Register of Historic Places in Waukesha County, Wisconsin
