= Vulcan Street Plant =

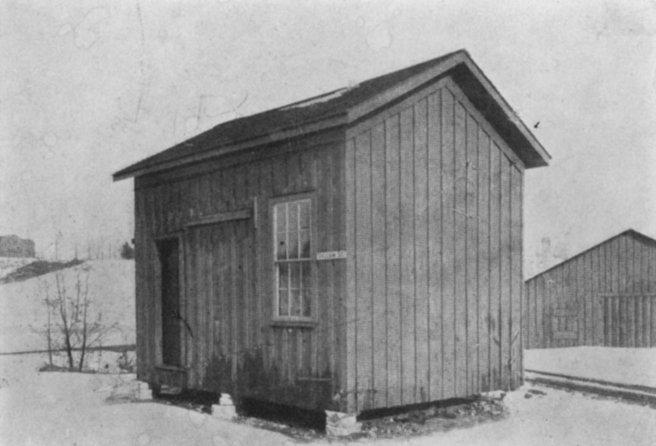

- Location within Wisconsin
- Official name: Vulcan Street Plant
- Location: Appleton, Outagamie County, Wisconsin, U.S.
- Coordinates: 44°15′12″N 88°24′42″W

Dam and spillways
- Impounds: Fox River

Power Station
- Commission date: September 30, 1882
- Turbines: 1
- Installed capacity: 12.5 kW

The Vulcan Street Plant was the first Edison hydroelectric central station. The plant was built on the Fox River in Appleton, Wisconsin, and put into operation on September 30, 1882. According to the American Society of Mechanical Engineers, the Vulcan Street plant is considered to be "the first hydro-electric central station to serve a system of private and commercial customers in North America". It is a National Historic Mechanical Engineering Landmark, an IEEE milestone and a National Historic Civil Engineering Landmark.

The Vulcan Street Plant was housed in the Appleton Paper and Pulp Company building, which burned to the ground in 1891. A replica of the Vulcan Street Plant was later built on South Oneida Street.

== Origin ==
The Vulcan Street Plant was conceptualized by H. J. Rogers – who was the president of the Appleton Paper and Pulp Co. and of the Appleton Gas Light Co. during this time. According to the Institute of Electrical and Electronics Engineering, H. J. Rogers first came up with the idea for a hydro-electric central station after talking with a friend of his, H. E. Jacobs, while they were on a fishing trip.

=== The Appleton Edison Electric Light Company ===
H. E. Jacobs, who was working for Western Edison Light Company of Chicago as a licensing agent, informed H. J. Rogers about Thomas Edison’s plan for a steam-driven electric power plant in New York City called the Pearl Street Plant. Upon learning about Edison’s advances in electric light technology and electric generators, Rogers worked to bring together a group of investors to create one of the first hydro-electric central stations in the world. For this reason, the Appleton Edison Electric Light Company was formed and incorporated on May 25, 1882.

While Edison’s Pearl Street Plant was still under construction, the founders of the Appleton Edison Electric Light Company – H. E. Jacobs, A. L. Smith, H. D. Smith, and Charles Beveridge – began planning the Vulcan Street Plant.

In July 1882, engineer P. D. Johnston, who worked for Western Edison Light Company of Chicago during this time, visited Appleton to explain the details of Edison’s lighting system to the founders of the Appleton Edison Electric Light Company. After this meeting, the founders decided to test the viability of hydro-electric lighting by first installing it in their homes and mills.

As a result, two Edison "K" type generators were ordered. The first generator was installed in H. J. Roger’s paper mill, the Appleton Paper and Pulp Company, and is the generator that began operation on September 30, 1882. The second generator was installed in its building on Vulcan Street and began operation on November 25, 1882.

=== Problems and successes ===
On September 27, 1882, the first generator began operation, but without success. Hence, Edward T. Ames, the installer, returned to Appleton to correct the problem.

After a few days of troubleshooting, the generator was repaired and successfully entered operation on September 30, 1882. This was only 26 days after Thomas Edison began to successfully operate his steam-driven Pearl Street Plant in New York, which began operation on September 4, 1882. The output of the original generator was about 12.5 kilowatts.

The first buildings to be lit by the Vulcan Street Plant were H.J. Rogers' home, the Appleton Paper and Pulp Company building, and the Vulcan Paper Mill, which were all connected directly to the generator.

Initially, the buildings' direct connection to the generator caused many problems because the generator was directly connected to the waterwheel. The water from the Fox River did not flow at a constant rate, so the lights did not maintain constant brightness and often burned out.

This problem was resolved by moving the generator to a lean-to off the main building, where it was attached to a separate water wheel that allowed for a more even load distribution.

During the time of the Vulcan Street Plant, voltage regulators did not exist. Operators had to look at the light itself to determine if it was at the proper brightness, and they adjusted the voltage according to their observations. Electricity meters did not exist at that time, so customers were charged a flat monthly fee based on the number of electric lamps installed in their building. Hence, many people left their lights on all night.

The original electric distribution lines in Appleton were made of bare copper. This posed many challenges in the early development of commercial electricity, because nearly everything was made of wood or other flammable materials. The wiring used in buildings was insulated by a thin layer of cotton and was fastened to walls using wood cleats. Likewise, wood was used for fuse boxes, light sockets, and switch handles.

== Appleton's first electrically lit buildings ==
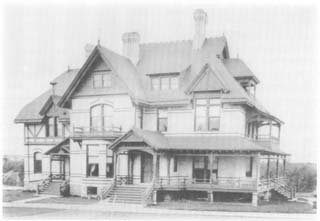
H. J. Rogers' home in Appleton, Wisconsin, now known as the Hearthstone Historic House Museum, one of the few surviving examples of the wiring and lighting fixtures from the dawn of the electrical age

H. J. Rogers' home, which has been converted to be the Hearthstone Historic House Museum, is one of the few surviving examples of wiring and lighting fixtures from the dawn of the electrical age. and the Appleton Paper and Pulp Company building burned to the ground in 1891, and the Vulcan Paper Mill was dismantled in 1908.

After the Vulcan Street Plant was destroyed by fire, an exact replica was built on South Oneida Street and was opened to the public on September 30, 1932. According to the minutes taken at the Appleton Historic Preservation Committee meeting on October 21, 2008, the replica of the Vulcan Street Plant was, "... painstakingly constructed duplicating all of the building's original features."

This site was dedicated as an ASME National Historic Engineering Landmark, jointly designated with ASCE and IEEE on September 15, 1977.

== See also ==
- War of the currents
- Samuel Insull
