= Thomas R. Wall Residence =

- U.S. National Register of Historic Places
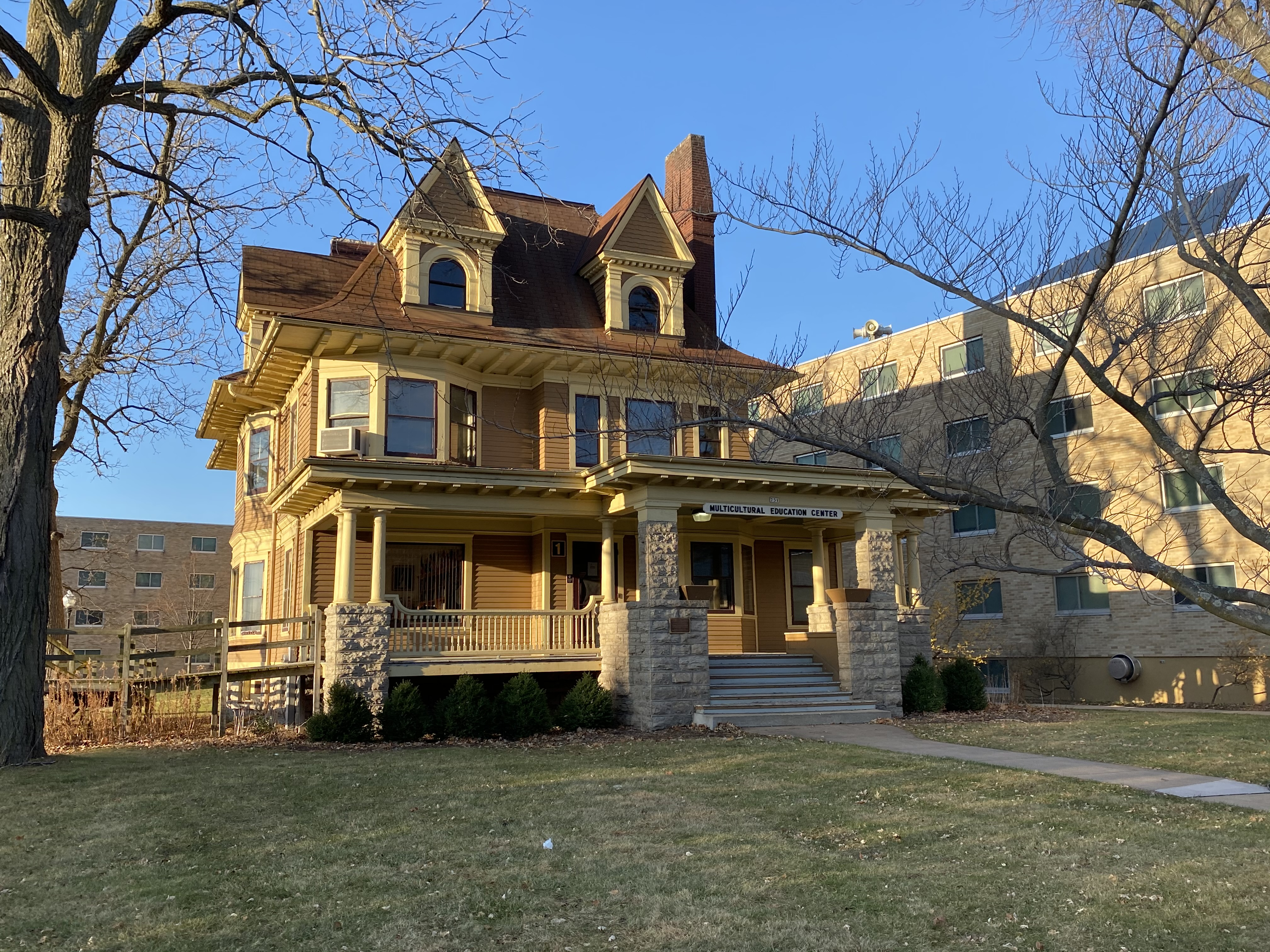
- Front entrance to the house

- Location within Wisconsin Location within the United States
- Location: 751 Algoma Blvd., Oshkosh, Wisconsin
- Coordinates: 44.0249839°N 88.5503913°W
- Area: less than one acre
- Built: 1898-1900
- Architect: William Waters
- Architectural style: Colonial Revival
- NRHP reference No.: 84000732
- Added to NRHP: November 7, 1984

The Thomas R. Wall Residence is a Colonial Revival style house in Oshkosh, Wisconsin. It was added to the National Register of Historic Places on November 7, 1984.

The house is located on the University of Wisconsin-Oshkosh campus. The university owns the house and property.

== History ==
The Thomas R. Wall Residence was built between 1898 and 1900 by the prominent local architect William Waters. In 1855, Thomas Wall's father came to Oshkosh and joined other industrialists in establishing the local lumber industry. Upon his death in 1896, the oldest of Wall's sons, Thomas and James took over the family businesses. It was around this time that the house was built. Wall, who by 1928 had held positions as president of the Commercial National Bank of Oshkosh, and board member of multiple lumber companies left the house. He eventually sold to his son-in-law, Oshkosh businessman Morgan Davies. Wall had moved from the city to a country home in Windemere, on Lake Winnebago, where he died later in 1928. Davies, who was closely associated with the Morgan Co., a sash and door factory in the city, lived in the house until 1930–31. The house was again sold, to John H. Bartlett, Jr. of the Oshkosh Trunk Co. In 1947 the residence was purchased by the university and used in various functions. It is currently used as the Multi-Cultural Education Center, which it has done so since 1972. The house began to deteriorate, and by the 1990s, the university planned to demolish it due to “termite infestation and bad drinking water”. Chancellor Dr. Richard Wells decided against those plans and a committee was formed to save the residence. The committee eventually secured the funds to update the residence as well as make it compliant with the Americans with Disabilities Act. The Thomas R. Wall Residence remains as one of the few examples of architecture from the early lumber mill period in Oshkosh. It now stands alone amongst the many modern buildings constructed for the university, including in the shadow of the Taylor Residence Hall. The current capacity of the residence allows for free entry and use by university students, staff, and the community.

== See also ==
- Oviatt House
- William E. Pollock Residence
- Oshkosh State Normal School Historic District
