= Danes Hall =

- U.S. National Register of Historic Places
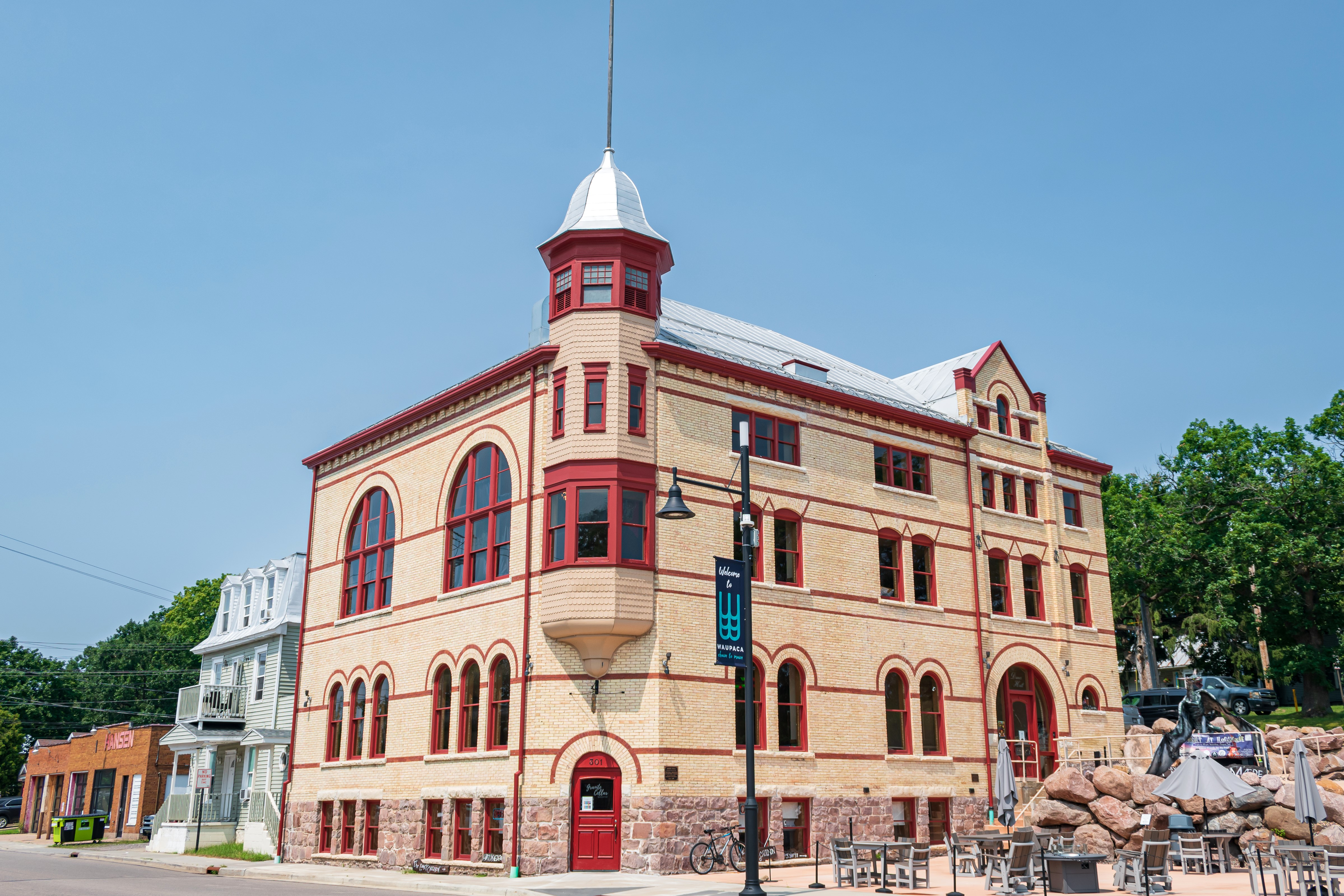
- Danes Hall in 2024

- Location within Wisconsin Location within the United States
- Location: 303 N. Main St., Waupaca, Wisconsin
- Coordinates: 44°21′36″N 89°5′4″W
- Area: 0.1 acres (0.040 ha)
- Built: 1894
- Architect: Waters, William
- Architectural style: Romanesque
- NRHP reference No.: 80000209
- Added to NRHP: January 17, 1980

The Danes Hall in Waupaca, Wisconsin, United States, was built in 1894 as a gathering place for the Danes Home Society. It served historically as a clubhouse, as a meeting hall, and as an auditorium. The upper floor consists of a dance hall with a balcony. It was listed on the National Register of Historic Places in 1980.

== History ==
The Danes Hall was organized by eleven members of the Danish club on January 6, 1877. The group grew to a maximum membership of 300 members before dwindling to 32 by 1940. The building was designed by William Waters. The building contained a library with over 1000 books. In the winter of 1876-1877, the Wisconsin Central Railroad had just been completed to Ashland Wisconsin and many of the men who had worked on the line were idle. Combined with the young men idled by the lack of work on the local farms, there was an enormous number of men who had no place to go for an evening of companionship and amusement, except at the local saloons. A group of members of the Waupaca community got together to see what could be done to provide these men with a more suitable environment to gather.

Lars Larson, William Bendixen and Nels Larson from Waupaca and A.P. Larson from Farmington township circulated a pledge and a petition. When 12 people had signed the pledge a room was rented in the wooden building owned by O.O. Olson. The first meeting was held On January 6, 1877. Each signer paid a fee of 50 cents and The Danes Home was born. A short time later this building was destroyed by fire. The Danes Home (De Danske Hjem) was the first lodge to organize for social and literary purposes. In 1882 it incorporated under the laws of Wisconsin.

The constitution and bylaws were adopted and the name "The Danes Home" was formally adopted. The bylaws provided that all males born to Danish parents, 18 years of age, or older, who were able to read and speak the Danish language, would be eligible for membership. Gambling and intoxicating beverages were strictly forbidden on the premises. After some years The Danes Home Society had their own insurance for the benefit of the sick and incapacitated. The charter members were Hans Yorkson, president; A. Rasmussen, vice president; George Nelson, librarian; Jens Peterson, JohnGeorgeson, George Hennegsen, N. Larson, A.P. Anderson and Jens Rasmussen.

The newly organized Danes Home rented three more different locations before they made the purchase of a building of their own in 1882. The second location was upstairs in the F. Peterson building: the third location was over the post office in the Chady building on east Union Street south of the Courthouse Square. While located here, the building burned. The next location was over Matt Jensen's market on North Main Street. where the society remained until November 14, 1882 when they purchased the old courthouse that was being moved off of Courthouse Square to make room for a new courthouse building.

The old courthouse was purchased for $275, and now the Danes Home Society had a building to be moved to property that had previously been purchased for $600. With the cost of moving the building the total cost for their new home was $1,300. Within 5 years the debt had been discharged and there was money in the treasury, and 560 books in their library. This wooden building served the Society's needs until 1894 when they sold the building and moved it to the west end of the Water Street bridge where it stood until being demolished in 1965.

The current Danes Home (Danes Hall) that stands on the corner of Main and Granite Streets was erected in 1894. It was designed by the architect William Waters of Oshkosh, who was a highly respected architect of his time. The plans were drafted by Peter Jensen of Oshkosh who was a former resident of Waupaca. Construction of this three story brick building began in August 1894 and the building was completed on November 22, 1894. The total cost of the new building was $7,000.

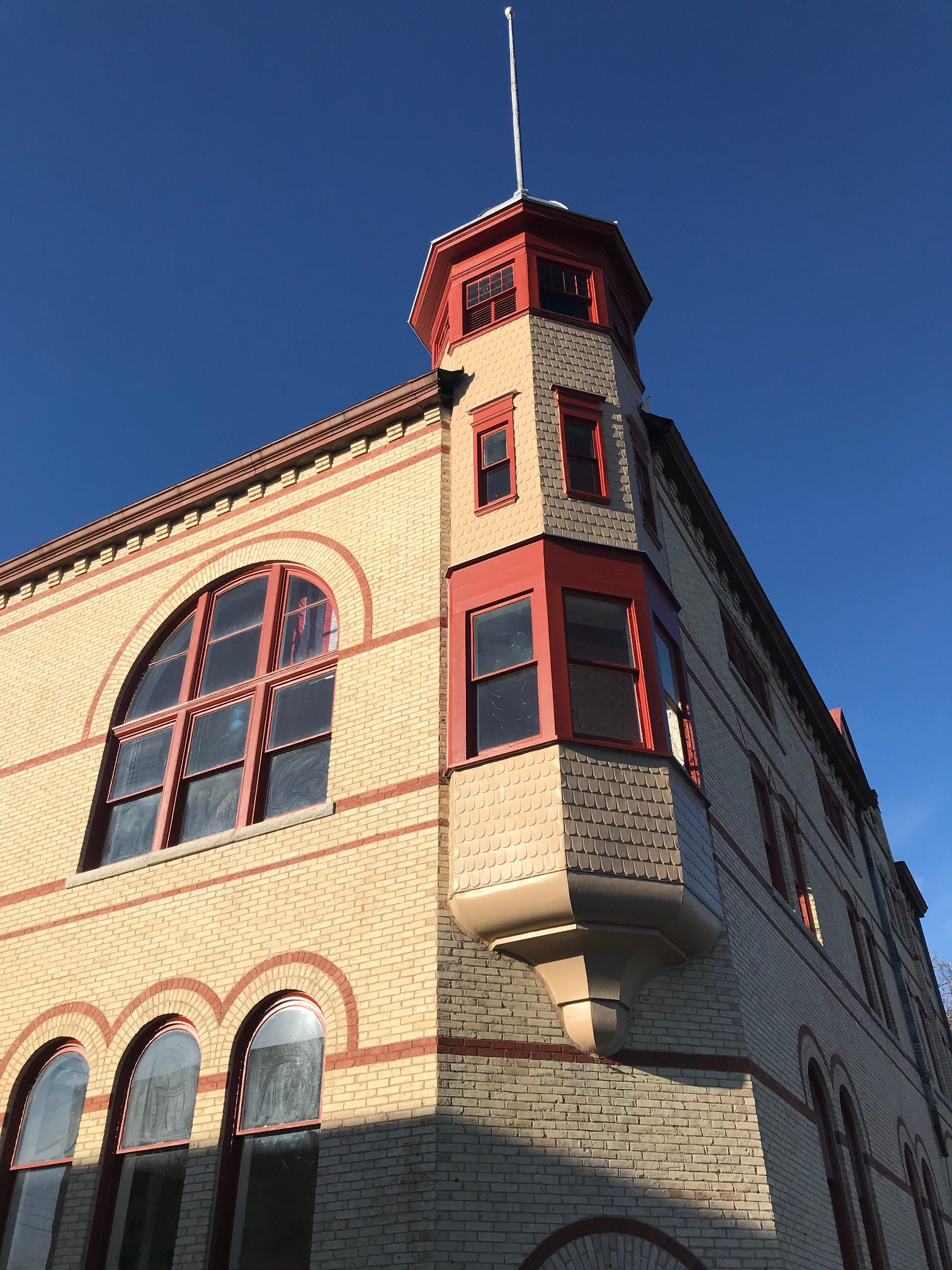
Danes Hall turret

The Dedication ceremonies took place on November 29, 1894 with about 400 people in attendance. The Waupaca Republican newspaper stated that the building was brilliantly illuminated with electric lights and profusely decorated with festoons of evergreens, flowers, and flags. The newspaper also stated that all who attended enjoyed the exercise, the dance, the music, the social, and the supper. From the description in the Waupaca republican on December 7, 1894, the main entrance from the sidewalk opened through three doors to a vestibule, where there were two doors which led to the assembly hall, ladies parlor, smoking room, cloak room, and ticket office. At the rear there was a wide stairway leading to the dance hall and lecture room. This was a fine dance hall where 15 to 20 couples could dance with ease. In the case of a lecture or other entertainment there was room for 300 chairs and 200 more could be placed in the gallery above, which occupies three sides of the room. At the time of the dedication, and for many years after, the Danes Home was the largest meeting facility in Waupaca. The ballroom was used by the Waupaca National Guard for practicing drills and Waupaca High School used the ballroom for many of their graduation exercises.

Throughout the 1930s and early 1940s the Danes Home Society saw a declining membership with the end result being reported in The Waupaca County Post on March 8, 1945; "Danes Home, a Waupaca landmark for 50 years is sold." The paper continued "One of Waupaca's old landmarks changed ownership last week when the D.A. Hall, opposite the city hall was sold to Henry Bille, local tinsmith. The building had been in the possession of the Danes Home Society for the past 50 years."

In June 1975 Mr. Bille sold the former Danes Home building to the law firm of Johnson, Hansen, and Shambeau, but continued to operate his business from this location until April 1977. At that time, Mr. Bille moved his business to King. The building was sold once again and the new owners proceeded in a restoration of the building and on January 17, 1980 it was officially registered on The National Register of Historic Places. Shortly after this, the building saw use as a successful "antique mall". Several antique dealers sold their merchandise on consignment through the building owners. The ballroom was partitioned off into display areas for the various antique vendors. The main floor and the lower level were also divided for display use. The Danes Home Antiques business operated for several years and then closed in 2015 and moved out.

The current owners, Danes Hall L.L.C., purchased the vacant building in August 2016 with the intention of restoring it to its former grandeur as a community landmark and social hall

== See also ==
- List of Danish Brotherhood in America buildings
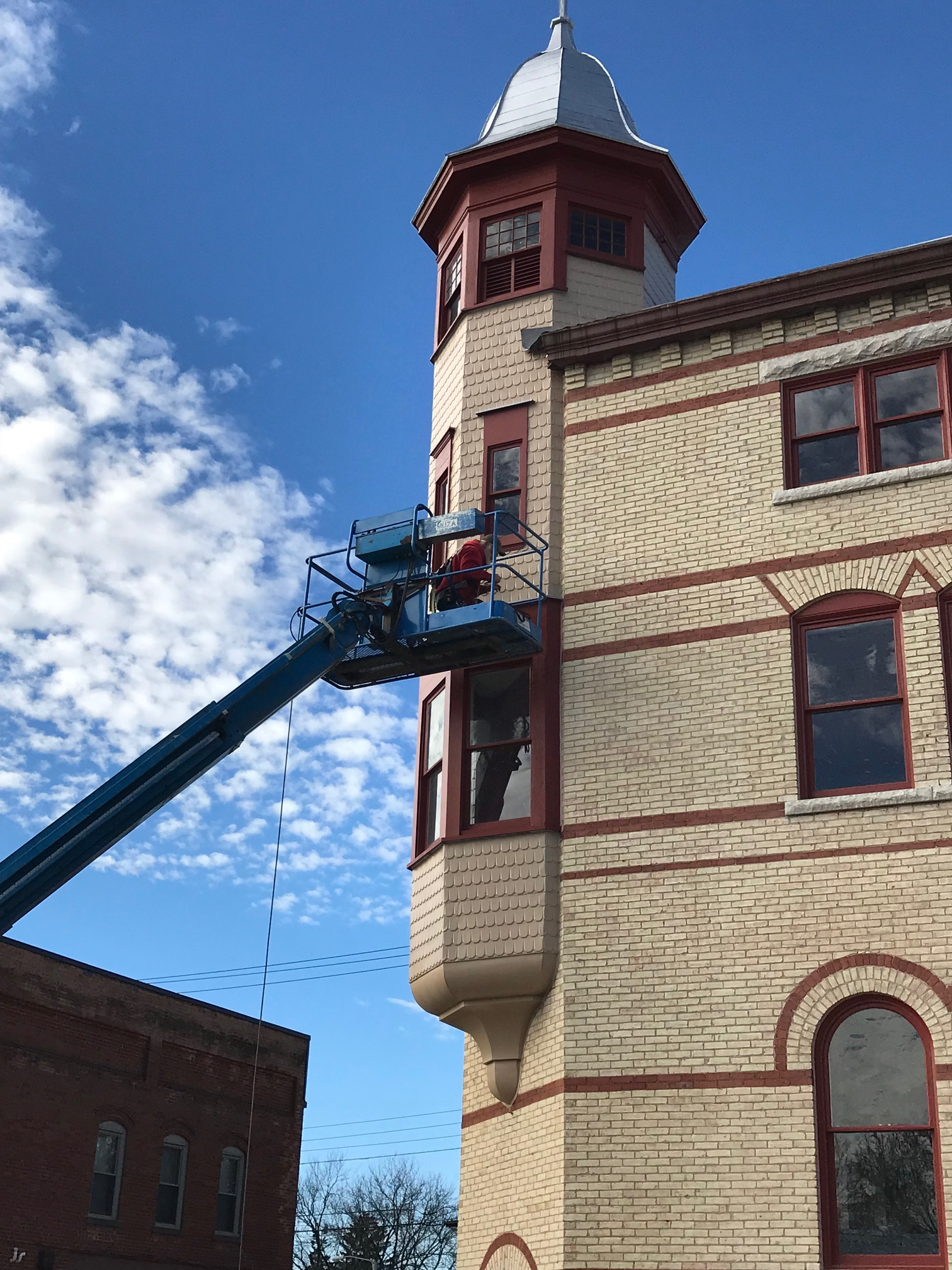
Danes Hall in Waupaca undergoing renovation

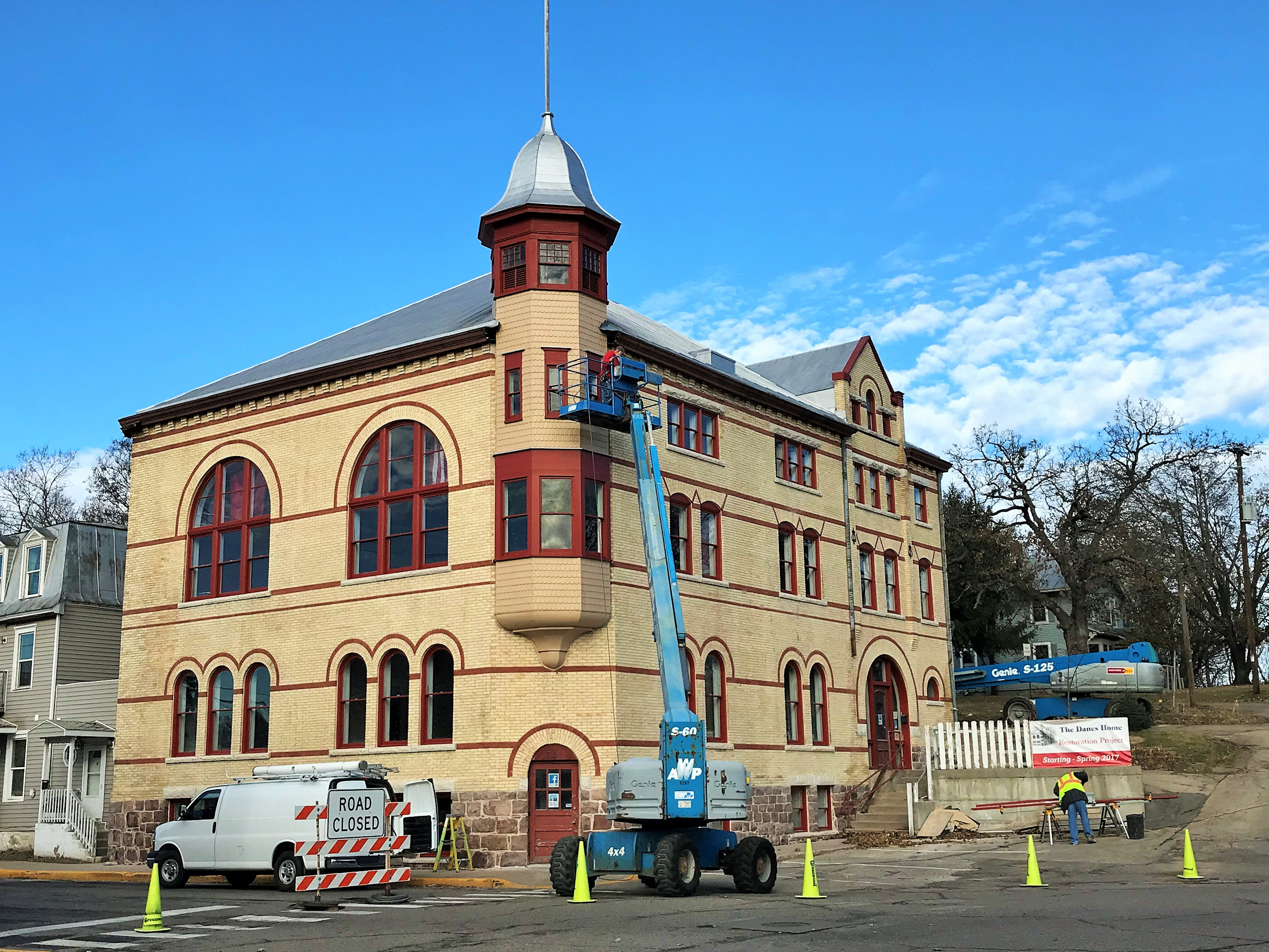
Danes Hall renovations continue.
