= Green Lake County Courthouse =

- U.S. National Register of Historic Places
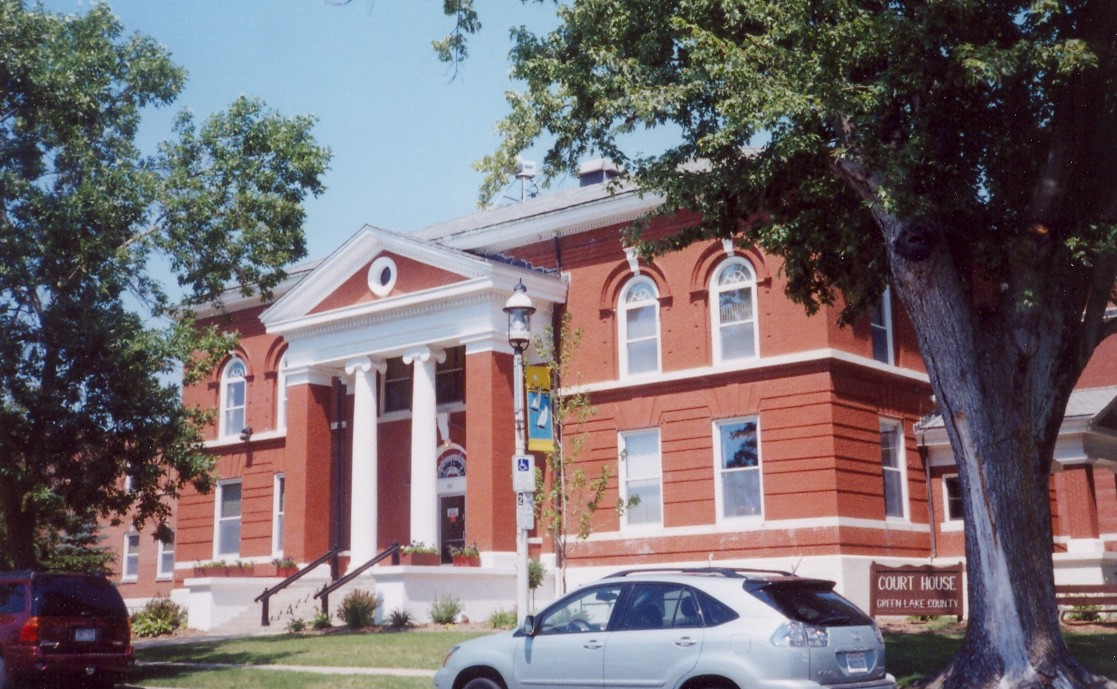
- Green Lake County Courthouse

- Location within Wisconsin Location within the United States
- Interactive map showing the location for Green Lake County Courthouse
- Location: 492 Hill Street, Green Lake, Wisconsin
- Coordinates: 43°50′43.5″N 88°57′39″W
- Area: 1.5 acres (0.61 ha)
- Built: 1899
- Architect: William Waters
- Architectural style: Neoclassical
- MPS: County Courthouses of Wisconsin TR
- NRHP reference No.: 82000672
- Added to NRHP: March 9, 1982

The Green Lake County Courthouse in Green Lake, Wisconsin, United States, is the former seat of government for Green Lake County. The county government relocated to a new facility in 2011, and the following year the former courthouse underwent adaptive reuse as the Town Square Community Center. The courthouse was built in 1899 at a cost of $25,000. Among its features is a pedimented portico. It was listed on the National Register of Historic Places in 1982 and the State Register of Historic Places in 1989.
