= Hearthstone Historic House Museum =

Historic house in Wisconsin, United States

Coordinates: 44.254309°N 88.415191°W

- Hearthstone
- U.S. National Register of Historic Places
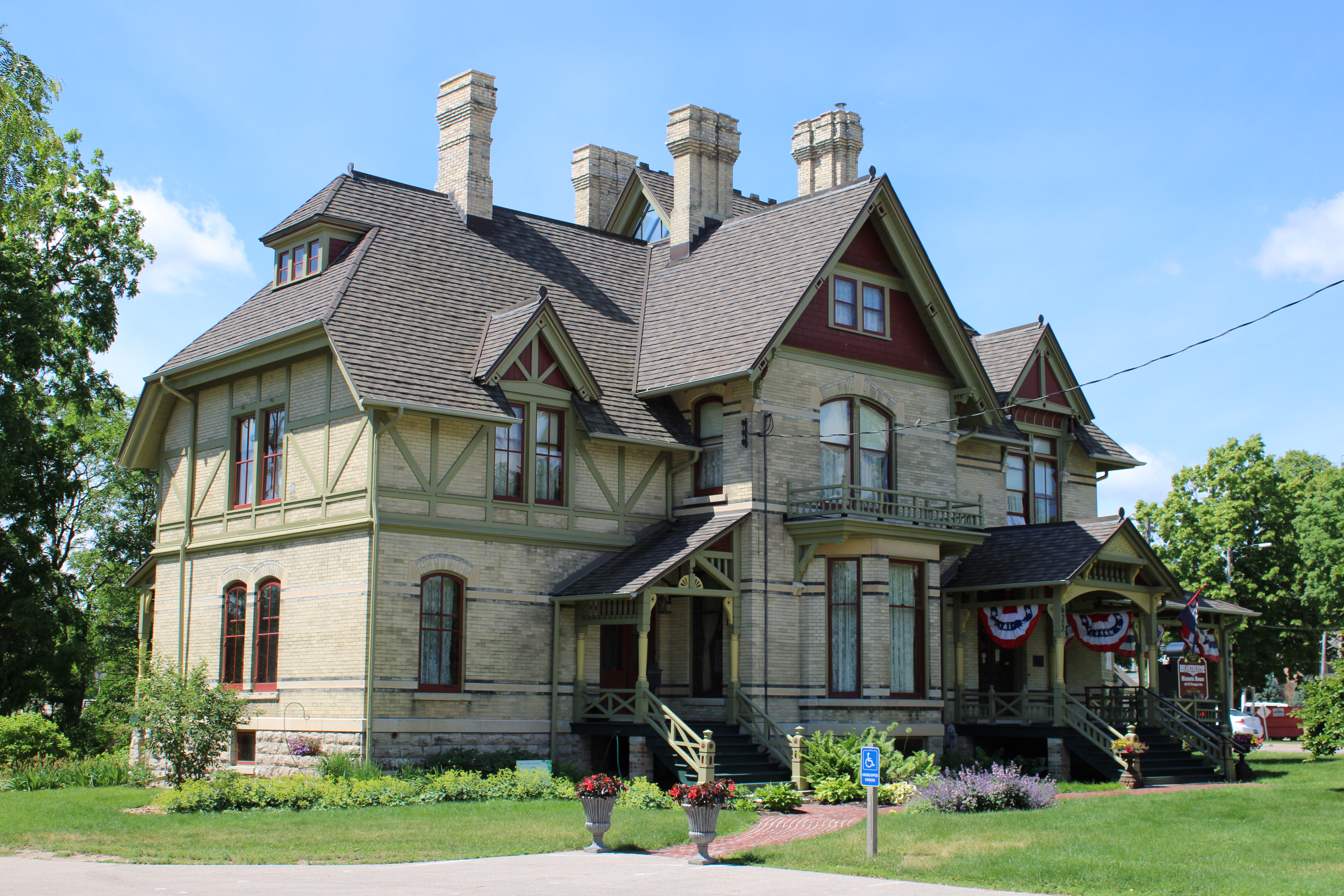

- Location within Wisconsin Location within the United States
- Interactive map showing the location of Hearthstone Historic House Museum
- Location: 625 W. Prospect Ave., Appleton, Outagamie County, Wisconsin, USA
- Area: less than one acre
- Built: 1882
- Architect: William Waters, Henry VanStrom
- Architectural style: Queen Anne
- NRHP reference No.: 74000112
- Added to NRHP: December 2, 1974

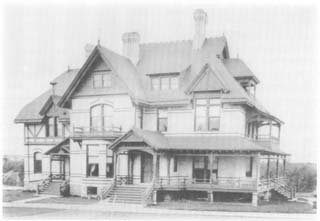
Hearthstone in 1887

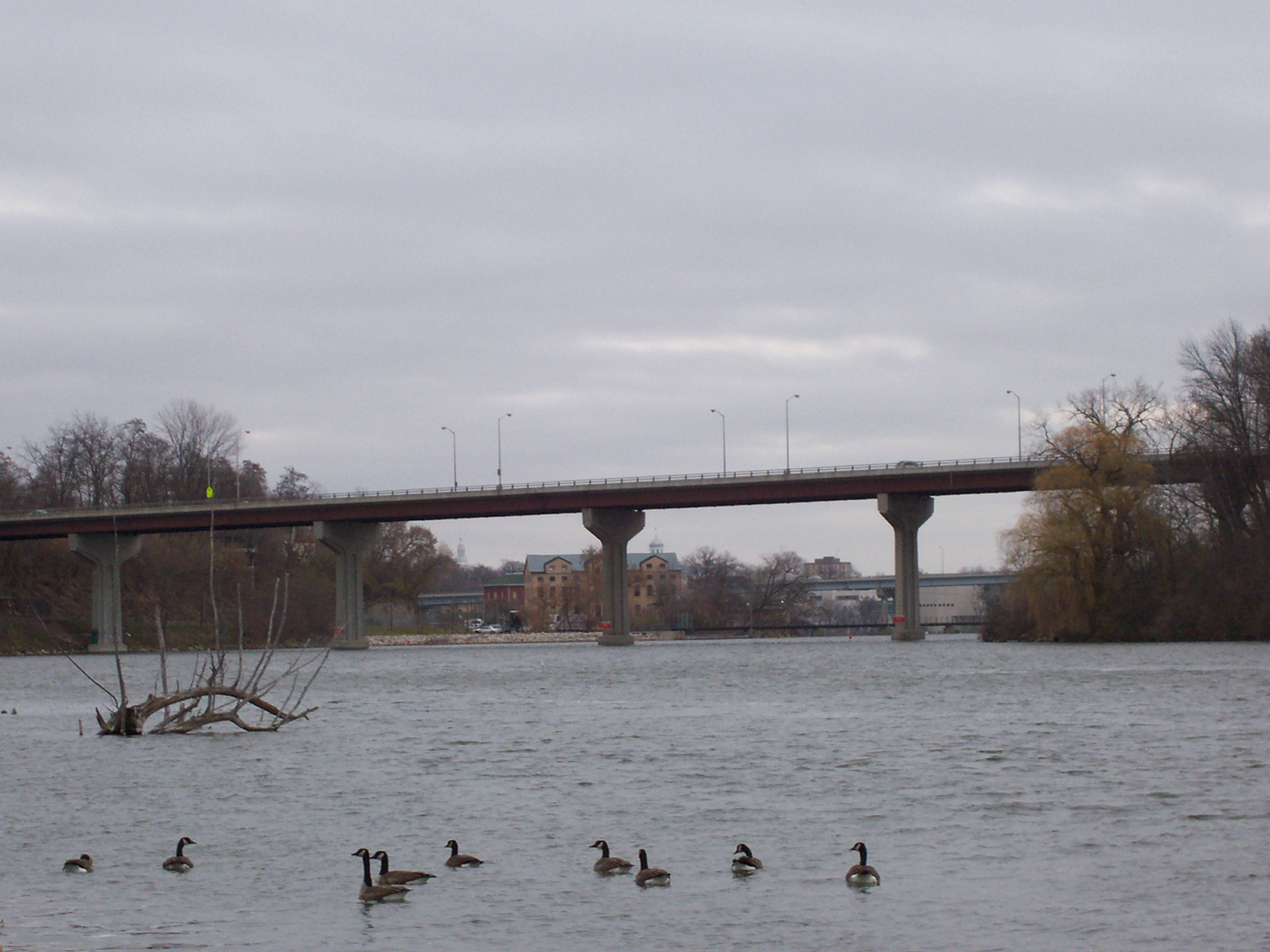
The Memorial bridge over the Fox River on Wisconsin Highway 47. The house is located just north (left) of the bridge.

The Hearthstone Historic House Museum is a historic home in Appleton, Wisconsin, United States that has been converted into a museum. On September 30, 1882, it became the first residence in the US powered by a centrally located hydroelectric station using the Edison system. At that time, the house was the residence of Henry James Rogers, a paper company executive and entrepreneur. It was listed on the National Register of Historic Places on December 2, 1974. The house was previously known as the Henry J. Rogers House.

== Location ==
The house is located at 625 W. Prospect Avenue in Appleton, Wisconsin, at the intersection of Prospect Avenue and Memorial Drive (Hwy 47) . It is situated on a bluff above the Fox River.

== House ownership ==
=== Rogers ===
Henry James Rogers built the house as a showplace for his wife, Cremora. The house was designed by Wisconsin architect William Waters, who was also the architect for the Grand Opera House and Public Library in Oshkosh and numerous businesses and residences in the area. It was first lit with hydroelectricity on September 30, 1882. The Appleton Crescent, the local newspaper, proclaimed that the electricity in the home "Was bright as day." The Rogers family lived in the house until 1893, when they moved to Chicago.

=== Later owners and tenants ===
Various tenants occupied the house, until A. W. Priest bought it in 1900. Priest died in 1930, and because his estate was unable to sell the house, it was rented and turned into a restaurant called Hearthstone Tea Room by John Carter Badenoch in 1931. Frank Harriman rented the restaurant from 1933 to 1938, when the restaurant closed. The house was sold to Frederick H. Hoffman in 1940.

The Mares family owned the home from the 1960s to 1986. The house was then purchased by the Friends of Hearthstone Inc. in 1986, opening as a museum in 1988. Friends of Hearthstone continues to run the museum.

== Electric source ==
Henry James Rogers, original owner of the house, was the manager of the Appleton Pulp and Paper Mill. The house's source of electricity was the Appleton Edison Light Company, the first commercial electric plant in America, which was put into operation two weeks after a much larger steam central power station in New York City, known as the Pearl Street Station. The house and two paper mills were powered by a dynamo located inside one of the mills. Distribution wires were bare copper, with light amounts of cotton used to insulate it. Wires were fastened to the walls with wood cleats. Tape was wound around wires where they passed through partitions. Fuse blocks were made of wood, as were the sockets and switch handles. Examples of this equipment still operate in the home.

There were no voltage regulators, so operators regulated the voltage with their eyes. Lights went bright and dim, depending on power usage at the mills. Several weeks after the power station was built, service for customers was moved to a separate wheel in a lean-to shed attached to the mill so the electricity would not be affected by the mill's operation. Storms and fallen branches frequently caused short circuits. The power plant was shut down until the problem was discovered and corrected. Residential service was from dusk to dawn.

Rogers wrote the Western Edison Light Company on November 11, 1882, and said: "Gentlemen, I have used 50 lamps in my residence and have used them about 60 days. I am pleased with them beyond expression and do not see how they can be improved upon. No heat no smoke no vitiated air and the light steady and pleasant in every way and more economical than gas and quite as reliable."

The electric lamps were described by the two local newspapers:

The electric lamp consists of a pear-shaped glass, exhausted of air, into which is sealed a filament of carbonized bamboo, slightly thicker than horse hair. This filament, becoming incandescent by the passage of the current of electricity through it, emits a beautiful soft white light, absolutely steady and constant and equaling in intensity, or exceeding if desired, the illuminating power of a gas jet of the best quality. --The Appleton Post October 5, 1882

These bulbs are connected with the wire and the current may be turned on and off as readily as a gas burner. Each lamp will burn 600 hours, and can be renewed easily, but at some considerable expense, of course. The price for the same amount of light as that of gas will be substantially the same. The electric light may entirely supersede the use of gas as an illuminator in our city, but that remains to be seen hereafter. --Appleton Crescent October 7, 1882

== Museum ==
The house is open for tours and there is a Christmas holiday display from November through January.

The house still uses its original Thomas Edison light fixtures and period electroliers. The house features the "Hydro Adventure Center", a hands-on operating model of the earliest central hydroelectric station.

The house contains nine fireplaces, some surrounded by imported Minton tiles, intricate interior handcarved woodwork carved from woods native to Wisconsin, period furnishings, secret passages, and stained glass windows.
