= Ellis Jennings House =

Historic house in Wisconsin, United States

- U.S. National Register of Historic Places
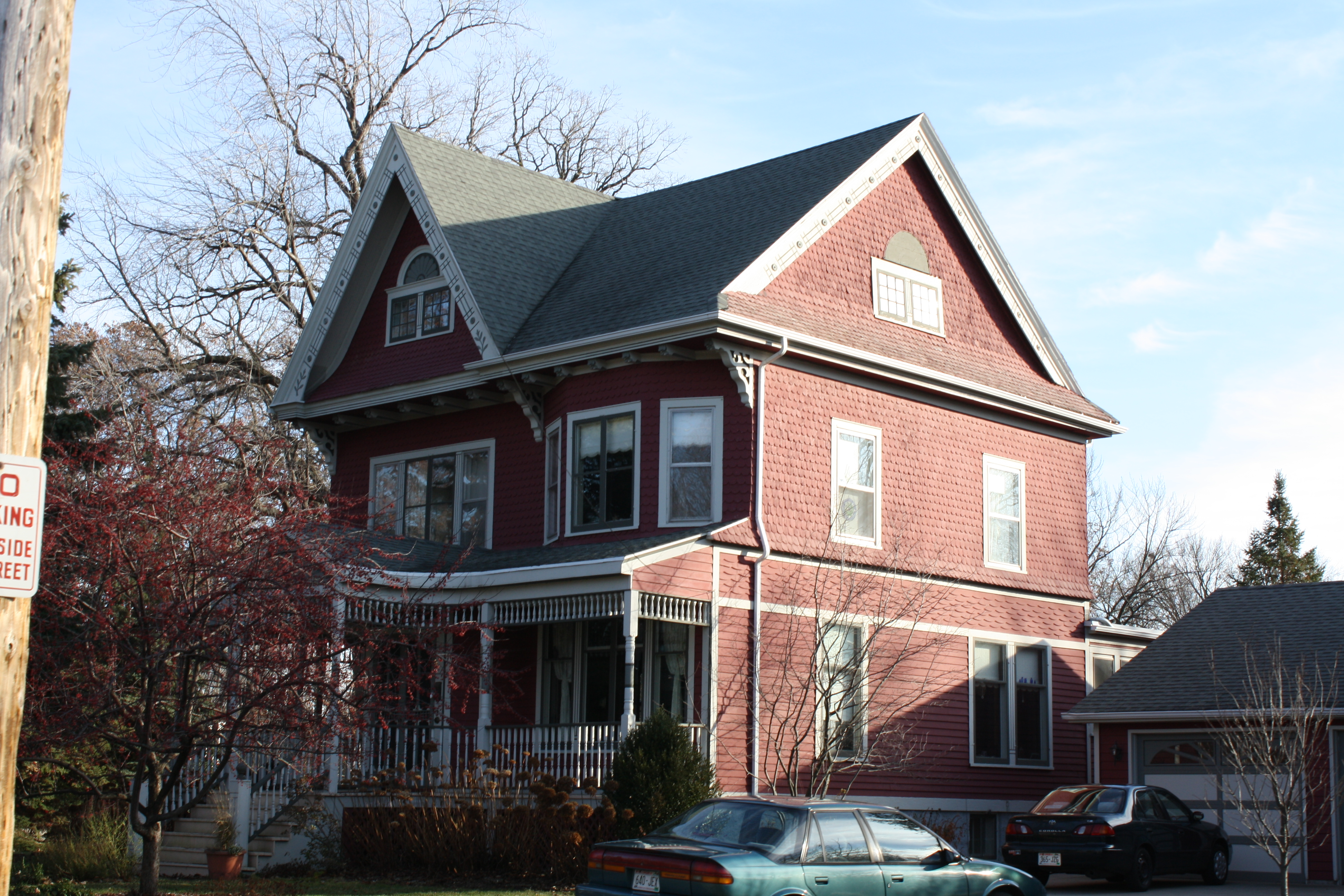
- Ellis Jennings House
- Location: 711 E. Forest Ave., Neenah, Wisconsin
- Coordinates: 44°11′24″N 88°26′54″W
- Area: less than one acre
- Built: 1893
- Architect: William Waters
- Architectural style: Queen Anne
- NRHP reference No.: 92000110
- Added to NRHP: March 20, 1992

The Ellis Jennings House is located in Neenah, Wisconsin.

== History ==
The house belonged to Ellis Jennings, a partner in a local lumber company. It was added to the State and the National Register of Historic Places in 1992.
