= Richard Guenther House =

Historic house in Wisconsin, United States

- U.S. National Register of Historic Places
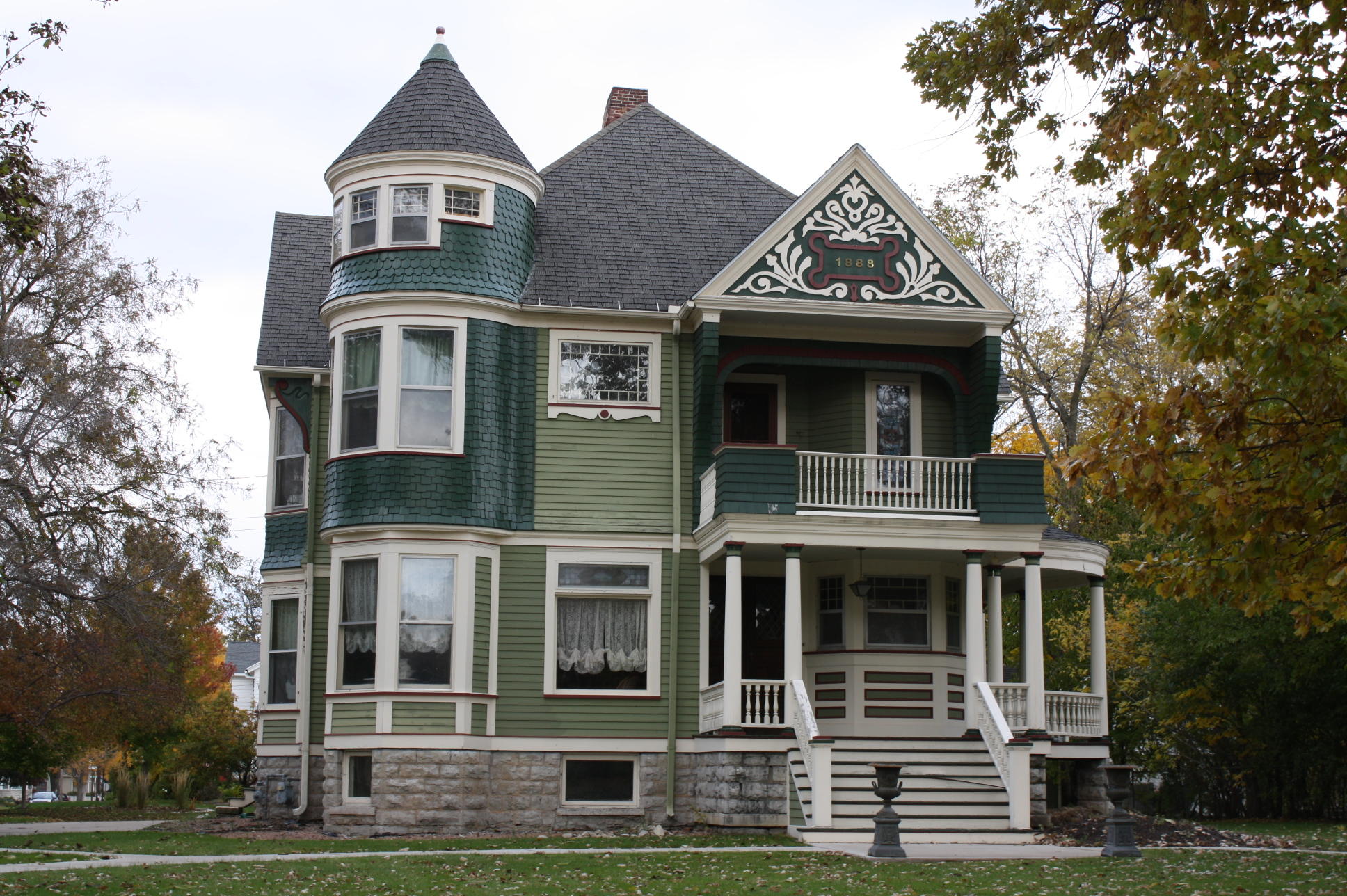

- Location within Wisconsin Location within the United States
- Location: 1200 Washington Ave., Oshkosh, Wisconsin
- Coordinates: 44°1′5″N 88°31′18″W
- Built: 1888
- Architect: William Waters
- Architectural style: Queen Anne
- NRHP reference No.: 84003824
- Added to NRHP: March 1, 1984

The Richard Guenther House in Oshkosh, Wisconsin, United States, is a large, fine Queen Anne house designed by Waters and built by Jacob Rheiner in 1888 for Richard W. Guenther. Guenther was a Prussian immigrant who owned a drug store in Oshkosh, became Wisconsin state treasurer, U.S. representative, and consul to Mexico City, Frankfurt, and Cape Town. From 1906 to 1913 the large house hosted Dr. M. E. Corbett's new Lakeside Sanitorium and Training School for Nurses, the first hospital in Oshkosh, which later evolved into Mercy Medical Center.

Largely unaltered, the house was listed on the National Register of Historic Places in 1984 for its architectural significance, for its association with Guenther, and for its service as Oshkosh's first hospital.
