= Brooklyn No. 4 Fire House =

- U.S. National Register of Historic Places
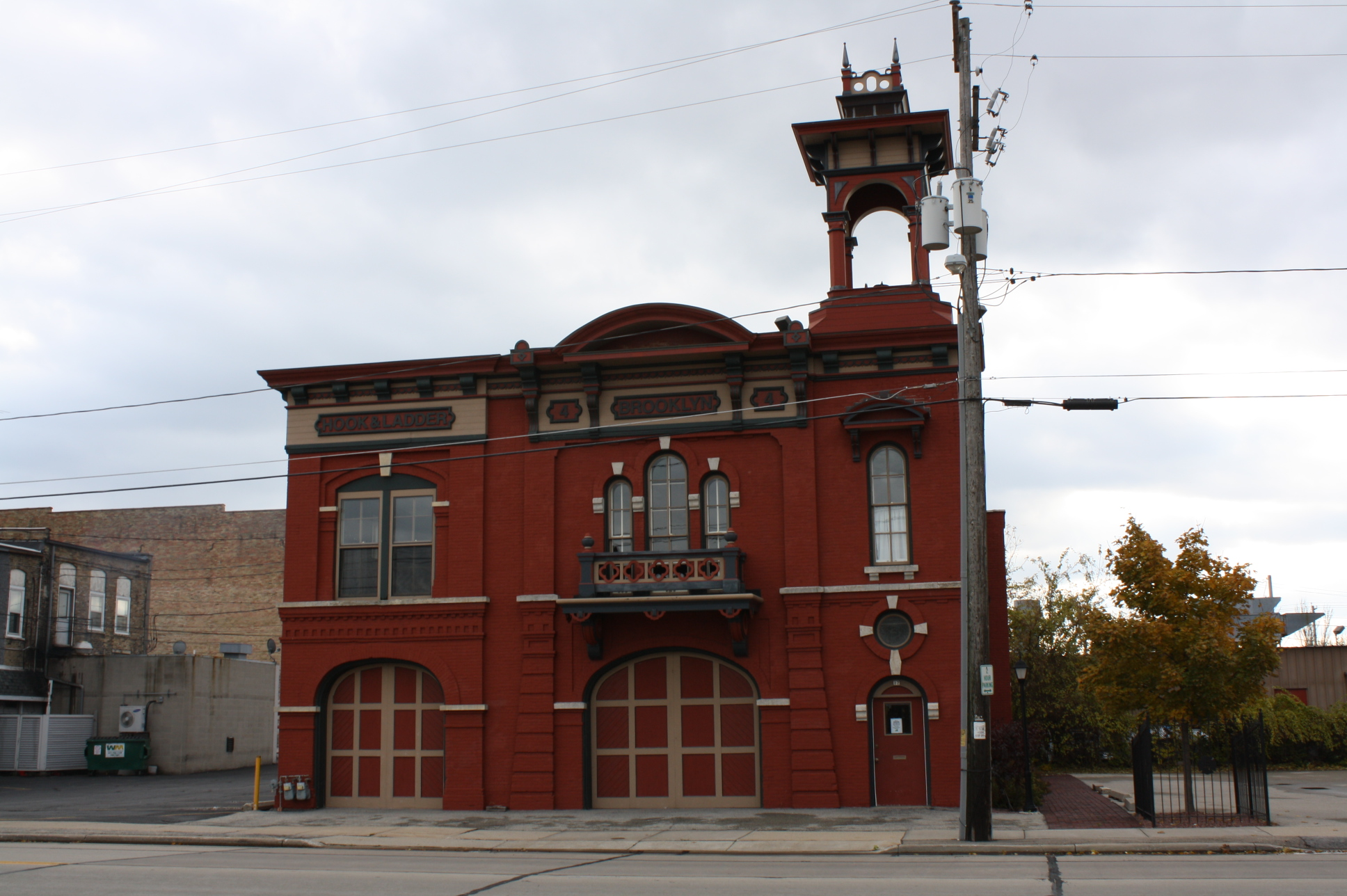
- Brooklyn No. 4 Fire House

- Location within Wisconsin Location within the United States
- Location: 17 W. Sixth Ave., Oshkosh, Wisconsin
- Coordinates: 44°00′44″N 88°32′19″W
- Area: less than one acre
- Built: 1868
- Architect: William Waters
- Architectural style: Italianate
- NRHP reference No.: 95001505
- Added to NRHP: January 11, 1996

The Brooklyn No. 4 Fire House is located in Oshkosh, Wisconsin.

== History ==
The fire house was designed by William Waters and built in 1868, after major fires in 1859 and 1866. By the time it closed in 1946, #4 spanned the transitions from volunteer firemen to professionals, from mobile pumps to hose wagons, and from horses to motorized trucks.

Later, the building housed a sign company for a time. It was added to the State Register of Historic Places in 1995 and to the National Register of Historic Places the following year.
