= Trinity Episcopal Church (Oshkosh, Wisconsin) =

Historic church in Wisconsin, United States

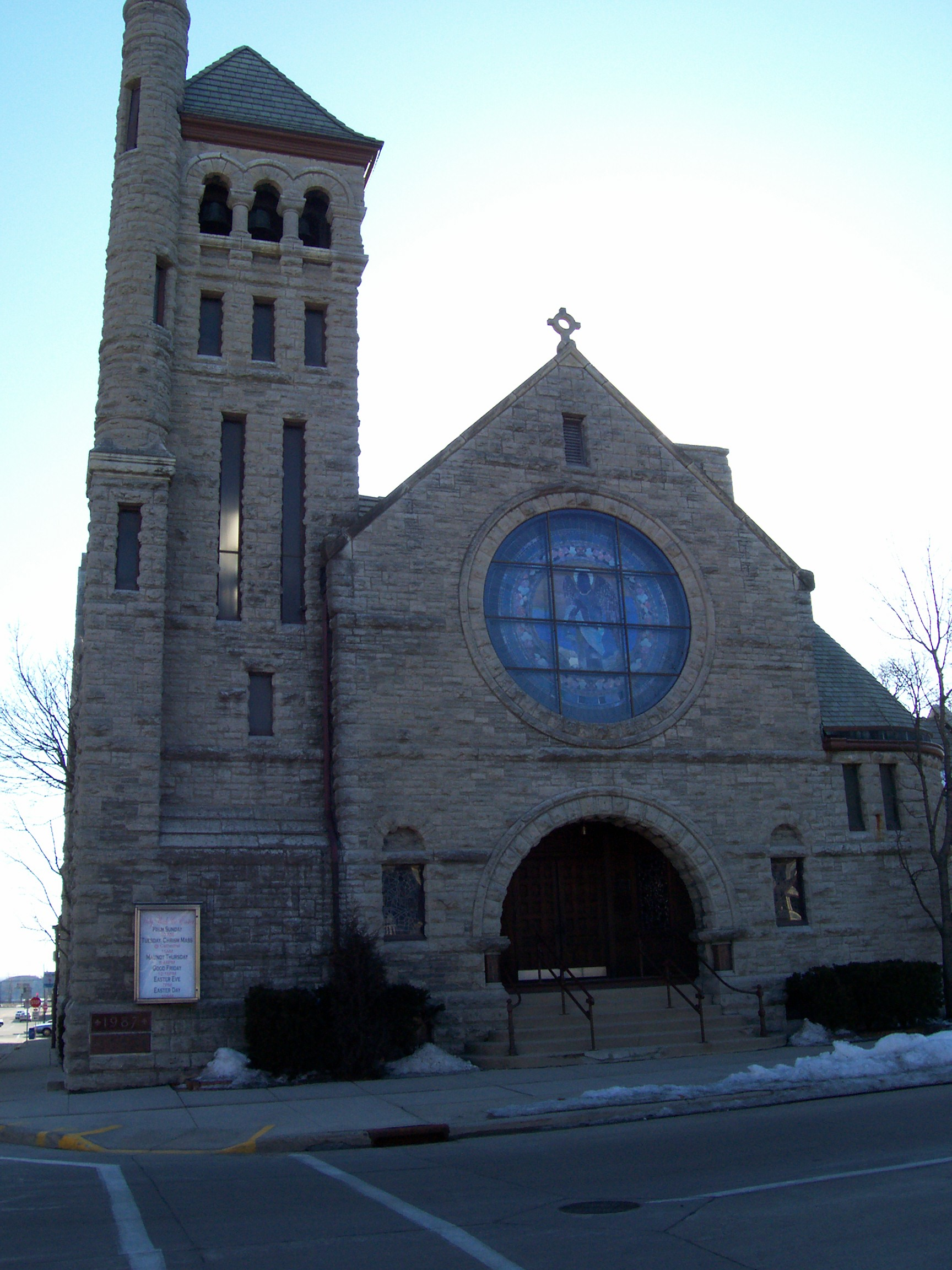

Religion
- Affiliation: Episcopal, Anglican
- District: Episcopal Diocese of Wisconsin
- Province: Province V
- Ecclesiastical or organizational status: Parish church
- Leadership: The Rev. Dr. Christopher Corbin, Rector
- Year consecrated: 1887 (current building)

Location
- Location: Oshkosh, Wisconsin, United States
- Interactive map of Trinity Episcopal Church
- Coordinates: 44.0188°N 88.5402°W

Architecture
- Architect: William Waters
- Type: Church
- Style: Richardsonian Romanesque
- Completed: 1887 (current building)

Specifications
- Direction of façade: northeast
- Materials: stone

- Trinity Episcopal Church
- U.S. National Register of Historic Places
- NRHP reference No.: 74000145
- Added to NRHP: 1974

Trinity Episcopal Church is a historic Episcopal church located in Oshkosh, Wisconsin. The only Episcopal church in Oshkosh, Trinity is in the Episcopal Diocese of Wisconsin. The congregation first met in 1850, organizing as Trinity Episcopal Church in 1854. The current church building, which was constructed in 1887, is an example of Richardsonian Romanesque architecture. It was added to the National Register of Historic Places in 1974.

In 2015, the church reported 302 members; in 2023, it reported 127 members. No membership statistics were reported in 2024 national parochial reports. Plate and pledge financial support reported by the church in 2024 was $213,570. Average Sunday Attendance ASA reported in 2024 was 60 persons. This was a relative decrease on ASA of 76 in 2015.

== History ==
Missionary priest Franklin R. Haff held the first Episcopal service in Oshkosh in 1850. The parish was briefly organized as St. Peter's parish, then reorganized as Trinity Episcopal Church in 1854, with David W. Tolford serving as first rector. The first church building was a wooden structure built and consecrated in 1857, and located at Algoma Boulevard and Division street. In 1887, the original building was razed, and the current stone structure, a Richardsonian Romanesque design by architect William Waters, was built on the same site.
