= William Waters (architect) =

American architect

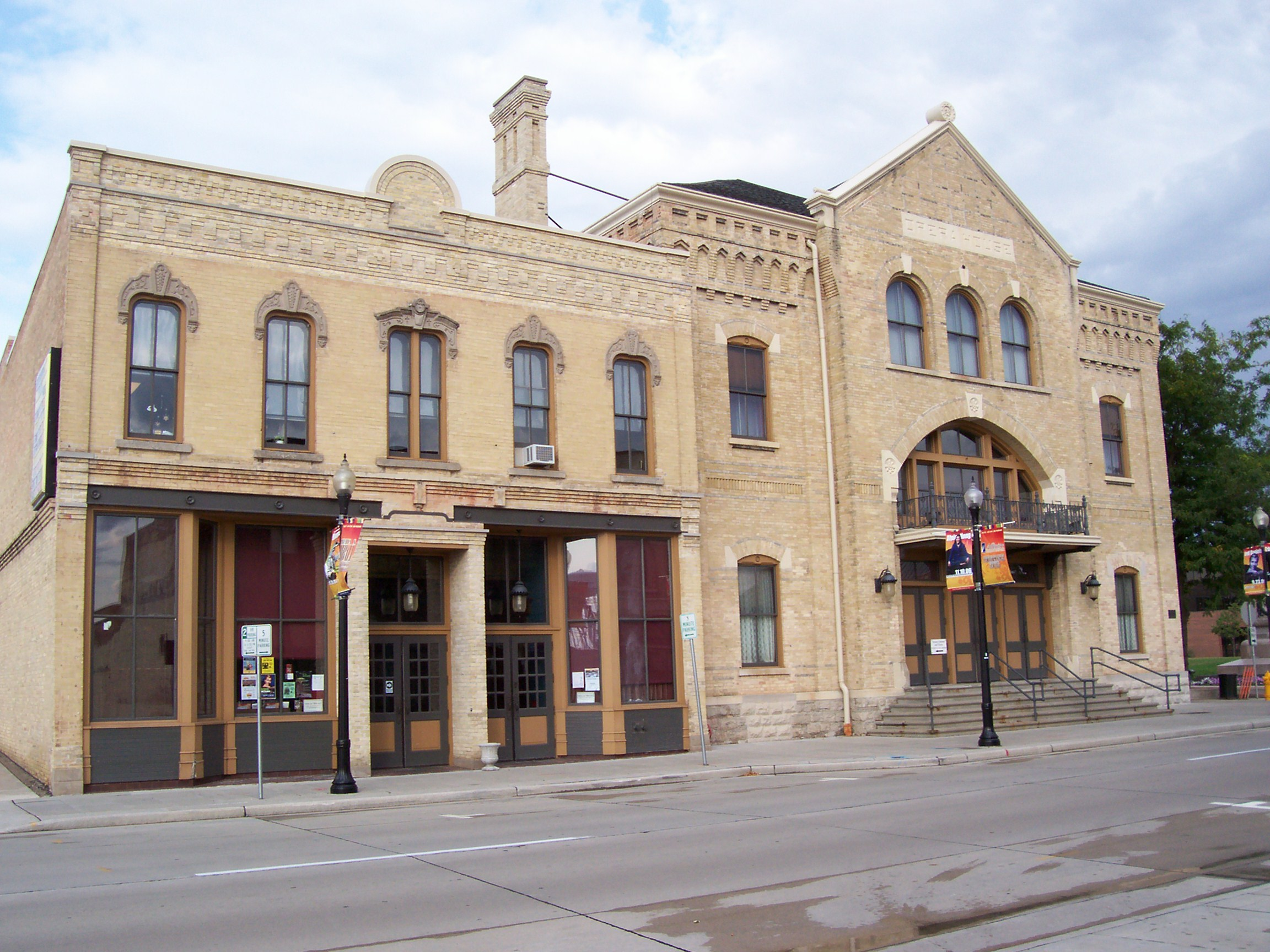
Oshkosh Grand Opera House, built in 1883

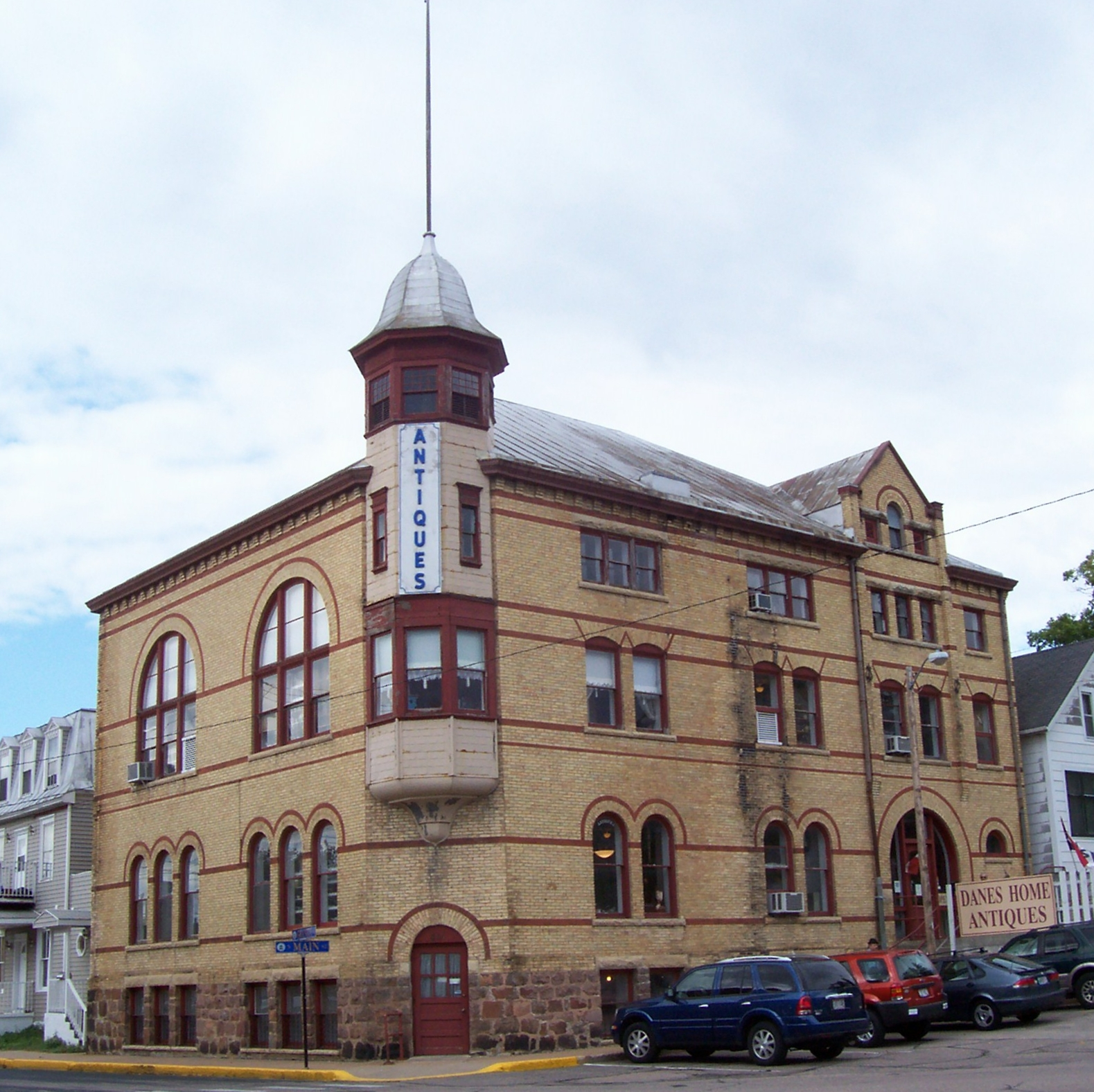
Danes Hall, built in 1894

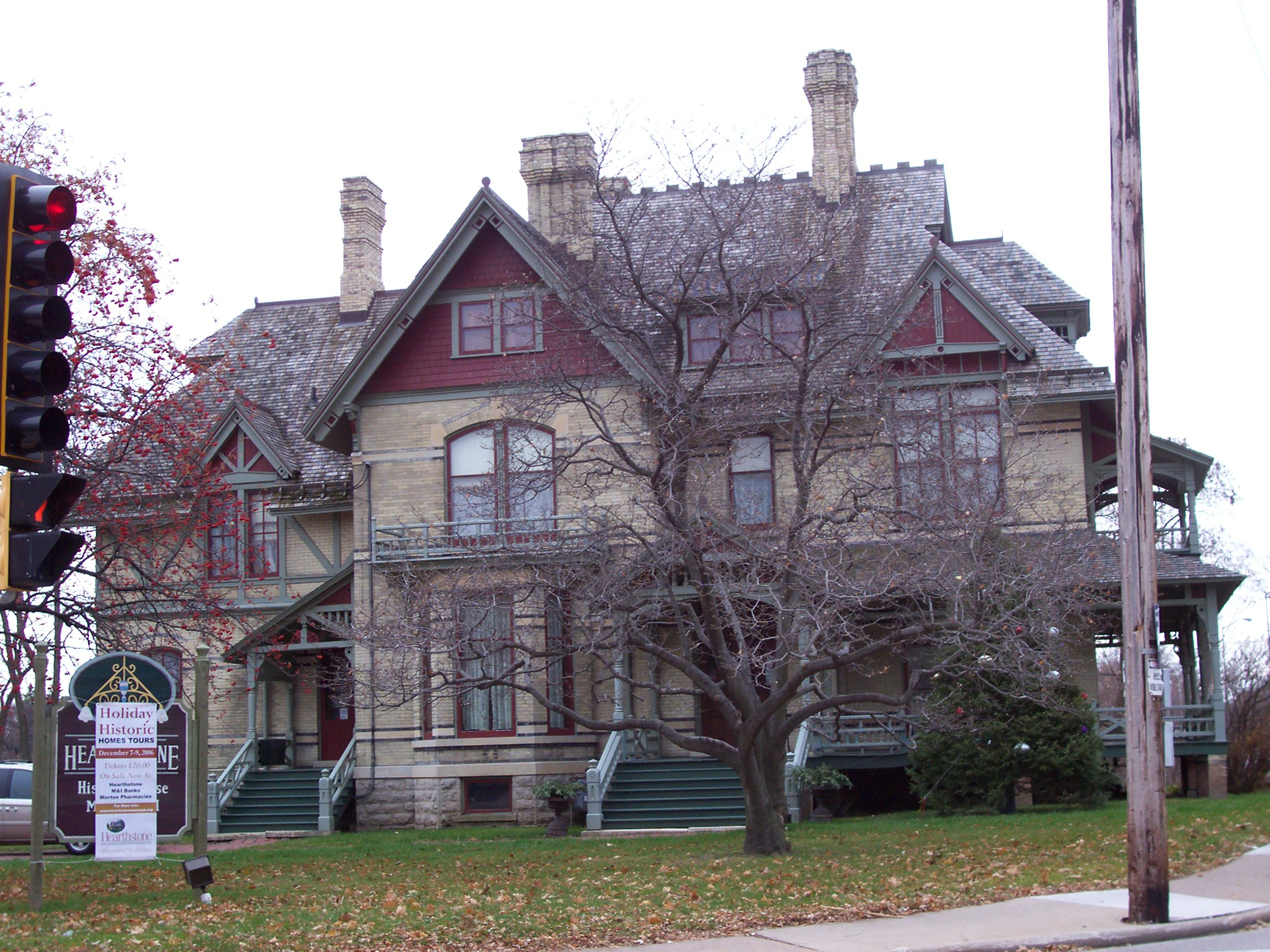
Hearthstone

William Waters (1843–1917) was an American architect who designed numerous buildings in Wisconsin that eventually were listed on the National Register of Historic Places. He was responsible for designing much of historic Oshkosh, Wisconsin. He was also responsible for designing the Wisconsin building for the Columbian Exposition. Waters died in 1917 and is buried at Riverside Cemetery in Oshkosh. After his death, Oshkosh honored him by naming the intersection of Washington Avenue and State Street as the "William Waters Plaza".

His works include:

- King House, 421 Waugoo Ave., Oshkosh, WI
- Oscar F. Crary House, 310 Waugoo Ave., Oshkosh, WI. Built in 1880. Was winner of the City of Oshkosh Acanthus Award in 1987 for Exterior Preservation completed by Daniel Beyerl, owner of the home at that time.
- Havilah Babcock House, 537 E. Wisconsin Ave., Neenah, WI
- George, Sr., and Ellen Banta House, 348 Naymut St., Menasha, WI
- George O. Bergstrom House, 579 E. Wisconsin Ave., Neenah, WI
- Commandant's Residence Home, Off WI 22, King, WI
- Danes Hall, 303 N. Main St., Waupaca, WI, built in 1894
- Green Lake County Courthouse, 492 Hill St., Green Lake, WI
- Richard Guenther House, 1200 Washington Ave., Oshkosh, WI
- Hearthstone, 625 W. Prospect Ave., Appleton, WI
- Hotel Menasha, 177 Main St., Menasha, Wisconsin
- Jessie Jack Hooper House, 1149 Algoma Blvd., Oshkosh, WI
- Ellis Jennings House, 711 E. Forest Ave., Neenah, WI
- Robert Lutz House, 1449 Knapp St. Oshkosh, WI
- Orville Beach Memorial Manual Training School, 240 Algoma Blvd., Oshkosh, WI
- Oshkosh Grand Opera House, 100 High Ave., Oshkosh, WI
- Oshkosh Public Museum, 1331 Algoma Blvd., Oshkosh, WI, originally the Edgar P. Sawyer residence, 1908
- Oviatt House, 842 Algoma Blvd., Oshkosh, WI
- Read School, 1120 Algoma Blvd., Oshkosh, WI
- Henry Sherry House, 527 E. Wisconsin Ave., Neenah, WI
- Henry Spencer Smith House, 706 E. Forest Ave., Neenah, WI
- Smith School, 1745 Oregon St., Oshkosh, 1895
- South Hall, River Falls State Normal School, 320 E. Cascade Ave., River Falls, WI
- Trinity Episcopal Church, 203 Algoma Blvd., Oshkosh, WI
- Thomas R. Wall Residence, 751 Algoma Blvd., Oshkosh, WI
- John Hart Whorton House, 315 W. Prospect Ave., Appleton, WI
- Brooklyn No. 4 Fire House, 17 W. Sixth Ave., Oshkosh, WI
- Kewaunee County Sheriff's Residence and Jail, Court House Sq., jct. of Dodge and Vliet Sts., Kewaunee, WI
- Perry Lindsley House, 1102 E. Forest Ave., Neenah, WI
- Godfried Ulrich House, 308 East Wisconsin Ave., Neenah, WI

He also designed properties that contributed to the following Historic Districts:

- Algoma Boulevard Historic District, Roughly, Algoma Blvd. from Woodland Ave. to Hollister Ave., Oshkosh, WI
- East Forest Avenue Historic District, Generally bounded by E. Forest Ave., Webster St., Hewitt St. and Eleventh St., Neenah, WI
- Irving Church Historic District, Roughly bounded by W. Irving Ave., Franklin St., Church Ave., Wisconsin St. and Amherst Ave., Oshkosh, WI
- Main Street Historic District, Roughly along S. and N. Main Sts. from W. Union to Granite Sts., Waupaca, WI
- Nathan Strong Park Historic District, Roughly bounded by N. Wisconsin, E. Moore, N. Swetting and E. Huron Sts., Berlin, WI
- North Main Street Historic District, Roughly, N. Main St. from Parkway Ave. to Algoma Blvd., and Market St. NW. to High Ave., Oshkosh, WI
- Veterans Cottages Historic District, Off WI 22, King, WI
- Washington Avenue Historic District, Roughly bounded by Merritt Ave., Linde and Lampert Sts., Washington Ave., Bowen and Evan Sts., Oshkosh, WI
- West Prospect Avenue Historic District, 315-330 West Prospect Ave., Appleton, WI
