= Perry Lindsley House =

Historic house in Wisconsin, United States

- U.S. National Register of Historic Places
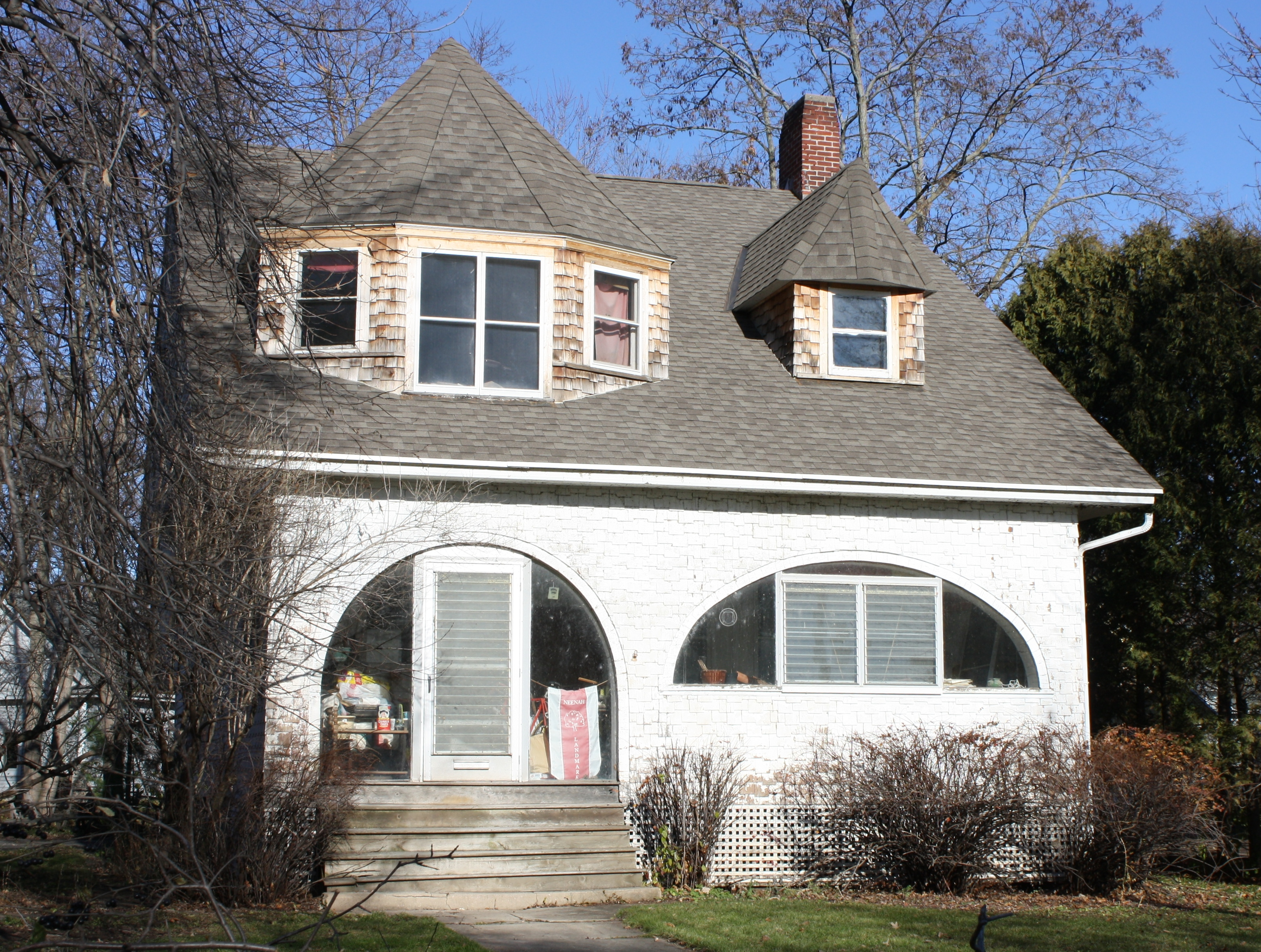
- Perry Lindsley House
- Location: 1102 E. Forest Ave., Neenah, Wisconsin
- Coordinates: 44°11′33″N 88°26′36″W
- Area: less than one acre
- Built: 1893
- Architect: William Waters
- Architectural style: Shingle Style
- NRHP reference No.: 03000899
- Added to NRHP: September 2, 2003

The Perry Lindsley House is located in Neenah, Wisconsin. It was added to both the State and the National Register of Historic Places in 2003.
