= Henry Sherry House =

Historic house in Wisconsin, United States

- U.S. National Register of Historic Places
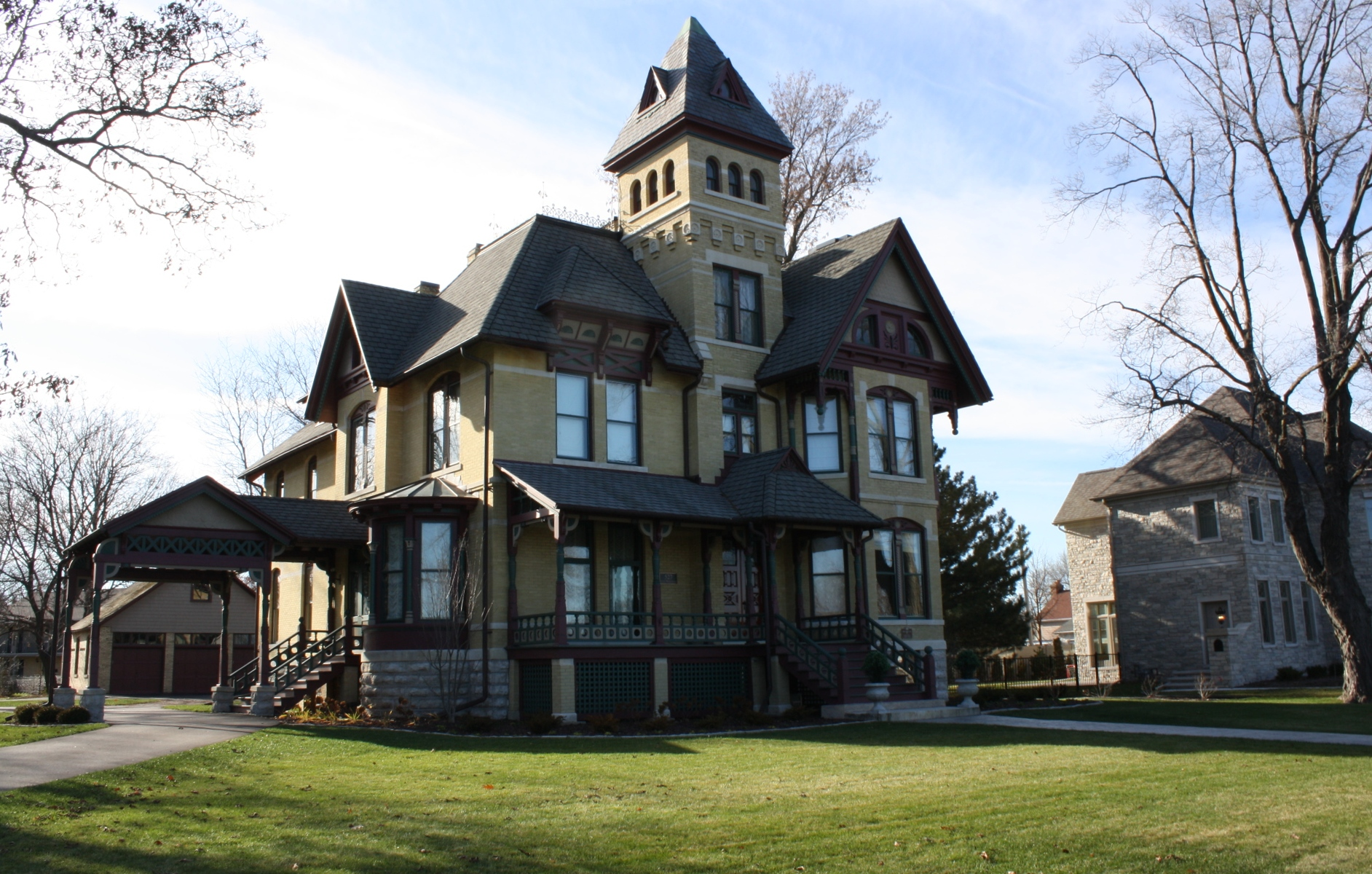
- Henry Sherry House

- Location within Wisconsin Location within the United States
- Location: 527 E. Wisconsin Ave., Neenah, Wisconsin
- Coordinates: 44°11′00″N 88°27′06″W
- Area: less than one acre
- Built: 1883
- Architect: William Waters
- Architectural style: Gothic Revival/Queen Anne
- NRHP reference No.: 99001607
- Added to NRHP: December 22, 1999

The Henry Sherry House is a historic house located in Neenah, Wisconsin.

Home with 5-story tower and porte cochere, designed by Waters in High Victorian Gothic style with some Queen Anne decoration and built in 1883. Sherry was a lumberman with interests in northeastern and central Wisconsin. The house was later the home of Hugh Strange of the Strange Lumber Company.

It is a masonry two-story Late Victorian Gothic-style house, upon a limestone ashlar foundation, built in 1883. It has a five-story square tower.

Henry Sherry was a successful lumberman.

The house was added to the State and the National Register of Historic Places in 1999.
