= Robert Lutz House =

Historic house in Wisconsin, United States

- U.S. National Register of Historic Places
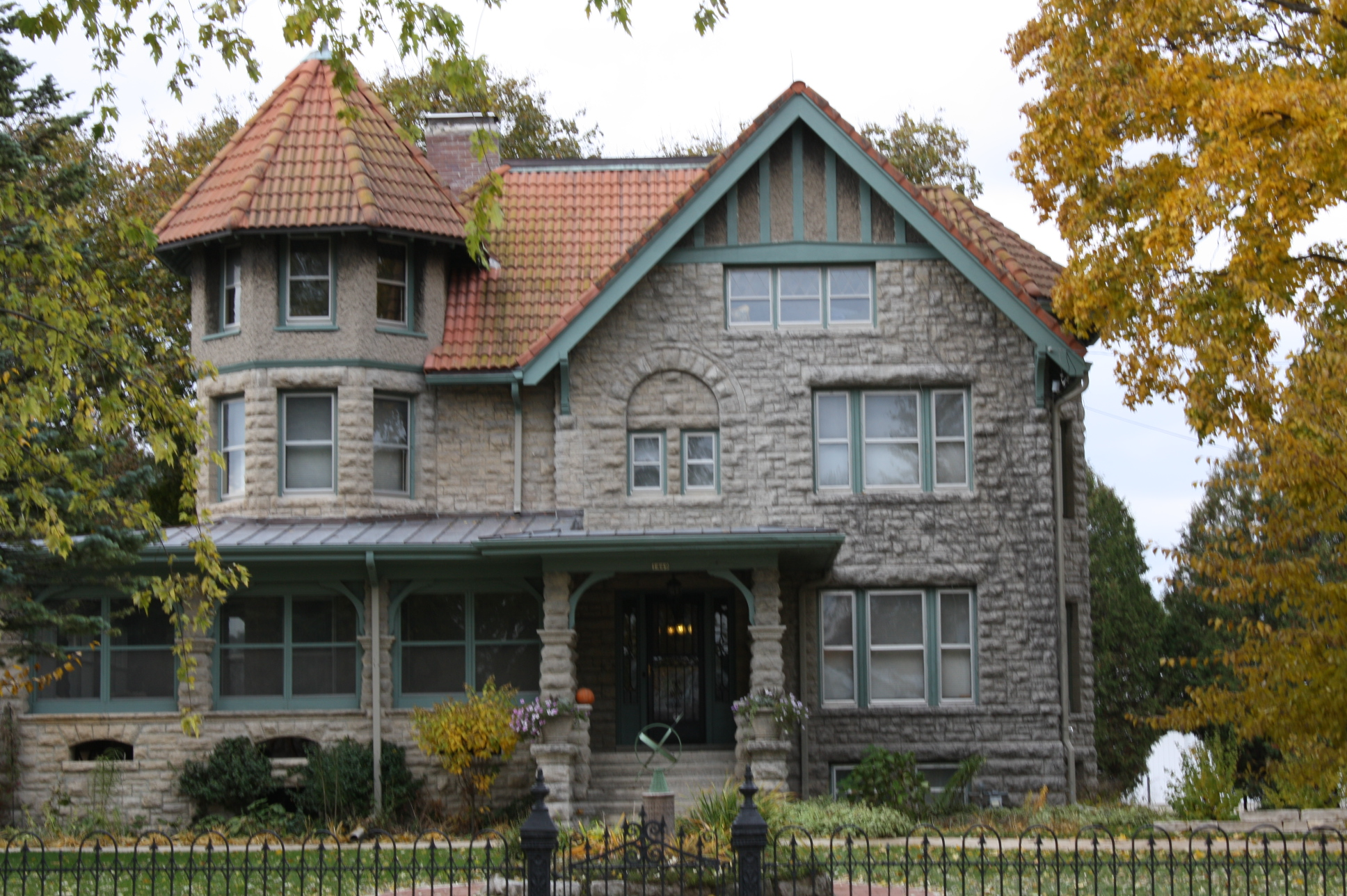

- Location within Wisconsin Location within the United States
- Location: 1449 Knapp St., Oshkosh, Wisconsin
- Coordinates: 44°0′17″N 88°33′47″W
- Area: 3.1 acres (1.3 ha)
- Built: 1910, 1925
- Built by: C.R. Meyer Construction Company
- Architect: William Waters; Henry Auler (Auler & Jensen)
- Architectural style: Late Victorian, Queen Anne, Richardsonian Romanesque
- NRHP reference No.: 82000734
- Added to NRHP: May 27, 1982

Robert Lutz House, sometimes referred to as Lutz Mansion, is a home located at 1449 Knapp Street in Oshkosh, Wisconsin, United States. Situated at the corner of Knapp Street and South Park Avenue, it was the home of Robert Lutz, owner of Lutz Brothers Stone Quarry. The home was designed by architect William Waters and built by C.R. Meyer Construction Company using stone from the Lutz-owned quarry. Built in 1910 on 1.6 acres of land, the structure also served as the quarry master's office, complete with separate entrance. The home is now owned by the Gafner Family Trust, Rebecca and Douglas Gafner II as co-trustees.

The house is adjacent to Lutz's quarry. A brick barn that matches the house is also on the property, designed by Water's associate Henry Auler and built in 1925 for Lutz's Belgian horses. Also surviving is a pigeon coop.
