= George O. Bergstrom House =

Historic house in Wisconsin, United States

- U.S. National Register of Historic Places
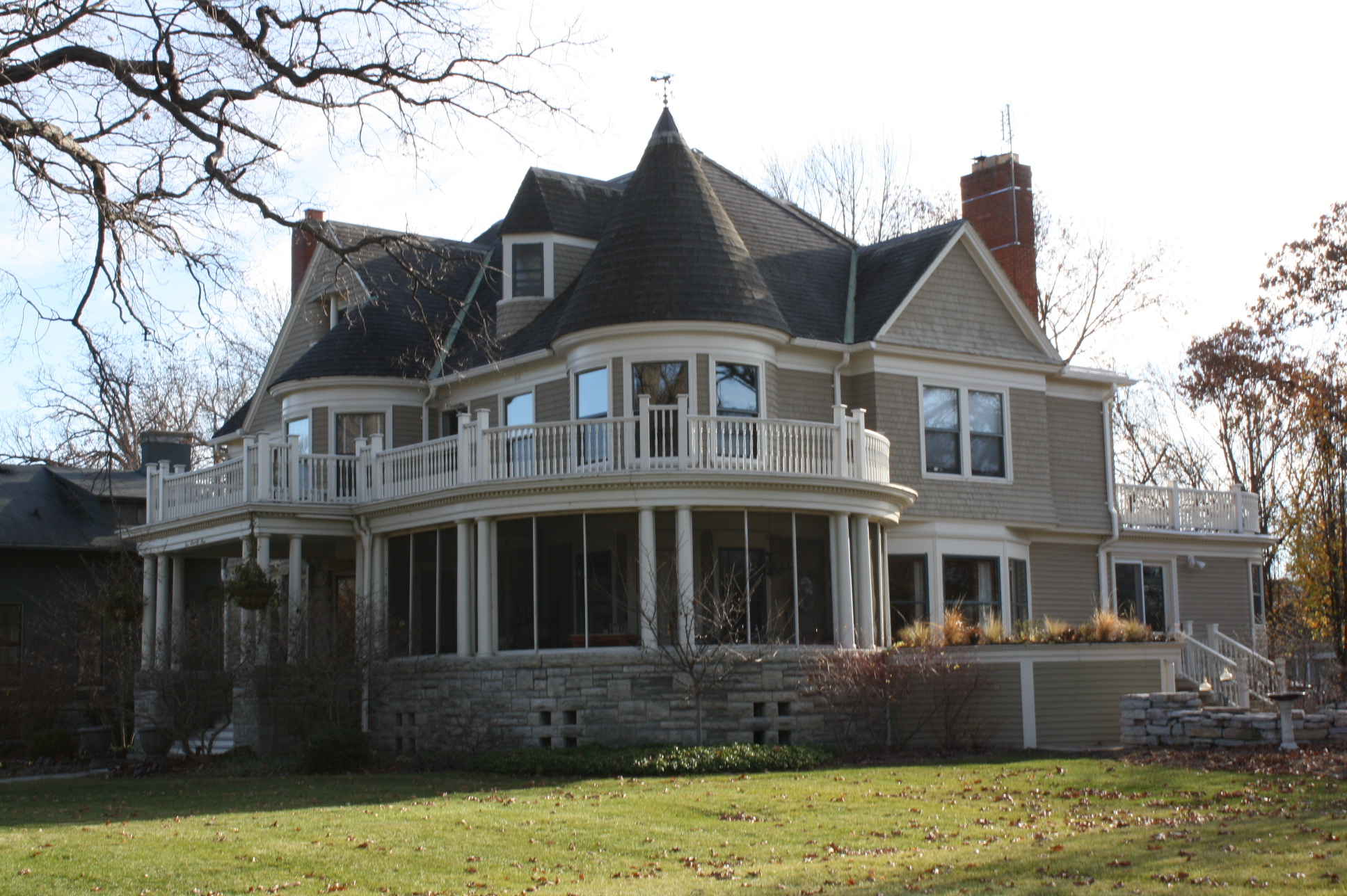
- George O. Bergstrom House
- Location: 579 E. Wisconsin Ave., Neenah, Wisconsin
- Coordinates: 44°10′50″N 88°26′59″W
- Area: less than one acre
- Built: 1894
- Architect: William Waters
- Architectural style: Queen Anne, Shingle Style
- NRHP reference No.: 93000144
- Added to NRHP: March 22, 1993

The George O. Bergstrom House is located in Neenah, Wisconsin.

== History ==
The house was owned by prominent businessman and local politician George O. Bergstrom. In addition, his son, George Edwin Bergstrom was raised in the house. The younger Bergstrom would become a noted architect who designed many famous buildings, arguably the most famous being The Pentagon.

The house was added to the State Register of Historic Places in 1992 and to the National Register of Historic Places the following year.
