= Orville Beach Memorial Manual Training School =

- U.S. National Register of Historic Places
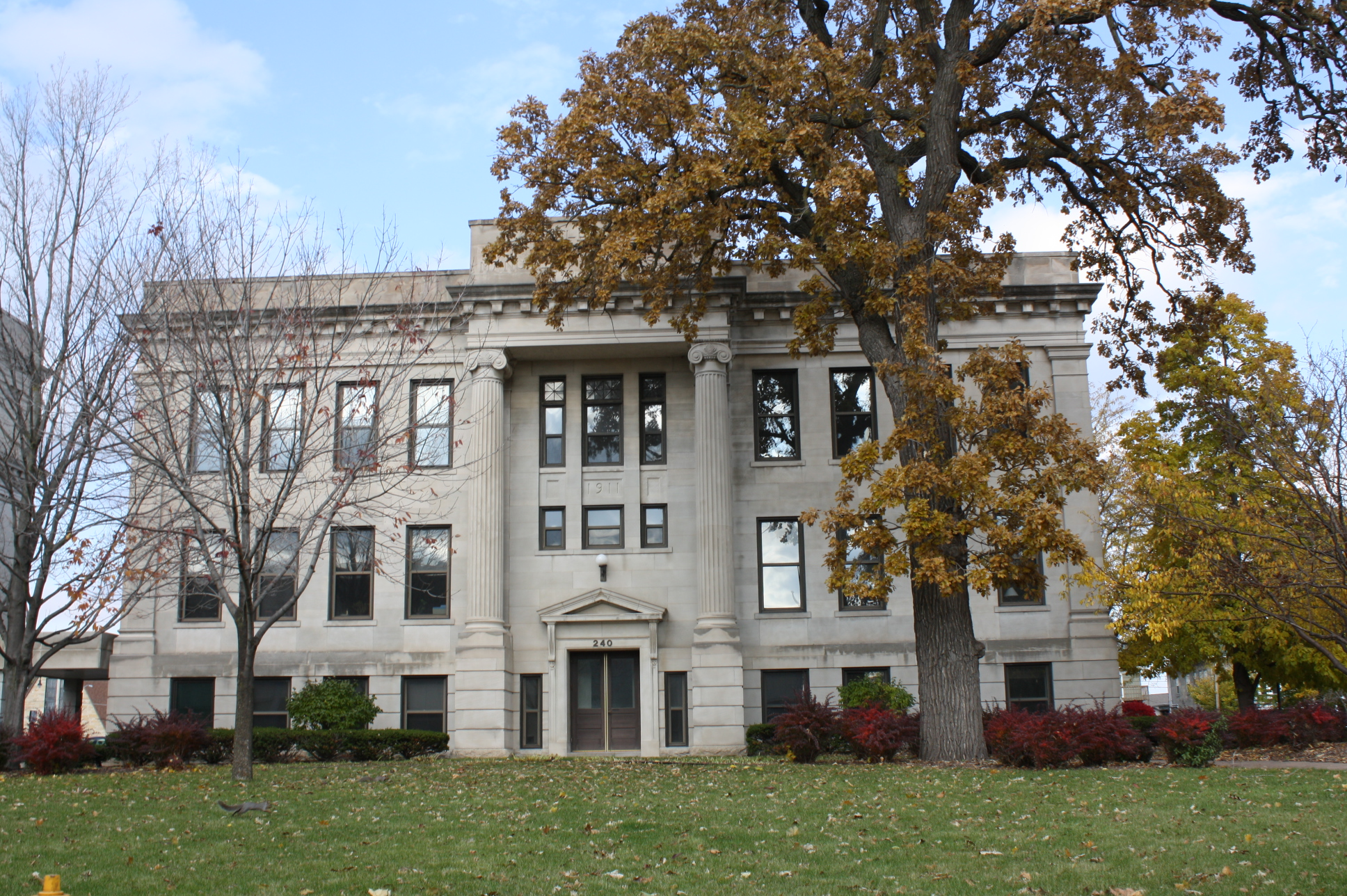
- Orville Beach Memorial Manual Training School
- Location: 240 Algoma Blvd., Oshkosh, Wisconsin
- Coordinates: 44°01′11″N 88°32′25″W
- Area: 1.8 acres (0.73 ha)
- Built: 1911-1912
- Architect: William Waters
- Architectural style: Neoclassical
- NRHP reference No.: 85002334
- Added to NRHP: September 12, 1985

The Orville Beach Memorial Manual Training School is located in Oshkosh, Wisconsin.

== History ==
Orville Beach was a local businessman and politician. The school was established in 1912. It was listed on the National Register of Historic Places in 1985 and on the State Register of Historic Places in 1989.
