= Oviatt House =

Historic house in Wisconsin, United States

- U.S. National Register of Historic Places
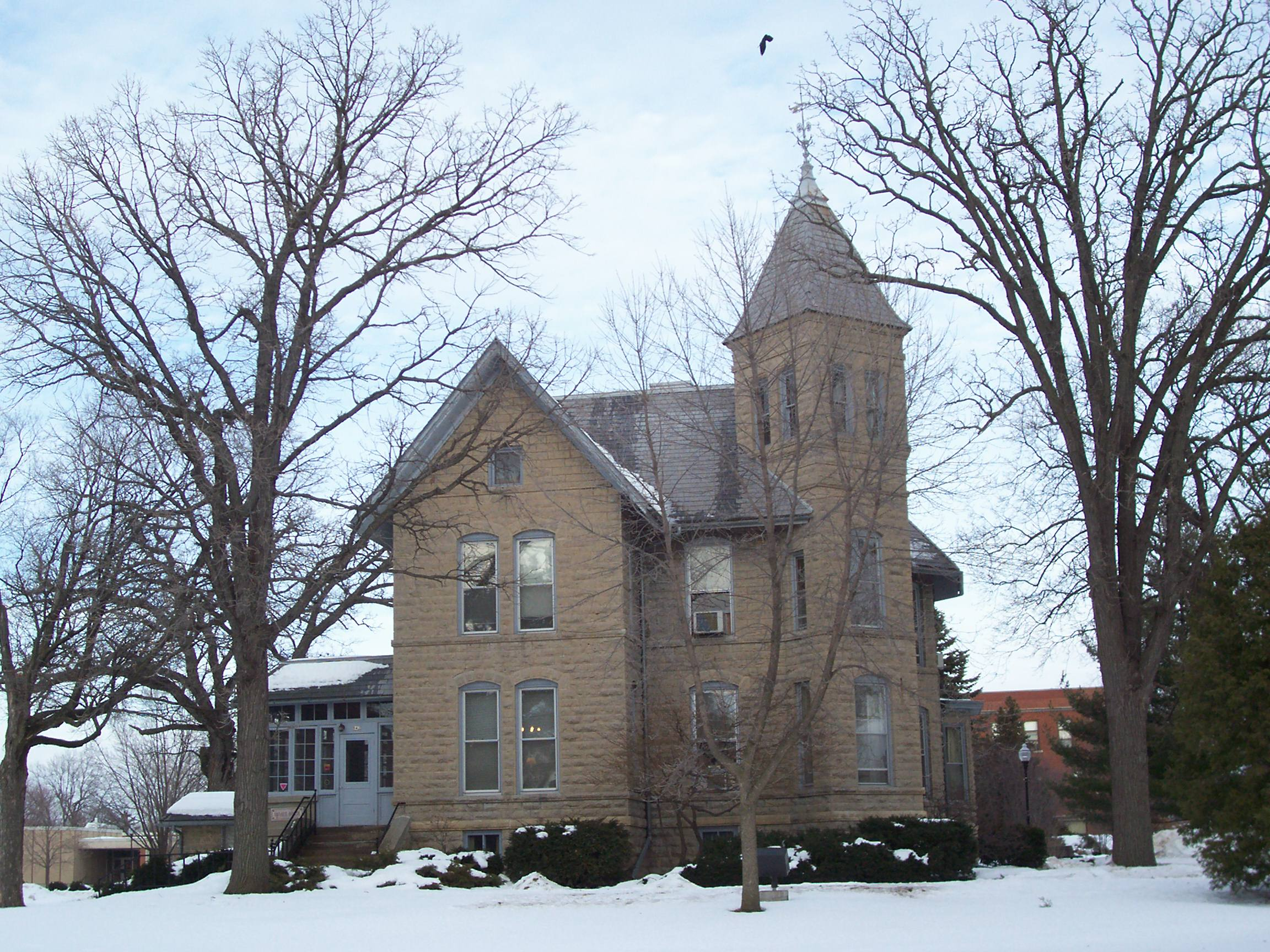
- Oviatt House

- Location within Wisconsin Location within the United States
- Interactive map showing the location of Oviatt House
- Location: 842 Algoma Blvd., Oshkosh, Wisconsin
- Coordinates: 44°01′38″N 88°33′06″W
- Area: 1.2 acres (0.49 ha)
- Built: 1883
- Architect: William Waters
- Architectural style: Gothic Revival
- NRHP reference No.: 79000121
- Added to NRHP: August 27, 1979

The Oviatt House is located in Oshkosh, Wisconsin.

== History ==
The house was designed by Waters and built in 1883 for Moses Hooper. Hooper was an Oshkosh attorney who represented Kimberly-Clark among others, and was such an authority on riparian rights that he appeared before the US Supreme Court repeatedly. In 1900 the house was bought by Dr. Charles Oviatt, a noted surgeon who insisted that nuns assisting in surgery wear sterilized garb rather than woolen habits, and eventually received a letter of agreement from Pope Leo XIII.

After Oviatt's death, the house was purchased by what is now the University of Wisconsin-Oshkosh. The school has used it as a girl's dormitory, the president's residence and a charity headquarters. In 1979, the house was listed on the National Register of Historic Places and it was also listed on the State Register of Historic Places in 1989.

It is located in the Oshkosh State Normal School Historic District.
