= Larry Johnson =

Larry Johnson may refer to:

== Arts and entertainment ==
- Larry Johnson (artist), American artist
- Larry Johnson (author) (born 1960), American author of the book Frozen
- Larry Johnson (film producer) (1947–2010), American filmmaker
- Larry Johnson (musician) (1938–2016), American blues singer and guitarist

== Politics ==
- Larry Johnson (Georgia politician), Georgia State Senator
- Larry Johnson (Michigan politician), Michigan State Representative
- Larry C. Johnson, American political commentator and former CIA analyst

== Sports ==
=== American football ===
- Larry Johnson (running back) (born 1979), American football running back
- Larry Johnson (linebacker) (1909–1972), American football linebacker
- Larry Johnson (American football coach) (born c. 1952), American football coach

=== Other sports ===
- Larry Johnson (baseball) (1950–2013), American baseball player
- Larry Johnson (basketball, born 1969), American basketball player, nicknamed "Grandmama"
- Larry Johnson (basketball, born 1954) (1954–2025), American basketball player
- Larry Johnson (wrestler) (1945–2024), American professional wrestler, best known as Sonny King

== Other people ==
- Laurence F. Johnson (born 1950), American futurist, author, and educator
- Larry R. Johnson (1944–1998), American meteorologist

== See also ==
- Larry Johnston (born 1943), ice hockey player
- Lawrence Johnson (disambiguation)
