= Laurence Johnson =

Laurence Johnson may refer to:

- Laurence F. Johnson (born 1950), American futurist, author, and educator
- Laurence A. Johnson, owner of supermarkets in Syracuse, New York
- Laurence Johnson (cricketer) (born 1936), English former cricketer
- Laurie Johnson (1927–2024), English film and television composer, and bandleader

== See also ==
- Lawrence Johnson (disambiguation)
- Laurie Johnson (disambiguation)
