= SDMS =

SDMS may refer to:

- Sanatan Dharma Maha Sabha, Hindu organisation in Trinidad and Tobago
- Scientific data management system
- Society of Diagnostic Medical Sonography
- Silas Deane Middle School
- S.D.Ms., an abbreviation used for the United States District Court for the Southern District of Mississippi
