= Horizon Project =

EDUCAUSE initiative

The Horizon Project (or Horizon Report) is an initiative by EDUCAUSE to chart emerging technologies and trends impacting the future of higher education across domains such as teaching and learning and information security. Drawing on insights from a global panel of leaders from across the higher education landscape, the objective of each Horizon Report is to shape decision-making among higher education professionals by helping them imagine a range of possible futures and think through the present-day implications of those futures. The Horizon Project was launched in 2002 by Laurence F. Johnson, CEO of New Media Consortium (NMC), and since the 2018 edition has been published by EDUCAUSE.

== NMC Horizon Project History ==
Starting in 2005, the NMC-published Horizon reports were collaboratively developed by co-authors Johnson and Rachel S. Smith. In 2006, Alan Levine joined the production team, and Keene Haywood joined in 2010. In 2011, Samantha Adams succeeded Smith as the project's lead researcher and writer. In 2011, Horizon Report downloads surpassed the 500,000 mark and worldwide readership approached a million people. A brand new museum edition was released in October 2010 to the museum community, along with reports for K-12 education and for Australia - New Zealand. The NMC Horizon Project expanded to Latin America in that year, when for the first time, a Horizon research cycle was conducted completely in Spanish. The 2010 Horizon Report: Edicion Iberoamericana was released in July 2010.

== EDUCAUSE Horizon Report ==
Since EDUCAUSE's acquisition of NMC in 2018, the Horizon Report has been published by EDUCAUSE and continues to be a highly regarded and widely read resource for technology, IT, and higher education professionals. Starting with the 2020 Teaching & Learning Edition of the report, the EDUCAUSE Horizon team has incorporated futures concepts adapted from the Institute for the Future, marking a notable shift in tone away from predicting the future (a perennial area of contention surrounding previous report editions) to imagining a range of possible scenarios for the future. This shift in tone was well-received and has been incorporated into subsequent editions of the report.

Each EDUCAUSE Horizon Report is put together collaboratively by an expert panel consisting of an international group of educational experts that are selected by-invitation-only. Following a modified Delphi method approach, expert panelists are asked to identify, discuss, and vote on the key trends, technologies, and practices they believe are going to shape the future of a particular domain within higher education. The top trends, technologies, and practices identified by the expert panel are then used to craft a set of future scenarios, as well as a set of implications essays authored by a selection of panelists representing diverse contexts and perspectives.

The EDUCAUSE Horizon Reports are part of a larger suite of EDUCAUSE research products intended to help higher education leaders and decision-makers understand what is important in their field and where they should focus in their strategic planning and management. Other research products in this suite include the annual Top IT Issues reports and the Strategic Technologies and Trend Watch reports.

== EDUCAUSE Horizon Reports ==
- 2025 Horizon Report: Teaching & Learning Edition
- 2025 Horizon Action Plan: Supporting Agency, Trust, Transparency, and Involvement
- 2025 Horizon Action Plan: Mental Health Supports
- 2024 Horizon Action Plan: Unified Data Models
- 2024 Horizon Report: Cybersecurity & Privacy Edition
- 2024 Horizon Report: Teaching & Learning Edition
- 2023 Horizon Action Plan: Data Governance
- 2023 Horizon Action Plan: Generative AI
- 2023 Horizon Report: Holistic Student Experience Edition
- 2023 Horizon Report: Teaching & Learning Edition
- 2022 Horizon Action Plan: Hybrid Learning
- 2022 Horizon Report: Data & Analytics Edition
- 2022 Horizon Report: Teaching & Learning Edition
- 2021 Horizon Action Plan: Privacy
- 2021 Horizon Report: Teaching & Learning Edition
- 2021 Horizon Report: Information Security Edition
- 2020 Horizon Report: Teaching & Learning Edition
- 2019 Horizon Report
- Horizon Report Preview 2019
- 2018 NMC Horizon Report
- NMC Horizon Report Preview 2018
- Digital Literacy in Higher Education, Part II: An NMC Horizon Project Strategic Brief
- 2017 Horizon Report
- Horizon Report: K-12 Edition, 2009-2017
- Horizon Report: Library Edition, 2014-2017
- Horizon Report: Museum Edition, 2010-2016
- 2016 Horizon Report
- 2015 Horizon Report
- Horizon Report Europe: 2014 Schools Edition
- 2014 Horizon Report
- 2013 Horizon Report
- 2012 Horizon Report
- 2011 Horizon Report
- Horizon Report 2010: Iberoamerican Edition
- Horizon Report: Australia-New Zealand Edition, 2008 - 2010
- 2010 Horizon Report
- Horizon Report: 2009 Economic Development Edition
- 2009 Horizon Report
- 2008 Horizon Report
- 2007 Horizon Report
- 2006 Horizon Report
- 2005 Horizon Report
