= Lawrence Johnson =

Lawrence Johnson may refer to:

- Lawrence Johnson (pole vaulter) (born 1974), American pole-vaulter
- Lawrence Alexander Sidney Johnson (1925–1997), Australian botanist
- Lawrence Johnson (American football) (born 1957), former NFL cornerback with the Cleveland Browns and Buffalo Bills
- Lawrence Johnson (type-founder) (1801–1860), American type-founder
- Lawrence Johnson (Wisconsin politician) (1908–1994), Wisconsin Republican politician
- Lawrence H. Johnson (1862–1947), Minnesota Republican politician
- Birth name of Laurence Naismith (1908–1992), English actor
- L.O. Johnson (Lawrence Johnson, born 1999), American sprinter

== See also ==
- Laurence Johnson (disambiguation)
- Larry Johnson (disambiguation)
- Lawrence Johnston (disambiguation)
