= Oshkosh Public Museum =

Historic house in Wisconsin, United States

- Edgar Sawyer House
- U.S. Historic district – Contributing property
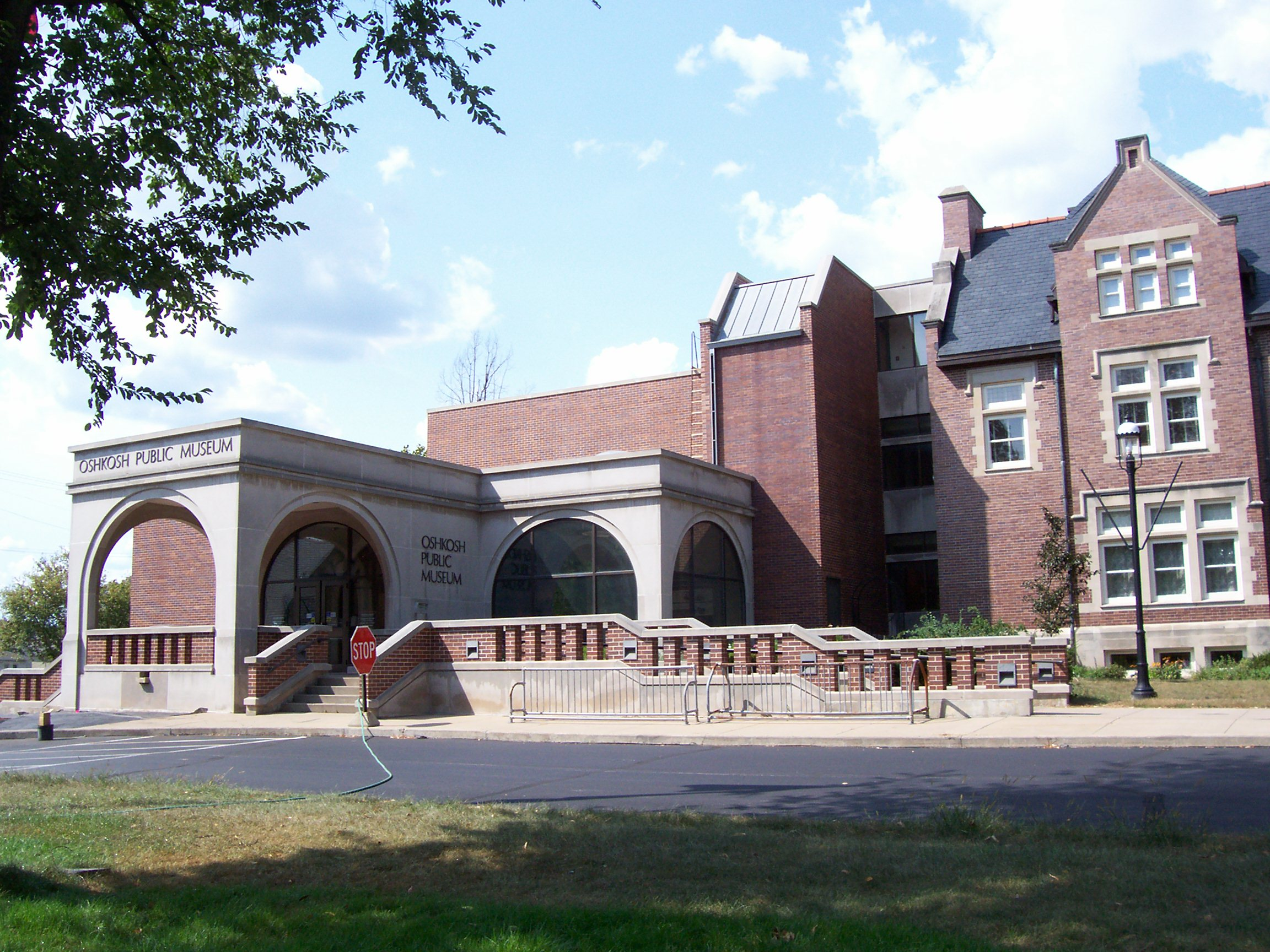

- Location within Wisconsin Location within the United States
- Interactive map showing the location of Oshkosh Public Museum
- Location: 1331 Algoma Boulevard; Oshkosh, Wisconsin 54901
- Coordinates: 44.03362°N 88.55823°W
- Built: 1908
- Architect: William Waters
- Architectural style: Tudor Revival
- Part of: Algoma Boulevard Historic District (ID94001368)
- Added to NRHP: 1994

The Oshkosh Public Museum is museum located in Oshkosh, Wisconsin, United States. It is housed in the Edgar and Mary Jewell Sawyer House, which is part of the Algoma Boulevard Historic District, and listed on the National Register of Historic Places.

== History ==
Edgar Sawyer, a lumber baron, built the house in 1908. The current mansion is built on the site of the Sawyer's previous home. The original home was demolished in 1907 to make way for a more grand and modern mansion. The Sawyers only lived in the new house for about a year before Mary died of heart failure. Edgar kept the residence open for 12 years, but did not live there permanently. The house was donated to the City of Oshkosh in 1922, and opened as a museum in 1924. Many items on display were destroyed in a third floor fire on June 2, 1994.

== Attractions ==
The museum's featured attraction is a folk art clock called the Apostle's Clock. At the top of each hour, music from a Regina music box starts a procession of hand carved Apostles figurines that circle and bow to a figurine of Jesus Christ. The final apostle, Judas Iscariot, is carrying a bag, and he turns away from Jesus.

The interior of the building was designed by Tiffany Studios. There are several stained glass windows and an ornate carved staircase. Rooms display art and contain information and artifacts about Oshkosh and the Lake Winnebago region.

The museum also documents the arrival of immigrants from Eastern Europe into the region. A section entitled "Memories & Dreams" describes the 1830s until 1920s and includes a 1913 Harley Davidson motorcycle. In a room called "Grandma's Attic" visitors can interact with historic items. A model shows the city and its lumber yards in the 1800s.

== Images ==
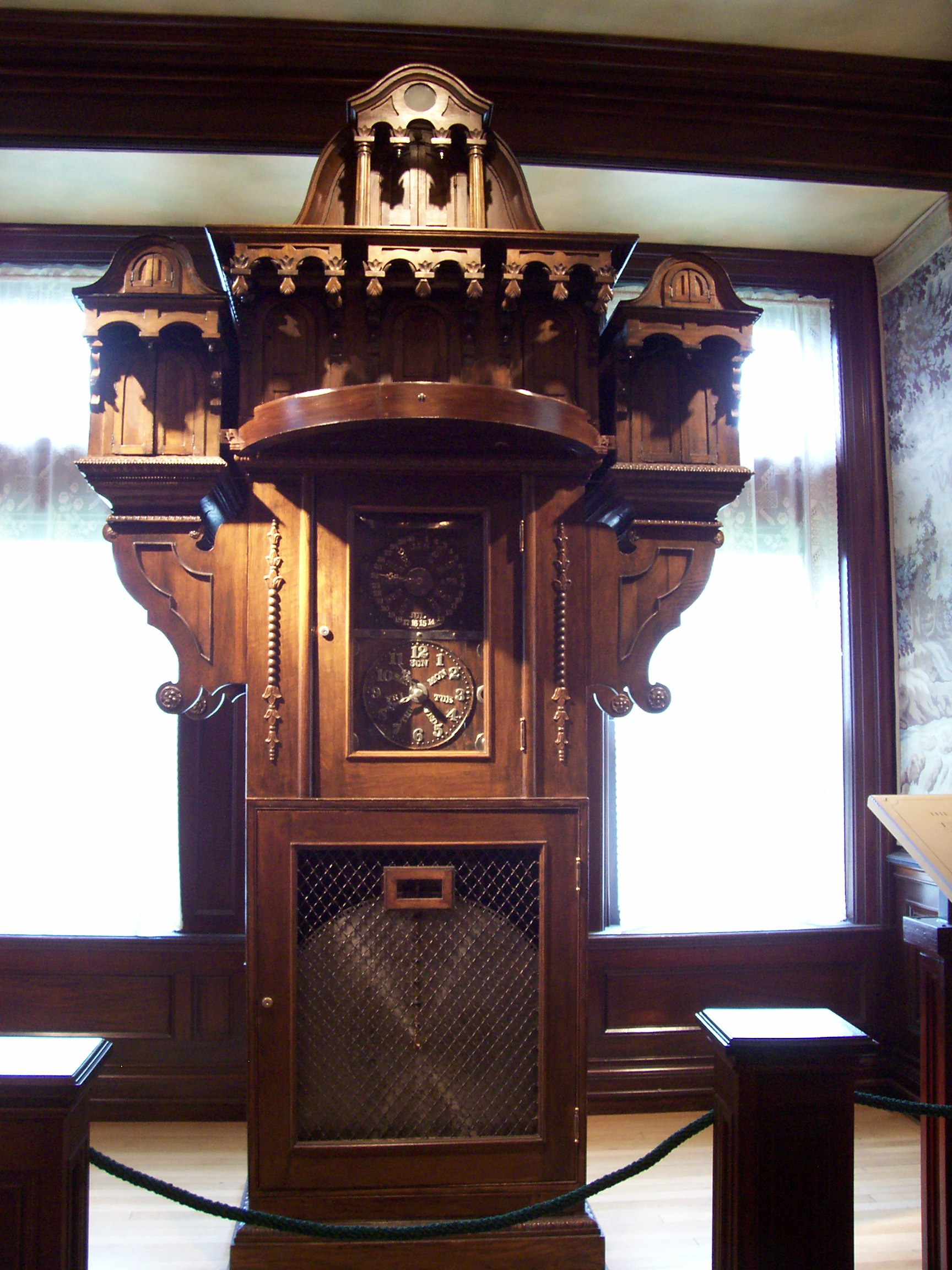
Apostles Clock

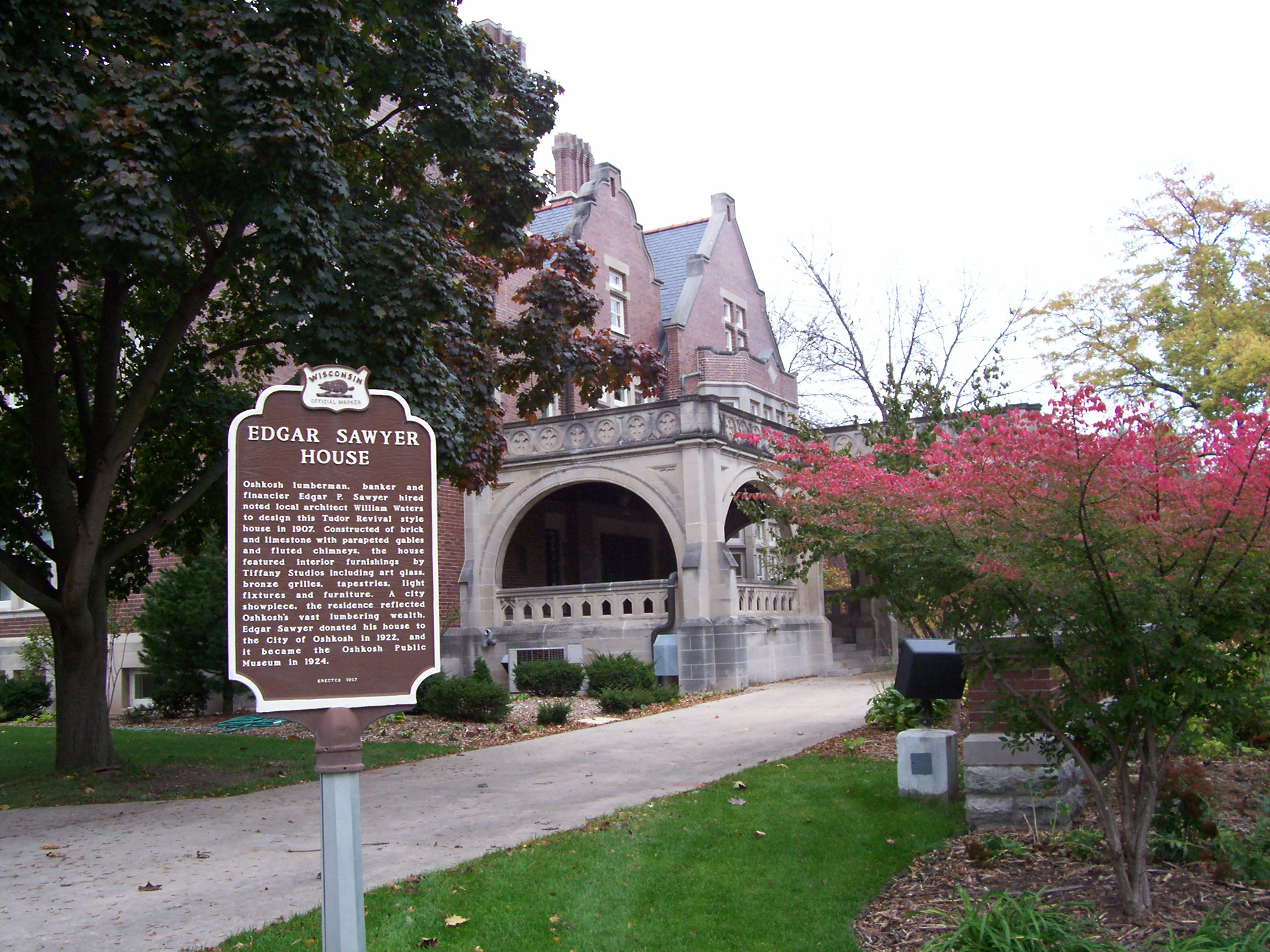
Registered Historic Place sign
