= Oshkosh Grand Opera House =

Theater and movie theater in Oshkosh, Wisconsin, United States

- The Grand
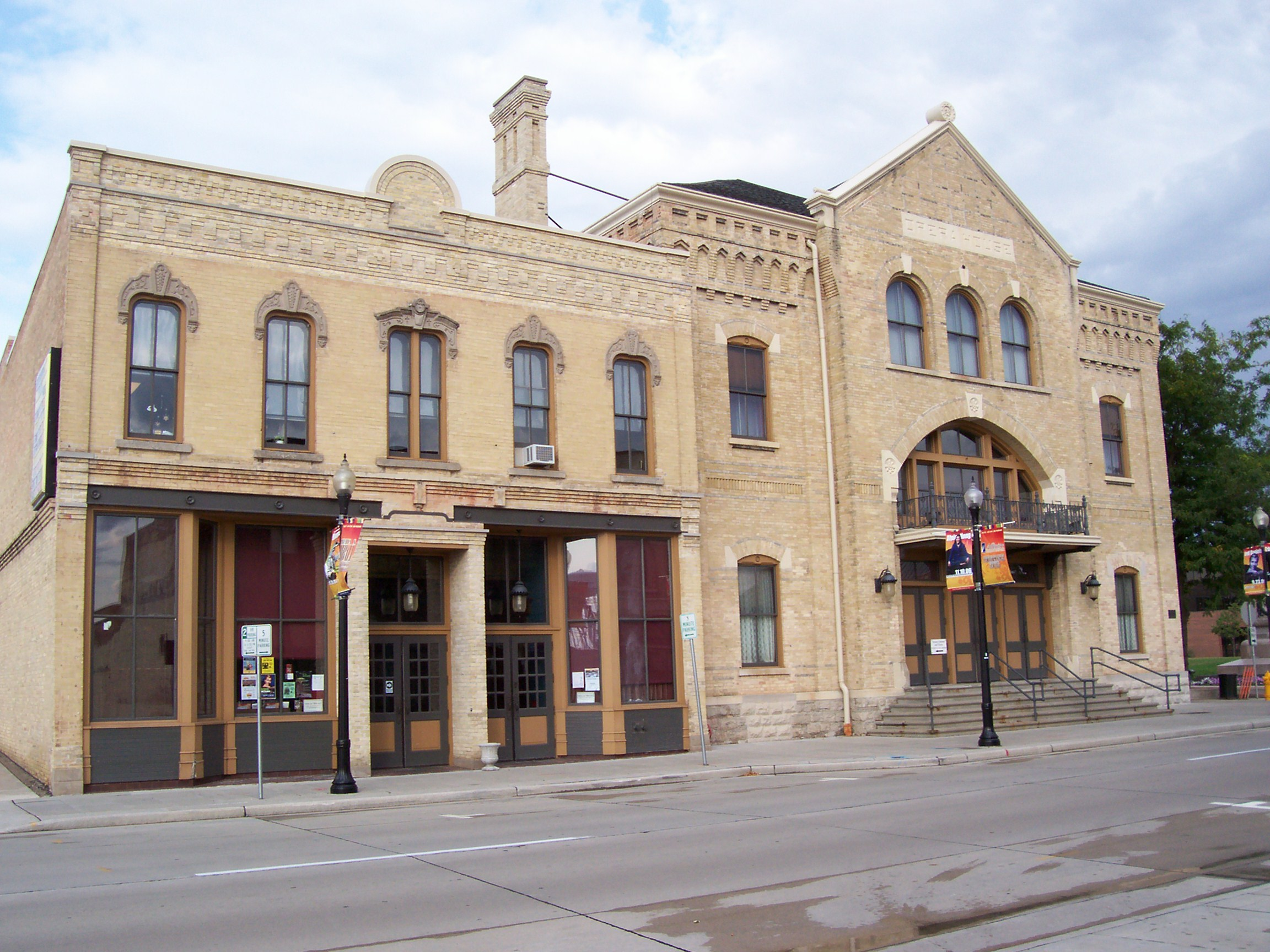
- Exterior in 2006

- Location within Wisconsin Location within the United States
- Former names: Grand Theater (1950-1982)
- Address: 100 High Ave, Oshkosh, Wisconsin 54901
- Coordinates: 44°1′3″N 88°32′18″W
- Owner: City of Oshkosh
- Operator: Oshkosh Opera House Foundation
- Capacity: 550
- Type: Theater
- Public transit: GO Transit

Construction
- Built: 1883
- Opened: August 9, 1883; 143 years ago
- Renovated: 1982-1986; 2009-2010
- Architect: William Waters

Website
- thegrandoshkosh.org
- Oshkosh Grand Opera House
- U.S. National Register of Historic Places
- Area: less than one acre
- Built: 1883
- Architect: William Waters
- NRHP reference No.: 74000144
- Added to NRHP: January 21, 1974

The Grand Opera House, commonly referred as The Grand, is a historic opera house located at the corner of High Avenue and Market Street in Oshkosh, Wisconsin, United States. It was built in 1883, designed by William Waters, a local architect, and underwent a major refurbishing in 2009–2010 at an expense of two million dollars. The roof trusses were reinforced, the ceilings were replaced, and a large chandelier was repaired. Additionally a new "Grand Lounge" was added for improved audience services and to smaller events. Today, the opera house seats 550, hosts nearly 100 public performances a year including community and repertory theater, symphony orchestra, corporate meetings and weddings; it is operated by the non-profit Oshkosh Opera House foundation. The theater was listed on the National Register of Historic Places in 1974.
