= Fox Valley Technical College =

Public college in Grand Chute, Wisconsin, US

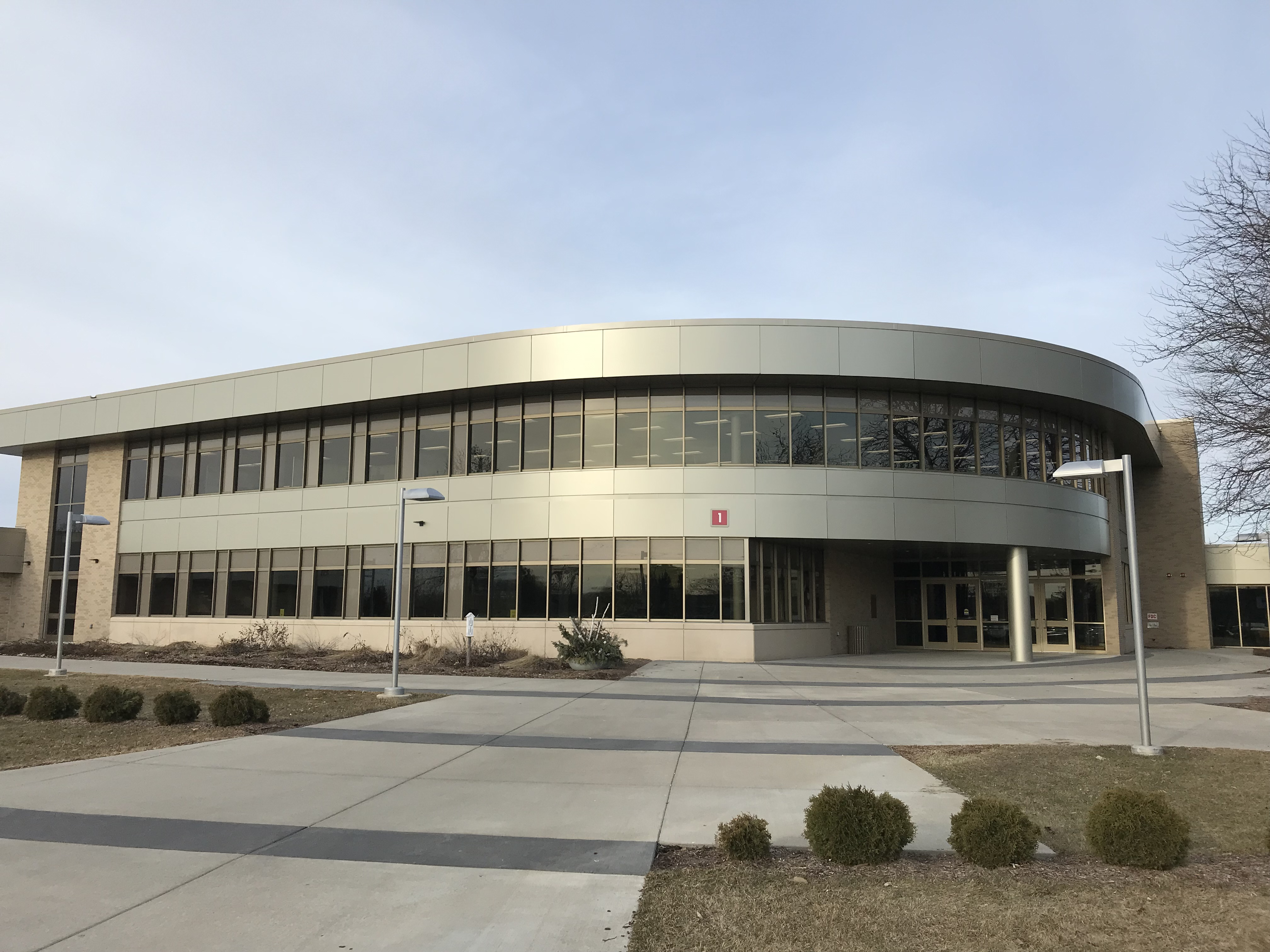
- Motto: Knowledge that Works
- Type: Public technical college
- Established: 1912, 1967
- Parent institution: Wisconsin Technical College System
- President: Chris Matheny
- Students: About 50,000
- Location: Grand Chute, Wisconsin, U.S.
- Campus: Urban
- Nickname: Foxes
- Mascot: Sly Fox
- Website: www.fvtc.edu

Fox Valley Technical College (Fox Valley Tech or FVTC) is a public technical college in Grand Chute, Wisconsin. It is a member of the Wisconsin Technical College System and serves people in the Appleton, Wisconsin/Fox Cities area. It serves about 50,000 people each year and offers more than 200 associate degree, technical diploma, and certificate programs as well as instruction related to 20 apprenticeship trades. It has credit transfer agreements with more than 30 four-year colleges and universities.

The main campus is in Grand Chute with a second campus in Oshkosh. FVTC has smaller regional centers in Chilton, Clintonville, Waupaca, and Wautoma. It also operates a Public Safety Training Center in Greenville.

== History ==
Starting in 1912, city vocational schools were formed at six locations (Appleton, Brillion, Kaukauna, Menasha, Neenah, and Oshkosh) in the current district. In 1967, the Wisconsin Legislature divided the state into sixteen districts, which led to the formation of Fox Valley Technical Institute (FVTI).

In 1987, the college (along with all of the state technical colleges) was renamed and it became known as Fox Valley Technical College.

=== Key dates in FVTC history ===
1912
City vocational schools organized in Appleton, Brillion, Kaukauna, Menasha, Neenah, and Oshkosh
1967
Fox Valley Technical Institute (FVTI) established by the Wisconsin Legislature
1968
Held first public referendum
1972
FVTI opened its main campus at 1825 N. Bluemound Drive in Appleton, WI.
1976
FVTI Foundation Inc. established
1978
Wautoma Regional Center opened
1979
Clintonville Regional Center opened
1981
Chilton Regional Center opened
1982
Oshkosh Riverside Campus opened at 150 N. Campbell Road
1983
Neenah Regional Center opened
1987
Name changed to Fox Valley Technical College (FVTC)
D.J. Bordini Center opened
1993
Waupaca Regional Center opened
1994
"Knowledge That Works" became the college's slogan
1998
Held public referendum
2012
Held public referendum
2015
Public Safety Training Center opened in Greenville

=== Presidents ===
- William M. Sirek, college's inception in 1967 – June 30, 1982
- Dr. Stanley J. Spanbauer, July 1, 1982 – June 30, 1993
- Dr. H. Victor Baldi, July 1, 1993 – December 31, 1999
- Dr. Laurence F. Johnson, July 1, 2000 – June 22, 2001
- James Milslagle, June 25, 2001 – December 31, 2001
- Dr. David L. Buettner, January 7, 2002 – August 15, 2008
- Dr. Susan A. May, July 1, 2008 – July 31, 2021
- Dr. Chris Matheny, August 1, 2021 – Present

== Accreditation ==
FVTC is accredited by the Higher Learning Commission. FVTC has been accredited by this accreditor since 1970.

== Special programs and facilities ==
=== Public Safety Training Center ===
In 2015, FVTC opened their Public Safety Training Center in Greenville on the south end of Appleton International Airport. The center contains multiple state of the art simulators as well as a mock town to train students enrolled in the school's public safety programs. The center has a Boeing 727 which was donated by FedEx Express. The facility is also used frequently by public safety agencies all over the United States for their regular training. Pierce Manufacturing also uses the center to test out their new fire apparatus.

In October 2018, FVTC started work on a $10.4 million expansion of the center which is being funded by the Federal Aviation Administration. The expansion will add facilities for aircraft firefighting training which will be used by aircraft rescue and firefighting personal from airports across the United States.

=== Flight school ===
FVTC has an FAA certified flight school offering pilot training, Aircraft maintenance technician (A&P), and aircraft electronics programs. The school is located in Oshkosh on the eastern edge of Wittman Regional Airport.

=== Ione's Dining Room ===
FVTC's Appleton campus houses Ione's, a student-operated "full-service fine dining room and a premier learning lab for Culinary Arts students." The department of Culinary, Hotel and Restaurant Management had wanted to remodel the dining room and a 2002 gift from Ione Berg helped bring the goal to fruition. "Restaurant Operations, the course that is housed in Ione's Dining Room, is the capstone course of the College's Culinary Arts program. Students are expected to bring their skills together there, including all the cooking components, as well as management and leadership."

== Images ==
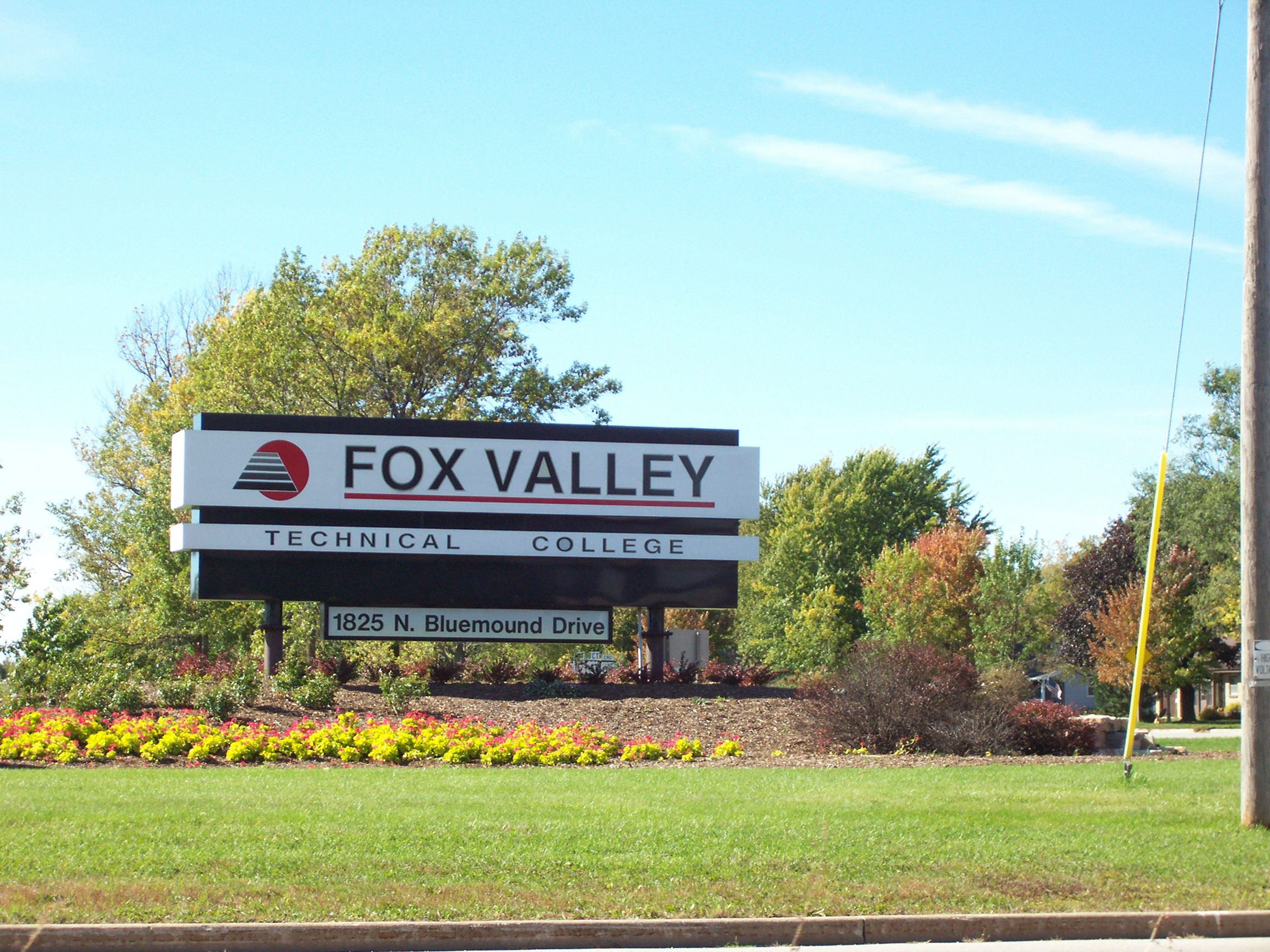
Road sign (Now replaced with a new sign)

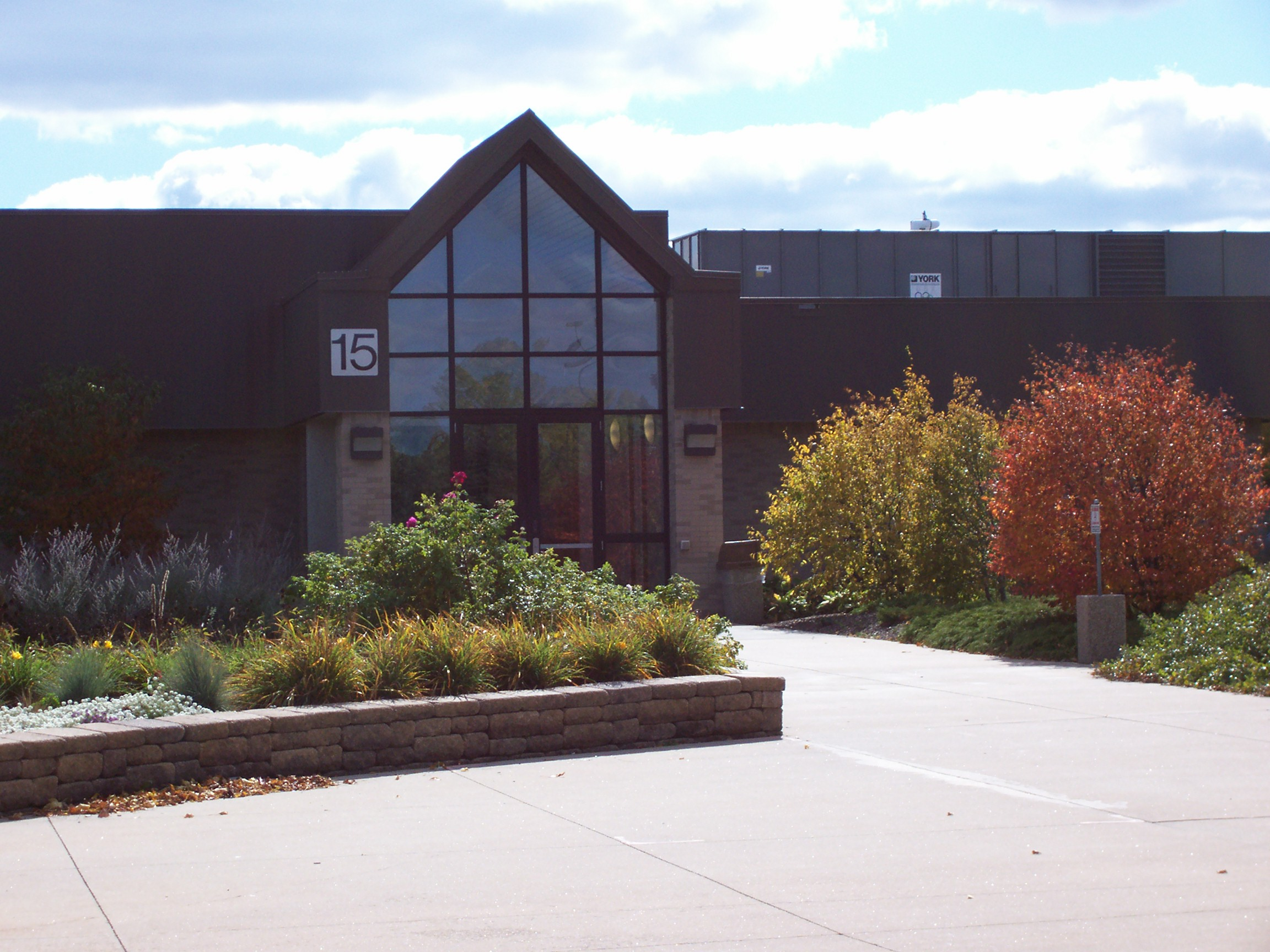
Appleton campus north entrance

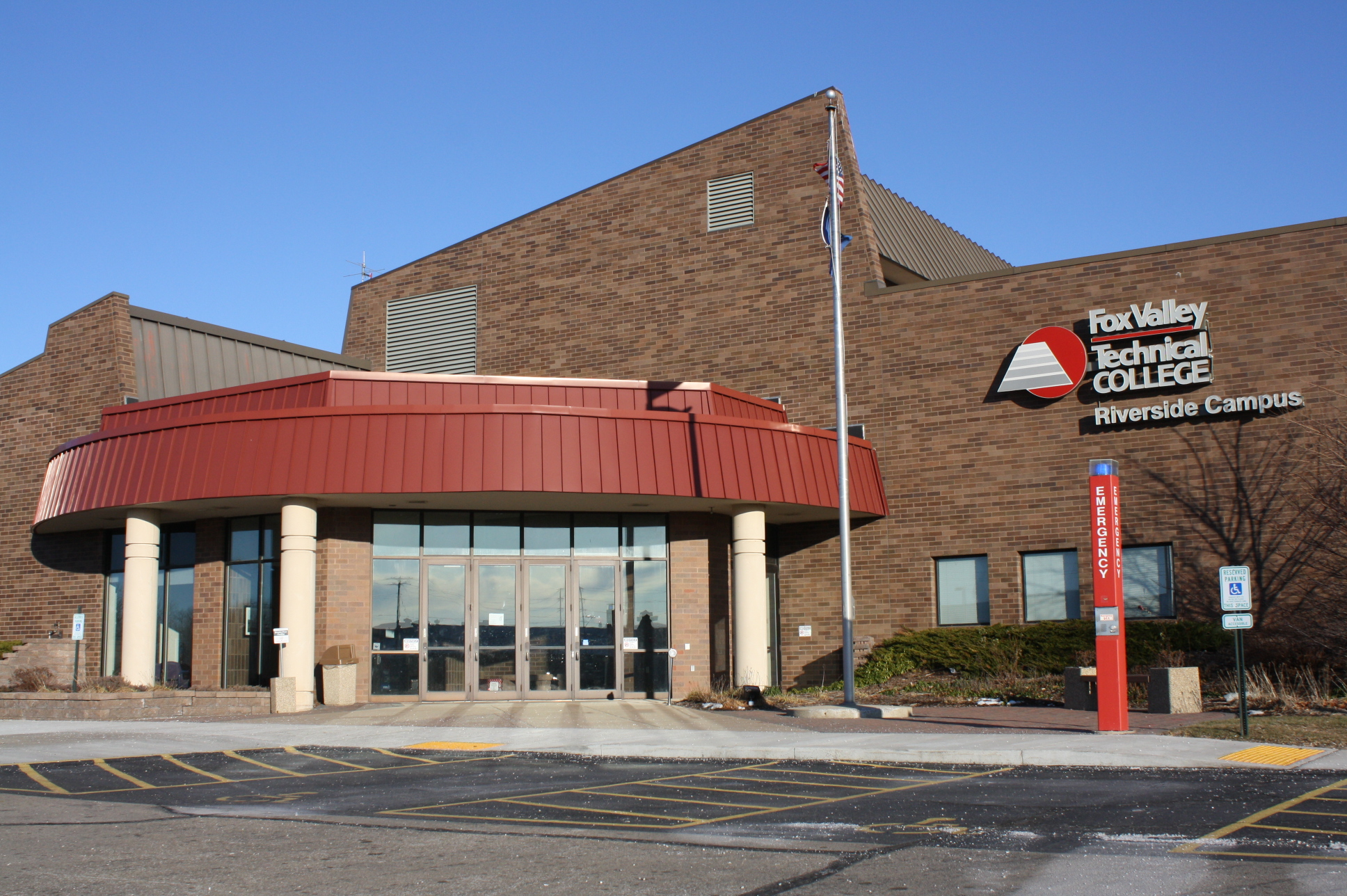
Oshkosh campus

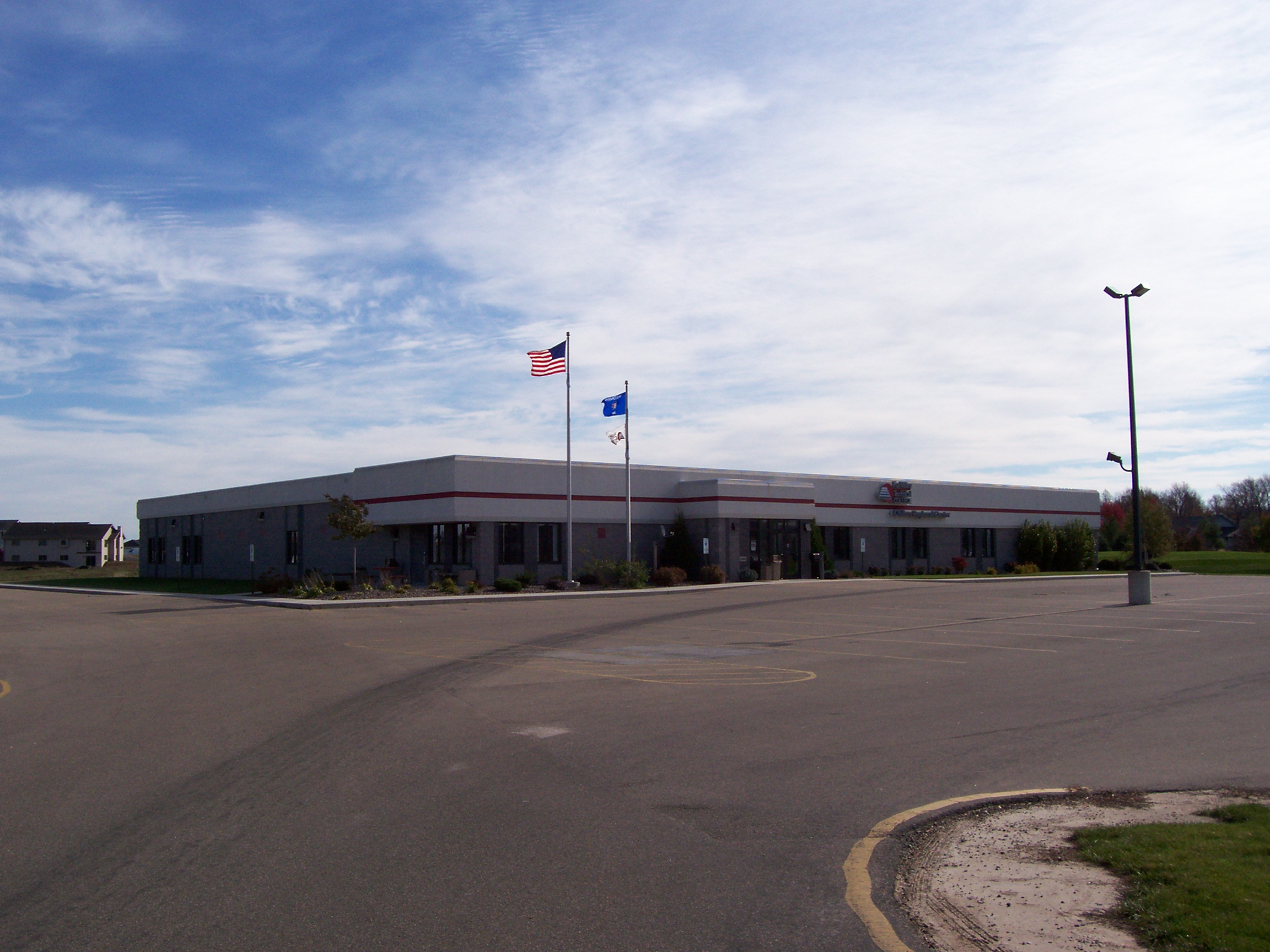
Chilton regional center

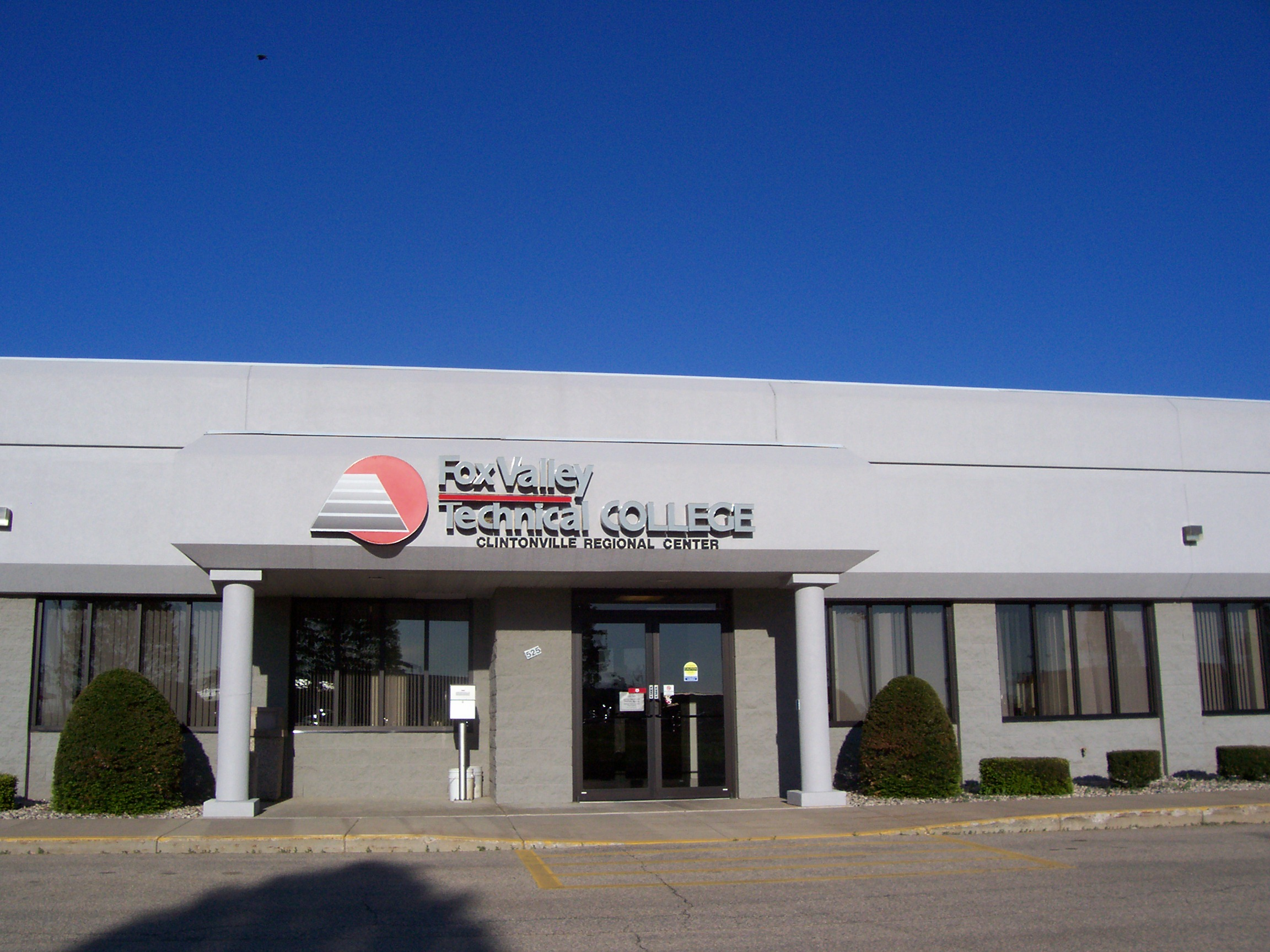
Clintonville regional center

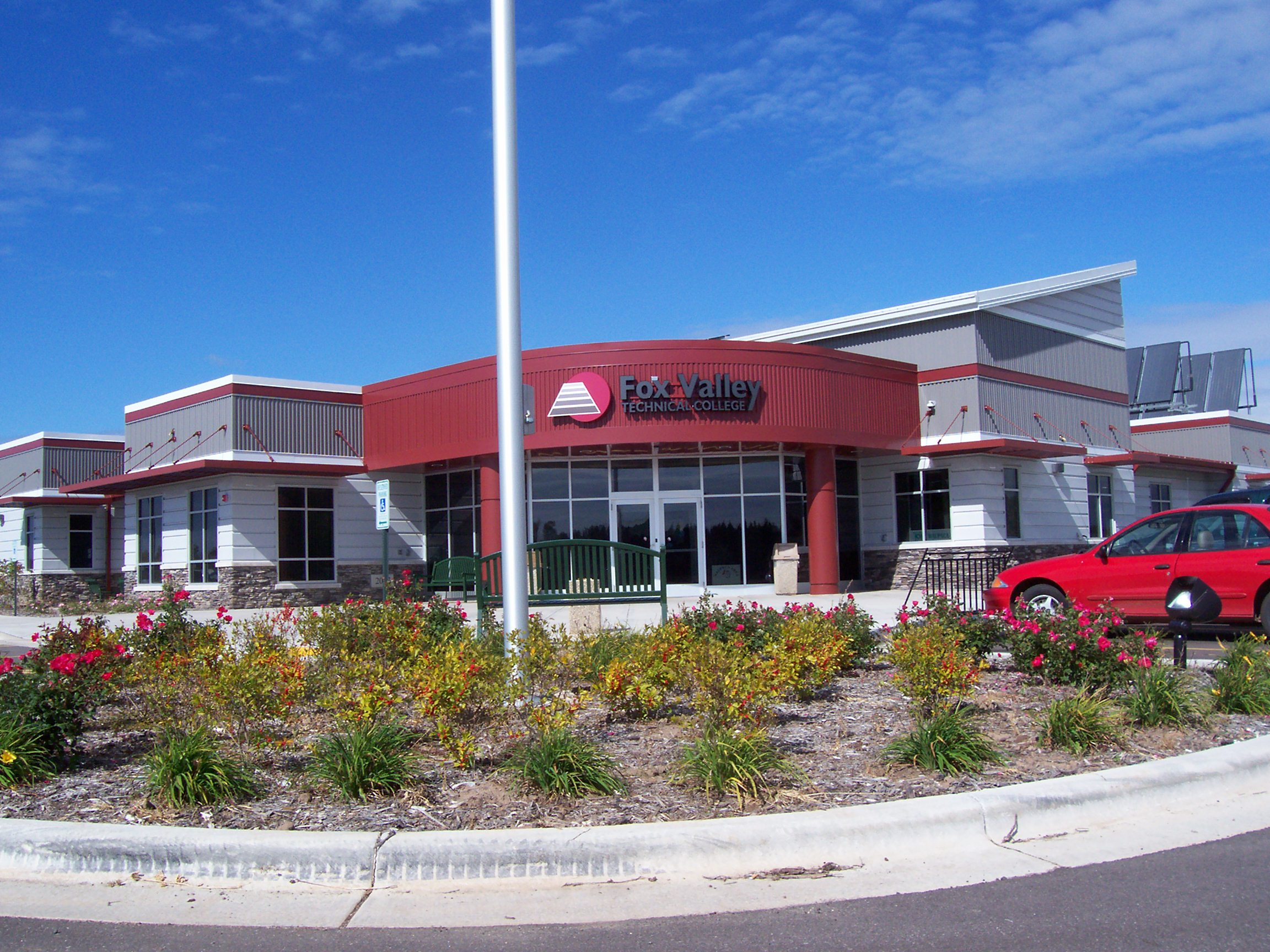
Waupaca regional center
