= Journal of Diagnostic Medical Sonography =

- Discipline: Diagnostic imaging, Sonographer
- Language: English
- Edited by: Dr. Kevin Evans, PhD, RT, RDMS, RVS, FSDMS, FAIUM

Publication details
- History: 1985-present
- Publisher: SAGE Publications on behalf of the Society of Diagnostic Medical Sonography
- Frequency: Bimonthly
- Open access: Yes, after 12 months
- Impact factor: 0.4 (2024)

Standard abbreviations
- ISO 4: J. Diagn. Med. Sonogr.

Indexing
- ISSN: 8756-4793 (print); 1552-5430 (web)
- OCLC no.: 535496115

Links
- Journal homepage; Current issue; Online archive

The Journal of Diagnostic Medical Sonography (JDMS) is the bimonthly, peer-reviewed medical journal of the Society of Diagnostic Medical Sonography (SDMS), and has been in publication since 1985. JDMS publishes peer-reviewed manuscripts supporting the translational use of medical ultrasound for diagnosis, intervention, and other clinical applications by a sonographer, sonologist, or other health care provider. The JDMS provides research, clinical, and educational content for all specialties, including but not limited to abdominal, women's health, pediatric, cardiovascular, musculoskeletal, and other emerging sonography practice areas. The journal's scope also includes research on instrumentation, physics, and technical advancements of ultrasonography, as well as research on sonographer education and other professional issues, including ergonomics and the prevention of work-related injuries.

JDMS accepts Original Research, Literature Reviews, Case Studies, Symposia (related to education, policy, technology, or professional issues), and Letters to the Editor. Author resources, editorial board information, and subscription and advertising opportunities are available on the SDMS website.

== Abstracting and indexing ==
The Journal of Diagnostic Medical Sonography received its first impact factor listed within the Journal Citation Reports in 2022. The journal is also abstracted and indexed in:

- CINAHL
- Clarivate Analytics: Emerging Sources Citation Index (ESCI)
- EMBASE/Excerpta Medica
- InfoTrac (full text)
- Scopus

== Past Editors-In-Chief ==
Editor	Years served
Mimi Berman-Sandler	1985–1986
Dale Cyr	1987–1990
Jean Lea Spitz	1991–1995
Julia A. Drose	1996–2000
Jean Lea Spitz	2001–2005
S. Michelle Bierig	2006–2011
Phillip J. Bendick	2012–2016
Kevin D. Evans	2017–present
