= Laurence F. Johnson =

American futurist, author, and educator (born 1950)

Larry Johnson speaking at the World Innovation Summit on Education, Nov. 18, 2009

Larry Johnson (born December 17, 1950, in Corpus Christi, Texas) is an American futurist, author, and educator. Johnson is the founder and CEO of EdFutures.org, an international think tank, and as a Senior Fellow of the Center for Digital Education. From 2001 to 2016, he was chief executive officer of the New Media Consortium an international consortium of hundreds of universities, colleges, museums, research centers, and technology companies.

== Contributions ==
The annual Horizon Report was the most visible component of the Horizon Project, which Johnson founded and led from its inception in 2002 until 2016. The report was one of the leading tools used by senior executives in universities and museums to set priorities for technology planning in those years in more than 160 countries.

For nearly 15 years as chief executive officer of the NMC, Johnson provided leadership in areas of strategic planning; program development; fundraising; partnerships with business and industry; the development and management of fiscal and human resources; and policy. During this time, the New Media Consortium (NMC) became an international not-for-profit consortium of learning-focused organizations dedicated to the exploration and use of new media and technologies. Many of the consortium's member institutions constitute a list of colleges and universities around the world, as well as museums, research centers, and companies. During Johnson's time as the chief executive officer, the consortium and its members explored potential applications of emerging technologies for learning, research, and creative inquiry. The consortium's Horizon Reports, which Johnson founded and directed for more than a decade, are regarded as timely and authoritative sources of information on new and emerging technologies available to education anywhere.

Johnson has organized summits and large-scale projects around topics such as Visual literacy, learning objects, educational gaming, the future of scholarship, and the 3D web.

In April 2008, Johnson presented testimony to the House Subcommittee on Telecommunications and the Internet on the nature and state of virtual worlds.

An author of several books, numerous chapters, dozens of articles, and principal investigator for several important national and international studies, he has been recognized for his research by the American Association of Community Colleges and the American Association of University Administrators.

In addition to his work in education, Johnson is an accomplished photographer whose work for Playboy and the "Shoot The Centerfold" seminars has earned international recognition. Johnson achieved this recognition while he was also CEO of the New Media Consortium. In the article profiling the "Shoot the Centerfold" seminar students, Johnson was singled out for special praise: His work photographing nude model Ksenia Pilulka resulted in a featured pictorial in the August, 2017 international issue of Playboy. Asked about his future plans, Johnson said "I’d love to work with any of Victoria’s Secret models on a crazy fashion thing. That would be so much fun!"

== Background ==
In 2016, Johnson marked 35 years of service in higher education, and is the Founder and CEO of EdFutures.org, an international think tank, and as a Senior Fellow of the Center for Digital Education. From 2001 to 2016, he served as CEO of the New Media Consortium. He previously was president and CEO of Fox Valley Technical College, a community college for more than 20,000 FTE in Appleton, Wisconsin. His experiential base includes work at both small and large institutions and positions at every level and across all the major areas of college and university work.

Between 1993 and 1996, he was vice president for the League for Innovation in the Community College, working at the national level to take the story of community colleges to governmental, foundation, and corporate leaders across the country. As director of the League's Information Technology Initiative, he coordinated what was at the time the world's largest higher education technology conference, The International Conference of Information Technology.

He has been on a number of boards, including his current role on the governing board of the Institute for Learning Innovation and the Leadership Advisory Board of the Center for Learning Innovation and Customized Knowledge Solutions in Dubai. Previously he was an advisor to the United Nations Educational, Scientific, and Cultural Organization (UNESCO), on the NMC Board of Directors, the Adobe Systems Higher Education Advisory Board, the Advanced Defense Learning Initiative National Advisory Board, the virtual International Spaceflight Museum, and the Academic Commons Board of Directors.

== Education ==
- Harvard Institute for Educational Management, 1998, Harvard University. Postdoctoral study of leadership issues in higher education.
- Executive Leadership Institute, 1995, The University of Texas at Austin, in collaboration with the League for Innovation in the Community College. Postdoctoral study of leadership issues in community colleges.
- Doctor of Philosophy in Educational Administration, 1993, Community College Leadership Program The University of Texas at Austin Dissertation: “Relationship of Performance in Developmental Mathematics to Academic Success in College-Level Algebra.”
- Master of Business Administration in Finance, 1988, Southwest Texas State University Thesis: “The Evolution of Asset Pricing Theory.”
- Bachelor of Arts in mathematics, with a minor in computer science, 1975, University of Texas at Austin.

== Recognitions ==
- Distinguished Graduate, The University of Texas at Austin, 2000
- American Association of Community Colleges Sloan Research Award, 1997
- American Association of University Administrators Goodman-Malamuth Research Award, 1994

== Selected keynote addresses ==
- The 2011 Horizon Report: Museum Edition. ATHENA Project Closing Conference, Rome, April 28, 2011
- The Horizon Project Navigator. 2011 HP Catalyst Worldwide Summit, New Delhi, India, March 10, 2011
- Generations. National Association of College Stores, Houston, February 25, 2011
- 2011 Horizon Report. EDUCAUSE Learning Initiative Conference. Washington, DC. February 14, 2011.
- Generations. Education World Forum, Ministerial Exchange Keynote With Martin Bean, Pro Vice Chancellor, Open University, London, January 11, 2010
- Generations. Educa Online Berlin. Berlin, Germany. December 3, 2010
- Through the Lens, Darkly. Museum Computer Network. Austin, Texas. October 28, 2010
- Seven Channels of Change. SingTel i.luminate. Singapore. September 21, 2010
- The Horizon Report: Iberoamerican Edition. Virtual Educa. Santo Domingo, Dominican Republic. June 24, 2010
- Siete Canales de Cambio. Virtual Educa. Santo Domingo, Dominican Republic. June 24, 2010
- Seven Ways Technology is Unfolding, Everywhere We Look. 13th Annual Conference on Electronic Theses and Dissertations. Austin, Texas. June 16, 2010
- The Horizon Project Metatrends. Open University of Japan Faculty Convocation. Tokyo. May 24, 2010
- Seven Things Impacting Technology: Horizon Metatrends 2010. University of Texas Leadership Forum. UT Austin. May 19, 2010
- Education Futures (Keynote Panel). Collab Tech Summit Case Western University. Cleveland, Ohio. May 6, 2010
- Seven Channels of Change. 11th Annual CiTE conference. Denver, Colorado. April 12, 2010
- Seven Ways Technology is Unfolding, Everywhere We Loo. Educational Technology Showcase. Baylor University. April 7, 2010
- Into the Rabbit Hole. GameTech. Orlando. March 31, 2010
- Seven Channels of Change for Museums. Webwise - the IMLS Annual conference. Denver Colorado. March 4, 2010
- Seven Ways Technology is Unfolding, Everywhere We Look. 2010 HP Innovations in Education Worldwide Summit. San Jose, California. February 23, 2010
- Seven Channels of Change. American Council on Education. Washington, DC. February 4, 2010
- The 2010 Horizon Report. EDUCAUSE Learning Initiative Conference. Austin, Texas. January 19, 2010
- Seven Ways Technology is Unfolding, Everywhere We Look. Learning and Technology World Forum. London. January 12, 2010
- Seven Ways Technology is Unfolding, Everywhere We Look. Victorian Instructional Technology Teachers Association. Melbourne, Australia. November 23, 2009
- Future Scenarios. World Innovation Summit for Education (WISE). Doha Qatar. November 18, 2009
- El Informe Horizon. Faculty Convocation at the Universitat Oberta de Catalunya. Barcelona, Spain. October 16, 2009
- Seven Ways Technology is Changing Everything. National Broadband Network Symposium. Brisbane Australia. September 25, 2009
- Seven Things Impacting Technology: Horizon Metatrends 2009. St Edward's University Leadership Forum. Austin, Texas. Aug 31, 2009
- Educational Leaders Forum: Seven Channels of Change. UNESCO World Congress on Higher Education. Paris, France. July 9, 2009
- Seven Channels of Change. University of Texas Leadership Forum. Austin, Texas. May 19, 2009
- Horizon Metatrends 2009. Collab Tech Case Western University. Cleveland, Ohio. May 7, 2009
- Seven Channels of Change. USC Teaching with Technology Conference. University of Southern California. May 5, 2009
- The Horizon Metatrends. Keynote address to the annual ACM Special interest Group on University and College Computing Services. Portland, Oregon. October 19, 2008.
- From 30,000 Feet: The Horizon Project at Five Years. Vision 2020: Digital Ubiquity & University Transformation. Cincinnati OH, August 6, 2008
- Down the Rabbit Hole: The NMC's Journey into Virtual Worlds. Alliance for Information Science and Technology Innovation (AISTI) Annual Mini-Conference. Santa Fe, NM, May 12–14, 2008
- Horizon Project Metatrends. 2008 Eduserve Foundation Symposium; London, UK, May 8–9, 2008.
- Thru the Looking Glass: Why virtual worlds matter, where they are heading, and why we are all here. Federal Virtual Worlds Expo. Washington, DC, April 23–24, 2008.
- Social Networking, the “Third Place,” and the Evolution of Communication. 2008 Teaching in Community Colleges Conference; April 15, 2008 .
- Why Virtual Worlds? Association for Managers of Innovation Virtual Conference, hosted by the University of the Pacific; April 15, 2008 via Second Life.
- Creativity Matters. Address to the faculty of the New Orleans Center for Creative Arts; New Orleans, LA, April 16–18, 2008

== Selected publications ==
- Laurence F. Johnson, Holly Witchey (2010). The 2010 Horizon Report: Museum Edition, Curator: The Museum Journal, Volume 54, Issue 1, pages 37–40, January 2011
- Johnson, Laurence F. (2010). Siete Canales de Cambio: Cómo el desarrollo de la tecnología está cambiando, allí donde miremos. Santo Domingo: Virtual Educa.
- Johnson, Laurence F., Smith, Rachel S., Levine, Alan, and Haywood, K. (2010) The 2010 Horizon Report. Austin, TX: The New Media Consortium.
- Johnson, Laurence F., Smith, Rachel S., Levine, Alan, and Haywood, K. (2010) The 2010 Horizon Report: Australian-New Zealand Edition. Austin, TX: The New Media Consortium.
- Johnson, Laurence F., Smith, Rachel S., Levine, Alan, and Haywood, K. The 2010 Horizon Report: K12 Edition. Austin, TX: The New Media Consortium.
- Johnson, Laurence F., Witchey, H., Smith, Rachel S., Levine, Alan, and Haywood, K. The 2010 Horizon Report: Museum Edition. Austin, TX: The New Media Consortium.
- García, I. Peña-López, I; Johnson, L., Smith, R., Levine, A., & Haywood, K. (2010). Informe Horizon: Edición Iberoamericana 2010. Austin, Texas: The New Media Consortium.
- Johnson, Laurence F. (2009) Closing Comments: 2010 Symposium for the Future. Austin, TX: The New Media Consortium.
- Johnson, Laurence F.; Smith, Rachel S.; Smythe, J. Troy; Varon, Rachel K. (2009). Challenge-Based Learning: An Approach for Our Time. Austin, Texas: The New Media Consortium.
- Johnson, Laurence F. (2009) Seven Channels of Change. Berlin: Educa Online.
- Johnson, Laurence F., Smith, Rachel S., and Levine, Alan. (2009) The 2009 Horizon Report. Austin, TX: The New Media Consortium.
- Johnson, Laurence F., Smith, Rachel S., and Levine, Alan. (2009) The 2009 Horizon Report: Australian-New Zealand Edition. Austin, TX: The New Media Consortium.
- Johnson, Laurence F., Smith, Rachel S., and Levine, Alan. (2009) The 2009 Horizon Report: Economic Development Edition. Austin, TX: The New Media Consortium.
- Johnson, Laurence F., Smith, Rachel S., and Levine, Alan. (2009) The 2009 Horizon Report: K12 Edition. Austin, TX: The New Media Consortium.
- Johnson, Laurence F., Smith, Rachel S., and Levine, Alan. (2009) Communique_ from the Open EdTech Summit 2009—A Call to Action. Austin, TX: The New Media Consortium.
- Johnson, Laurence F. (2009) Closing Comments: 2009 Symposium for the Future. Austin, TX: The New Media Consortium.
- Johnson, Laurence F., Smith, Rachel S., and Levine, Alan. Horizon Report: 2008 Australia-New Zealand Edition. Austin, TX: The New Media Consortium, 2008.
- Johnson, Laurence F., Smith, Rachel S., and Levine, Alan. (2009) Horizon Project Metatrends: Seven Long-Term Influences on Educational Technology. Chapter in Guofang Wan & Dianne Gut (Eds.). Bringing Schools into the 21st Century. Dordrecht, the Netherlands: Springer Publishing.
- Johnson, Larry, Samis, P, Smith, R., Varon, R., and Witchey, H. (2008) Into the Breach: How Creative Philanthropy Can Reverse the Eroding Landscape of Arts Education. An NMC White Paper: The New Media Consortium, Austin, Texas. September, 2008.
- Johnson, Larry (2008) Multimedia for Peanuts: The Pachyderm Project at Five. First Monday, 13:8. August 2008.
- Johnson, Laurence F., Online Virtual Worlds: Applications and Avatars in a User-Generated Medium. House Subcommittee on Telecommunications and the Internet, Washington, DC, 2008.
- Johnson, Laurence F. and Levine, Alan H. (2008) Virtual Worlds: Inherently Immersive, Highly Social Learning Spaces, Theory Into Practice, 47:2, 161 – 170.
- Johnson, Laurence F., Smith, Rachel S., and Levine, Alan. The Horizon Report. Austin, TX: The New Media Consortium, 2004, 2005, 2006, 2007, 2008, 2009, 2010, 2011.
- Johnson, Larry. Why Creativity Matters. An NMC Whitepaper. Austin, TX: The New Media Consortium, 2007.
- Johnson, Laurence F. Foreword. In Learning Objects for Instruction: Design and Evaluation by Pamela T. Northrup. Hershey, Pennsylvania: Information Science Publishing, 2007.
- Johnson, Laurence F. and Smith, Rachel S. 2007 Horizon Report: A Call to Scholarship. An NMC Whitepaper. Austin, TX: The New Media Consortium, 2007.
- Samis, Peter, Johnson, Laurence F., and Smith, Rachel S. Pachyderm: From Multimedia to Visual Stories. Journal of Computing in Higher Education, Fall 2007 Vol. 19(1), 3-25.
- Smith, Rachel S. and Johnson, Laurence F. Social Networking, The “Third Place,” and the Evolution of Communication. An NMC Whitepaper. Austin, TX: The New Media Consortium, 2007.
- Johnson, Larry. The Sea Change Before Us. EDUCAUSE Review. Boulder: EDUCAUSE, March/April 2006.
- Johnson, Laurence F and Smith, Rachel S. A Global Imperative: The Report of the 21st Century Literacy Summit. Austin, TX: The New Media Consortium, 2005.
- Johnson, Laurence F. and Samis, Peter S. Taking Teaching by the Tusks: Introducing Pachyderm 2.0. Toronto, Ontario: Archives and Museum Informatics, 2005.
- Johnson, Laurence F. Elusive Vision: Challenges Impeding the Learning Object Economy. Austin, TX: The New Media Consortium, 2003.
- Johnson, Laurence F. “Into the Breach: A National Study of Computers and the At-Risk.” Chapter in Milliron, M.D. and Miles, C.L., Editors. Taking a Big Picture Look @ Technology, Learning, & the Community College. Mission Viejo, California: League for Innovation in the Community College, 2000.
- Roueche, John E., Johnson, Laurence F., and Roueche, Suanne D. Embracing the Tiger: The Institutional Effectiveness Debate in the Community College. Washington, D.C.: Community College Press, 1997.
- Johnson, Larry. “Computers and At Risk Students: A National Study of Successful Strategies for Developmental Students.” Lead Chapter in Core Issues in Community Colleges. Washington, D.C.: American Association of Community Colleges, 1997.
- Roueche, John E., Johnson, Laurence F., and Roueche, Suanne D. “Writing the Tale of the Institutional Effectiveness Tiger.” Southern Association of Community, Junior, and Technical Colleges Occasional Paper. Vol. 15, No. 1, September 1997.
- Roueche, John E., Johnson, Laurence F., and Roueche, Suanne D. “Embracing the Tiger: The Institutional Effectiveness Challenge.” Leadership Abstracts. Vol. 10, no. 8, August, 1997.
- Roueche, John E., Johnson, Laurence F., and Roueche, Suanne D. “Embracing the Institutional Effectiveness Tiger.” Community College Journal. Vol. 67, No. 5, April/May 1997.
- Johnson, Larry, Lever-Duffy, Judy, and Lemke, Randall, Editors. Learning Without Limits: Distance Learning in the Community College. Mission Viejo, California: League for Innovation in the Community College, 1996.
- Johnson, Laurence F., “Relationship of Performance in Developmental Mathematics to Academic Success in College-Level Algebra.” Community College Journal of Research and Practice. Vol. 20, No. 4, June, 1996.
- Johnson, Larry, Editor. Common Ground: Exemplary Community College and Corporate Partnerships. Mission Viejo, California: League for Innovation in the Community College, 1996.
- Johnson, Larry and LaBello, Sharon, Editors. The 21st Century Community College: Technology and the New Learning Paradigm. Tallahassee, Florida: International Business Machines Corporation, 1996.
- Johnson, Larry, “Regarding Technology.” Leadership Abstracts. Vol. 8, no. 11, November, 1995.
- Johnson, Larry, “Regarding the Perfectly Technological Chair” Academic Leadership. Journal of the National Chair Academy. Vol. 3, no. 1, October, 1995.
- Johnson, Larry, “Does all this Technology make a Difference?” Innovation Abstracts. September, 1994.
- Roueche, John and Larry Johnson. “A New View of the Mission of Higher Education,” Leadership Abstracts, Vol. 7, No. 1, January, 1994.
- Johnson, Laurence F., “Relationship of Performance in Developmental Mathematics to Academic Success in College-Level Algebra.” Doctoral Dissertation, The University of Texas at Austin, 1993.
- Dubose, Terry, James Cunyus, and Laurence Johnson, “Embryonic Heart Rate and Age,” Journal of Diagnostic Medical Sonography, Vol. 6, May/June 1990.
