= Laurie Johnson (disambiguation) =

Laurie Johnson was a film music composer.

Laurie Johnson can also refer to:

- Laurie Johnson (cricketer), a West-Indies-born cricketer
- Laurie Johnson (rugby union), an Australian rugby union player

== See also ==
- Laurence Johnson
