= Oshkosh, Wisconsin =

City in Winnebago County, Wisconsin, US

- City
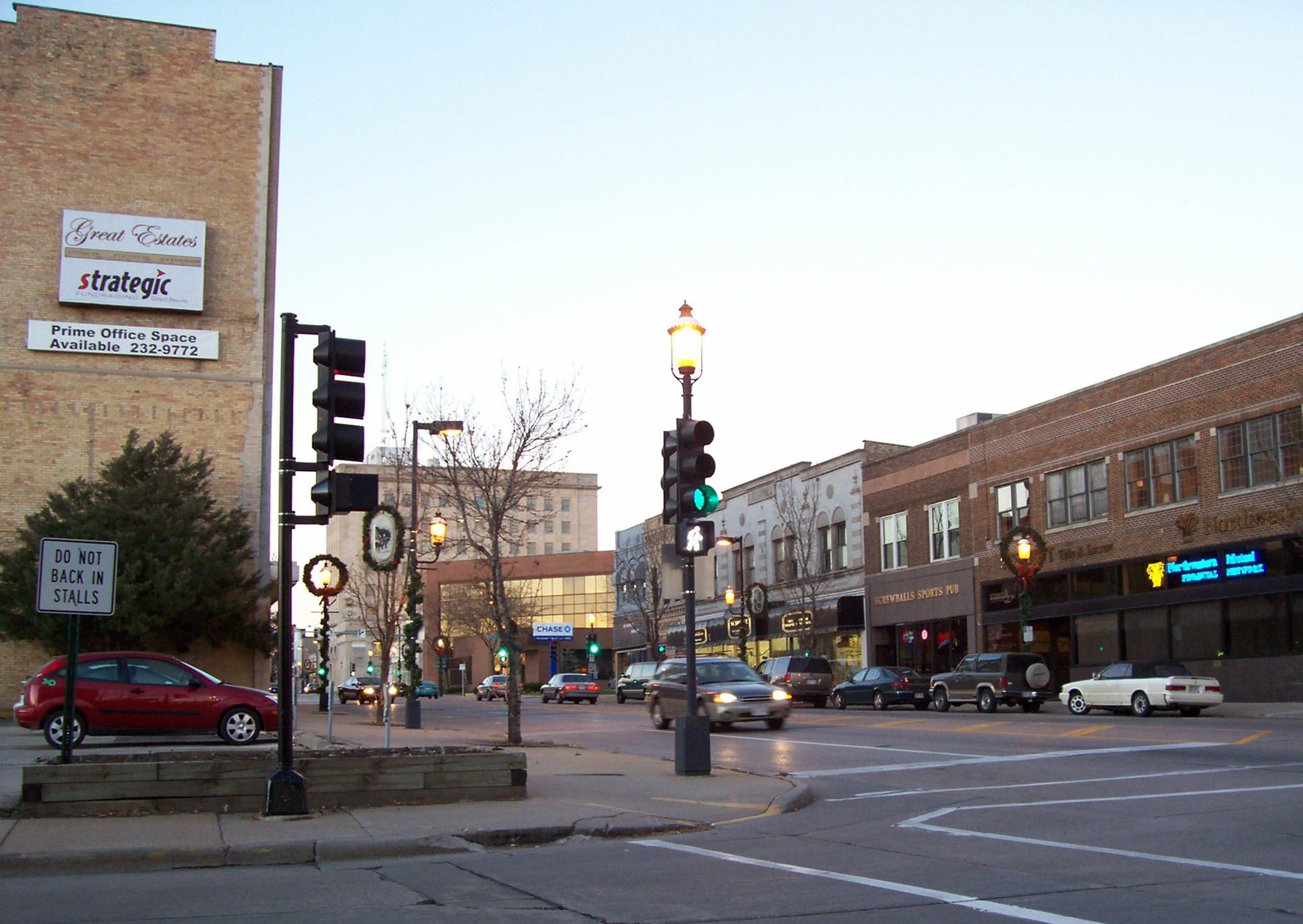
- Downtown Oshkosh at U.S. Route 45
- Nickname: Sawdust City
- Motto: "On the water"
- Interactive map of Oshkosh, Wisconsin
- Location within Wisconsin Location within the United States
- Coordinates: 67000)_region:US-WI 44°01′27″N 88°33′40″W
- Country: United States
- State: Wisconsin
- County: Winnebago
- Incorporated: April 5, 1853; 173 years ago

Government
  - Type: Council-Manager
  - Mayor: Matt Mugerauer
  - City Manager: Rebecca Grill

Area
  - City: 28.03 sq mi (72.60 km^{2})
  - Land: 27.02 sq mi (69.98 km^{2})
  - Water: 1.01 sq mi (2.61 km^{2}) 3.60%
- Elevation: 791 ft (241 m)

Population (2020)
  - City: 66,816
  - Rank: 9th in Wisconsin
  - Density: 2,473/sq mi (954.7/km^{2})
  - Metro: 171,730 (US: 250th)
- Time zone: UTC– 06:00 (CST)
  - Summer (DST): UTC– 05:00 (CDT)
- ZIP Codes: 54901–54904
- Area code: 920
- FIPS code: 55-60500
- Website: www.oshkoshwi.gov

Oshkosh (/ˈɒʃkɒʃ/) is a city in and the county seat of Winnebago County, Wisconsin, United States. It is located along the Fox River between Lake Butte des Morts and Lake Winnebago. The population was 66,816 at the 2020 census, making it the ninth-most populous city in Wisconsin. The Oshkosh metropolitan statistical area, consisting solely of Winnebago County, had 171,730 residents. Oshkosh is included in the greater Fox Cities region of Wisconsin.

== History ==
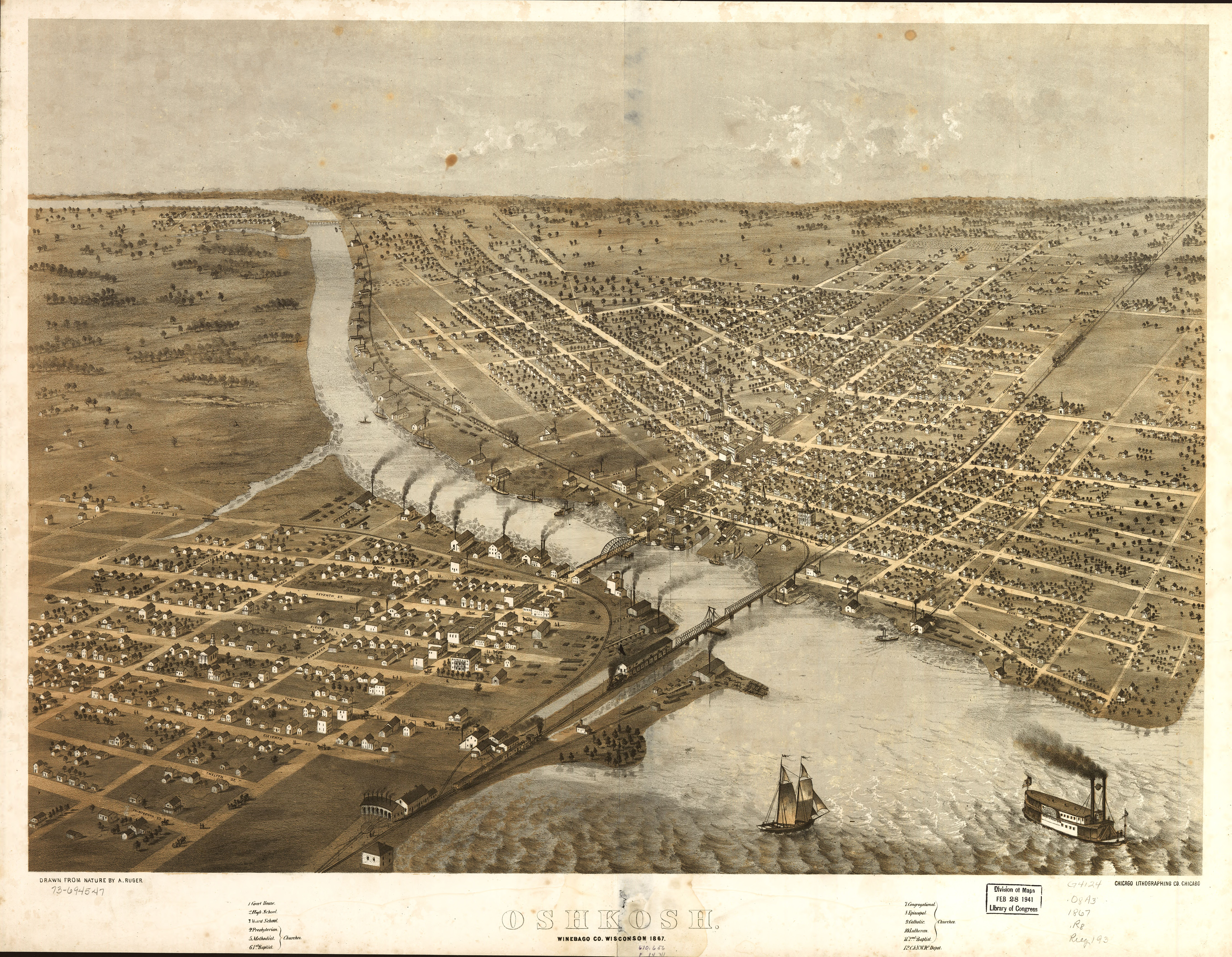
Bird's-eye view of Oshkosh in 1867

Oshkosh was named for Menominee Chief Oshkosh, whose name meant "claw" (cf. Ojibwe oshkanzh, "the claw"). Although the fur trade attracted the first European settlers to the area as early as 1818, it never became a major player in the fur trade. The 1820s mining boom in southwest Wisconsin along with the opening of the Erie Canal shifted commercial activity away from the Fox River Valley and Green Bay. Soon after 1830, much of the trade moved west, as there had been over-trapping in the region.

Following the publicity caused by the Black Hawk War in 1832, there was increased interest in settling Wisconsin by Yankees (from New England and upstate New York), and by 1836 the cities of Milwaukee, Madison, Janesville, Beloit, and Fond du Lac were founded, with Madison the capital of a new territorial government, setting the stage for the economic and political importance of the southern part of the state. However, Oshkosh would continue to be one of Wisconsin's top five largest cities into the twentieth century.

The establishment and growth of the wood industry in the area spurred development of Oshkosh. Already designated as the county seat, Oshkosh was incorporated as a city in 1853. It had a population of nearly 2,800.

The lumber industry became well established as businessmen took advantage of navigable waterways to provide access to both markets and northern pineries. The 1859 arrival of rail transportation expanded the industry's ability to meet the demands of a rapidly growing construction market. At one time, Oshkosh was known as the "Sawdust Capital of the World" due to the number of lumber mills in the city; by 1860, the town had 11 mills.

During the Civil War, the 21st Regiment, Wisconsin Infantry, of the Union Wisconsin Volunteers was organized at Oshkosh, taking in many new recruits. This was one of two units organized in the city; the other was the 6th Regiment, Wisconsin Infantry, organized at Camp Randall, Madison. The 21st mustered on September 5, 1862, marching to Ohio and Louisville, Kentucky, where it participated in the fortification of Louisville later that year. It was attached to the Army of the Ohio and later to the Army of the Cumberland.

By 1870, Oshkosh had become the third-largest city in Wisconsin, with a population of more than 12000. The community attracted a range of professional teachers, attorneys, doctors, businessmen, and others who helped it flourish. The Oshkosh Daily Northwestern newspaper (now the Oshkosh Northwestern) was founded around this time, as was the Oshkosh State Normal School (now the University of Wisconsin Oshkosh). Lumber continued as the mainstay of the city. By 1874, it had 47 sawmills and 15 shingle mills.

On April 28, 1875, Oshkosh had a "Great Fire" that consumed homes and businesses along Main Street north of the Fox River. The fire engulfed 70 stores, 40 factories, and 500 homes, costing nearly $2.5 million (or $67.3 million in 2022 money) in damage.

Around 1900, Oshkosh was home of the Oshkosh Brewing Company, which coined the marketing slogan "By Gosh It's Good." Its Chief Oshkosh brand became a nationally distributed beer. The population of the city in 1910 was 33,062, making it the state's fourth largest city, ahead of Madison and Green Bay.

The Oshkosh All-Stars played in the National Basketball League from 1937 to 1949, before the NBL and the Basketball Association of America merged to become the NBA. Oshkosh reached the NBL's championship finals five times.

=== Historic districts ===
The city has a total of 33 listings on the National Register of Historic Places. Some area entrepreneurs and businessmen made their fortunes in the lumber industry. Many made significant contributions to the community, in both politics and supporting philanthropic organizations. Following devastating fires in the mid-1870s, new buildings were commissioned in Oshkosh that expressed a range of good design: for residential, commercial, civic and religious use.

The many structures which make up the city's historic areas are largely a result of the capital and materials generated by the lumber and associated wood manufacturing industries. Oshkosh had six historic districts as of October 2011. They include the Algoma Boulevard, Irving/Church, North Main Street, Oshkosh State Normal School on the University of Wisconsin–Oshkosh campus, Paine Lumber Company, and Washington Avenue historic districts.

The city had 27 historic buildings and sites individually listed on the NRHP as of October 2011. Eleven are houses, four are churches, and the remainder include schools, colleges, a bank, a fire house, an observatory, the Winnebago County Courthouse, and a cemetery where many of the entrepreneurs are buried.

== Geography ==
Oshkosh is located at 44°1′29″N 88°33′4″W (44.024983, −88.551336). It is located along the Fox River between the eastern shore of Lake Butte des Morts and the western shore of Lake Winnebago, within the Winnebago Pool of lakes.

According to the United States Census Bureau, the city has a total area of 26.61 square miles (68.92 km^{2}), of which 25.59 square miles (66.28 km^{2}) is land and 1.02 square miles (2.64 km^{2}) is water.

The City of Oshkosh forms the center of a metropolitan area reaching into the adjacent towns of: the Town of Oshkosh in the north and the towns of Algoma to the west, Nekimi in the southwest and Black Wolf ton the southeast, all within Winnebago County. The shared border within the Town of Oshkosh is particularly complex, involving a multitude of exclaves and panhandles.

=== Climate ===
Oshkosh has a hot-summer humid continental climate (Köppen: Dfa). Summer days are warm to hot with cool to mild nights. Winters are cold and long with moderate snowfall. Precipitation peaks from late spring to early fall.

Climate data for Oshkosh (1991–2020 normals, extremes 1893–present)
Month	Jan	Feb	Mar	Apr	May	Jun	Jul	Aug	Sep	Oct	Nov	Dec	Year
Record high °F (°C)	57 (14)	67 (19)	83 (28)	91 (33)	104 (40)	102 (39)	107 (42)	102 (39)	99 (37)	90 (32)	78 (26)	65 (18)	107 (42)
Mean daily maximum °F (°C)	26.1 (−3.3)	29.9 (−1.2)	41.3 (5.2)	54.4 (12.4)	67.3 (19.6)	77.3 (25.2)	81.7 (27.6)	79.8 (26.6)	72.5 (22.5)	59.0 (15.0)	44.2 (6.8)	31.8 (−0.1)	55.4 (13.0)
Daily mean °F (°C)	18.1 (−7.7)	21.4 (−5.9)	32.4 (0.2)	45.0 (7.2)	57.7 (14.3)	68.0 (20.0)	72.2 (22.3)	70.4 (21.3)	62.6 (17.0)	49.9 (9.9)	36.6 (2.6)	24.7 (−4.1)	46.6 (8.1)
Mean daily minimum °F (°C)	10.2 (−12.1)	12.9 (−10.6)	23.5 (−4.7)	35.7 (2.1)	48.0 (8.9)	58.8 (14.9)	62.7 (17.1)	61.0 (16.1)	52.7 (11.5)	40.8 (4.9)	28.9 (−1.7)	17.5 (−8.1)	37.7 (3.2)
Record low °F (°C)	−32 (−36)	−34 (−37)	−24 (−31)	5 (−15)	20 (−7)	28 (−2)	30 (−1)	32 (0)	25 (−4)	8 (−13)	−8 (−22)	−27 (−33)	−34 (−37)
Average precipitation inches (mm)	1.34 (34)	1.11 (28)	1.92 (49)	3.21 (82)	3.94 (100)	4.82 (122)	3.76 (96)	3.40 (86)	3.26 (83)	2.89 (73)	2.05 (52)	1.59 (40)	33.29 (846)
Average snowfall inches (cm)	9.8 (25)	10.1 (26)	5.4 (14)	1.8 (4.6)	0.0 (0.0)	0.0 (0.0)	0.0 (0.0)	0.0 (0.0)	0.0 (0.0)	0.3 (0.76)	1.8 (4.6)	10.0 (25)	39.2 (100)
Average precipitation days (≥ 0.01 in)	8.9	8.1	8.6	11.4	12.1	11.4	10.2	9.8	9.3	10.4	9.0	9.3	118.5
Average snowy days (≥ 0.1 in)	6.3	5.7	3.3	1.1	0.0	0.0	0.0	0.0	0.0	0.1	1.7	5.5	23.7
Average ultraviolet index	1	2	3	5	7	8	8	7	5	3	2	1	4
Source 1: NOAA
Source 2: Weather Atlas (UV index)

== Demographics ==
Historical population
Census	Pop.	Note	%±
1860	6,086		—
1870	12,663		108.1%
1880	15,748		24.4%
1890	22,836		45.0%
1900	28,284		23.9%
1910	33,062		16.9%
1920	33,162		0.3%
1930	40,108		20.9%
1940	39,089		−2.5%
1950	41,084		5.1%
1960	45,110		9.8%
1970	53,082		17.7%
1980	49,620		−6.5%
1990	55,006		10.9%
2000	62,916		14.4%
2010	66,083		5.0%
2020	66,816		1.1%
U.S. Census Bureau

=== 2020 census ===
As of the 2020 census, Oshkosh had a population of 66,816. The population density was 2,472.7 inhabitants per square mile (954.7/km^{2}), and housing density was 1,081.5 units per square mile (417.6 units/km^{2}). The median age was 35.3 years. 18.2% of residents were under the age of 18 and 15.8% of residents were 65 years of age or older. For every 100 females there were 104.0 males, and for every 100 females age 18 and over there were 103.9 males age 18 and over.

99.9% of residents lived in urban areas, while 0.1% lived in rural areas.

There were 27,509 households in Oshkosh, of which 22.8% had children under the age of 18 living in them. Of all households, 35.2% were married-couple households, 24.4% were households with a male householder and no spouse or partner present, and 30.6% were households with a female householder and no spouse or partner present. About 37.5% of all households were made up of individuals and 13.7% had someone living alone who was 65 years of age or older.

There were 29,222 housing units, of which 5.9% were vacant. The homeowner vacancy rate was 1.1% and the rental vacancy rate was 5.5%.

The 2020 census population of the city included 3,045 people incarcerated in adult correctional facilities and 2,767 people in student housing.

Racial composition as of the 2020 census
Race	Number	Percentage
White	55,470	83.0%
Black or African American	3,549	5.3%
American Indian and Alaska Native	565	0.8%
Asian	2,973	4.4%
Native Hawaiian and Other Pacific Islander	24	0.0%
Some other race	902	1.3%
Two or more races	3,333	5.0%
Hispanic or Latino (of any race)	2,965	4.4%

=== 2016–2020 ACS estimates ===
According to the American Community Survey estimates for 2016–2020, the median income for a household in the city was $51,282, and the median income for a family was $70,534. Male full-time workers had a median income of $47,470 versus $37,319 for female workers. The per capita income for the city was $25,625. About 8.0% of families and 17.1% of the population were below the poverty line, including 18.3% of those under age 18 and 10.5% of those age 65 or over. Of the population age 25 and over, 91.3% were high school graduates or higher and 26.4% had a bachelor's degree or higher.

=== 2010 census ===
As of the census of 2010, there were 66,083 people, 26,138 households, and 13,836 families residing in the city. The population density was 2,582.4 inhabitants per square mile (997.1/km^{2}). There were 28,179 housing units at an average density of 1,101.2 units per square mile (425.2 units/km^{2}). The racial makeup of the city was 90.5% White, 3.1% African American, 0.8% Native American, 3.2% Asian, 0.7% from other races, and 1.7% from two or more races. Hispanic or Latino of any race were 2.7% of the population.

There were 26,138 households, of which 25.7% had children under the age of 18 living with them, 38.7% were married couples living together, 10.0% had a female householder with no husband present, 4.3% had a male householder with no wife present, and 47.1% were non-families. Of all households, 34.4% were made up of individuals, and 11.4% had someone living alone who was 65 years of age or older. The average household size was 2.24 and the average family size was 2.90.

The median age in the city was 33.5 years. 18.6% of residents were under the age of 18; 18.7% were between the ages of 18 and 24; 26.7% were from 25 to 44; 23% were from 45 to 64; and 12.9% were 65 years of age or older. The gender makeup of the city was 51.2% male and 48.8% female.

=== 2000 census ===
As of the census of 2000, there were 62,916 people, 24,082 households, and 13,654 families residing in the city. The population density was 2,662.2 people per square mile (1,027.9 people/km^{2}). There were 25,420 housing units at an average density of 1,075.6 units per square mile (415.3 units/km^{2}). The racial makeup of the city was 92.73% White, 2.19% Black or African American, 0.52% Native American, 3.03% Asian, 0.03% Pacific Islander, 0.53% from other races, and 0.98% from two or more races. 1.69% of the population were Hispanic or Latino of any race. 52.2% were of German and 6.3% Irish ancestry according to Census 2000.

There were 24,082 households, out of which 27.3% had children under the age of 18 living with them, 44.3% were married couples living together, 9.1% had a female householder with no husband present, and 43.3% were non-families. Of all households, 32.4% were made up of individuals, and 11.7% had someone living alone who was 65 years of age or older. The average household size was 2.31 and the average family size was 2.95.

In the city, the population was spread out, with 20.7% under the age of 18, 18.1% from 18 to 24, 29.7% from 25 to 44, 18.3% from 45 to 64, and 13.1% who were 65 years of age or older. The median age was 32 years. For every 100 females, there were 99.9 males. For every 100 females age 18 and over, there were 98.7 males.

=== Ethnic communities ===
Oshkosh is known for its large ethnic German population, comprising roughly 45% of the population. Per the 2022 American Community Survey five-year estimates, the German American population was 28,253. Like other Wisconsin cities, Oshkosh received Hmong refugees; the Hmong population was estimated 2,165 in 2022 and comprised over two-thirds of the city's Asian population.

== Economy ==
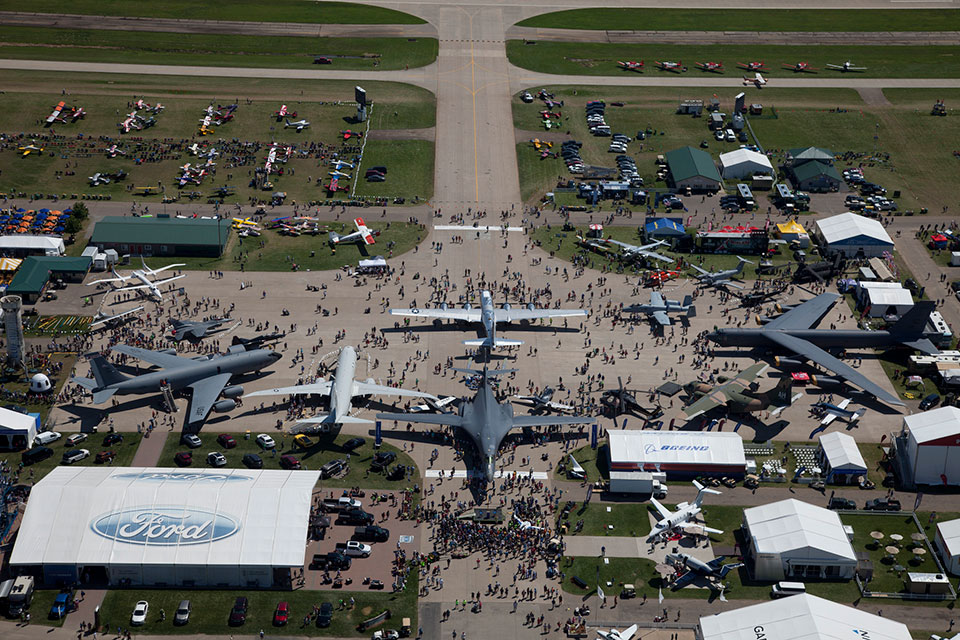
EAA AirVenture Oshkosh

Oshkosh Corporation is headquartered in Oshkosh. Oshkosh Corporation, formerly Oshkosh Truck, is a manufacturer and marketer of specialty vehicles and bodies in four primary business groups: Access Equipment, Defense, Fire & Emergency, and Commercial. Plastic packaging is also a major industry, with Amcor, formerly Bemis, as a major employer. There are two well known chocolate companies located in Oshkosh, Hughes and Oaks.

Oshkosh is known for OshKosh B'gosh, a manufacturer of overalls and children's clothing founded in the city in 1895. Originally a small-town manufacturer of adult work clothing, it became best known for its children's lines. The original children's overalls, dating from the early twentieth century, were intended to help children dress like their fathers. According to the company, sales increased dramatically when Miles Kimball, an Oshkosh-based mail-order catalog, featured a pair of the overalls in its national catalog. As a result, OshKosh B'Gosh began to sell their products through department stores and expanded their children's line. Their office is now based in Atlanta, Georgia.

Oshkosh is the home of EAA AirVenture Oshkosh, "The World's Greatest Aviation Celebration" held by the Experimental Aircraft Association, Inc. ("EAA"). AirVenture is the world's largest airshow. During AirVenture, air traffic at Wittman Regional Airport exceeds that of any other airport in the world. EAA is a non-profit member organization, dedicated to home-built aircraft, restored aircraft, and Light-sport aircraft, and fostering an interest in flying in children 8–18 years old through its Young Eagles program.

Tourism and events are part of the local economy. Recreational fishing and boating on Lake Winnebago include many active fishing tournaments, an annual sturgeon spearing season, and frequent yacht and boat races. Music festivals include the summer-long WaterFest downtown and major summer music festivals for country, Christian, and rock music. December features a drive-through light show that brings in visitors from the surrounding area.

Oshkosh is also home to two regional hospitals and the Winnebago Mental Health Institute, located in nearby Winnebago.

== Arts and culture ==
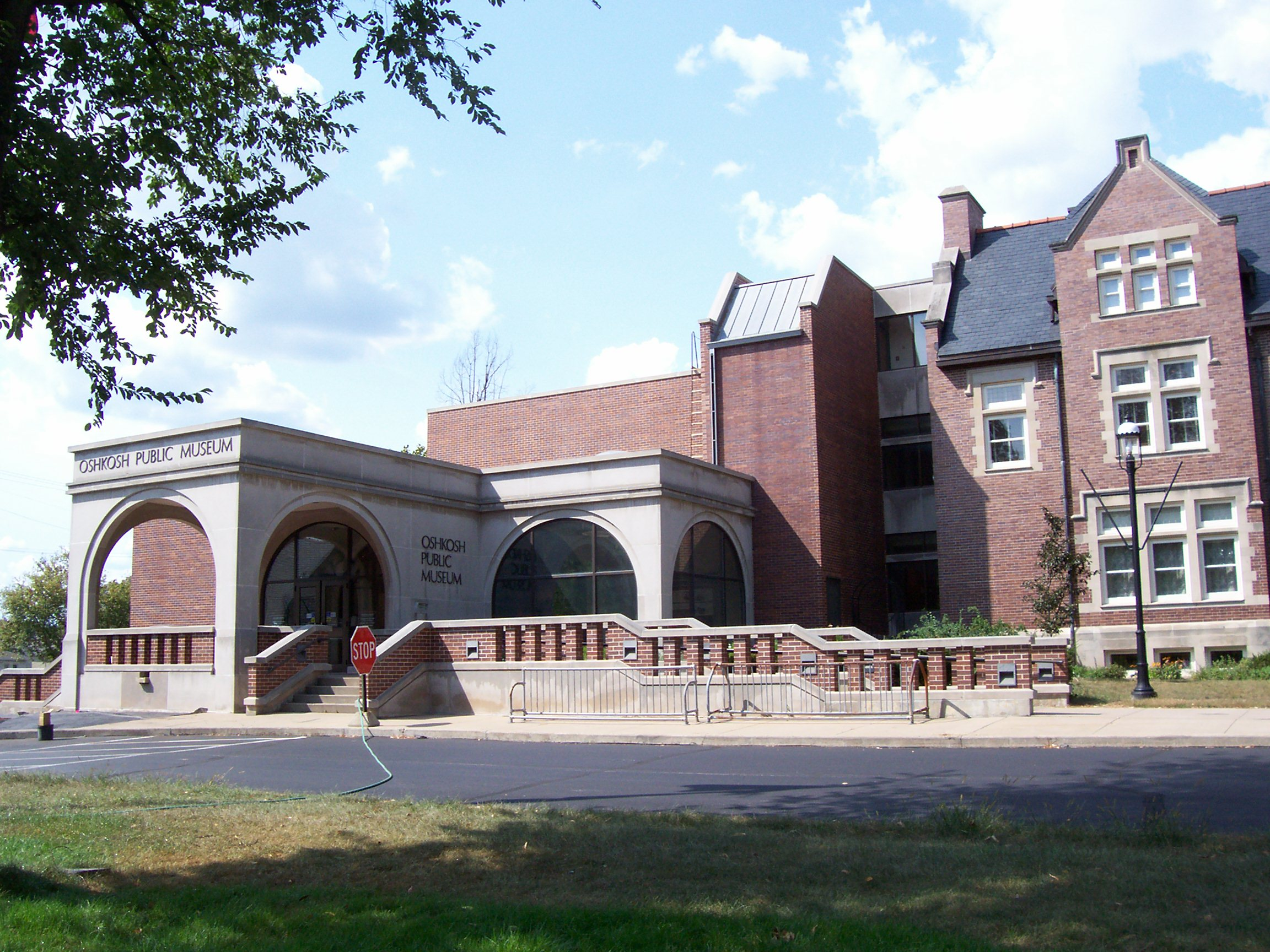
Oshkosh Public Museum

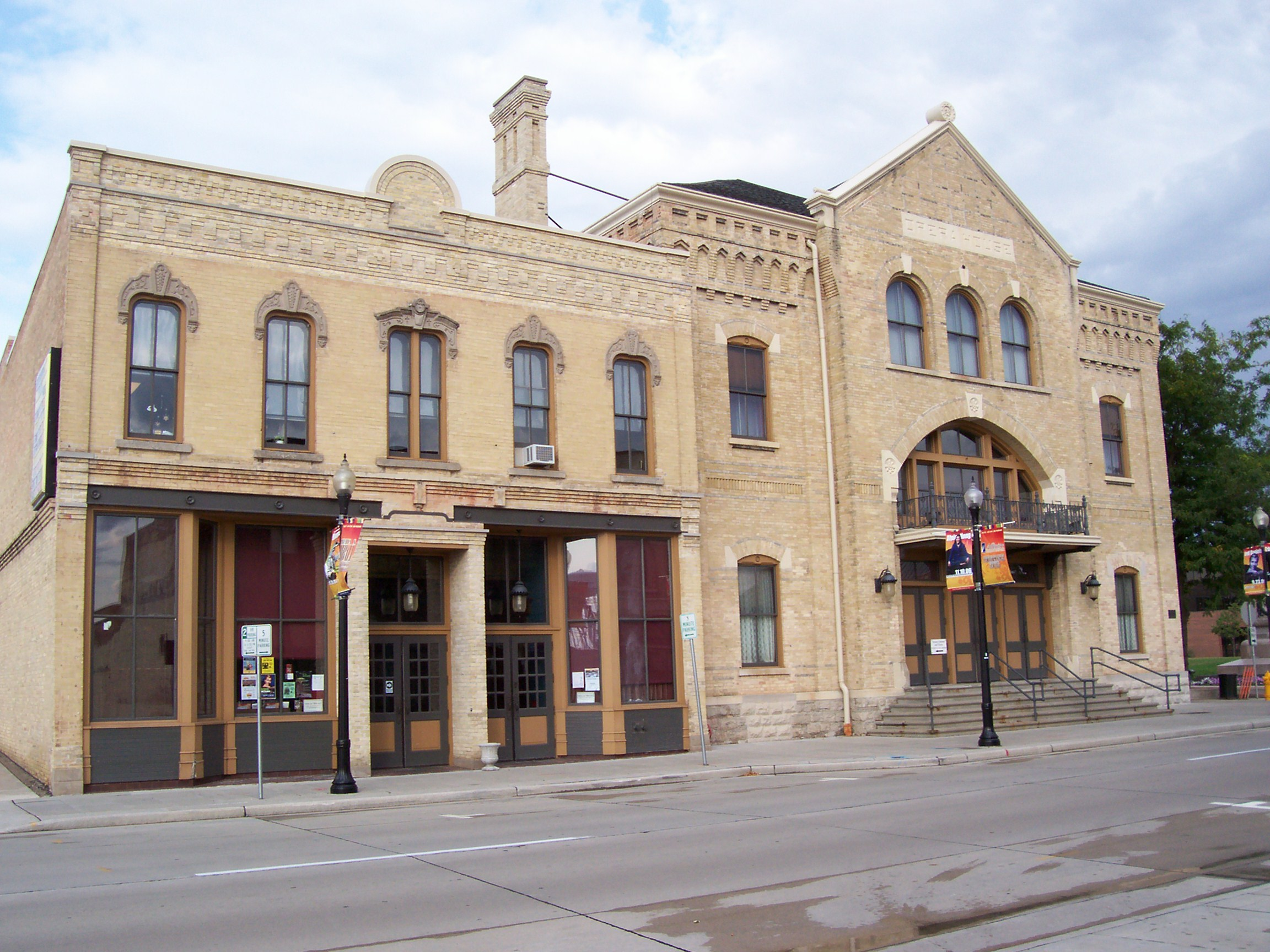
Grand Opera House

A downtown redevelopment plan led to the construction of the outdoor Leach Amphitheater on the Fox River. It hosts the weekly Waterfest concert series during the summer, as well as national touring musical acts and local community events. Also in downtown Oshkosh is the Grand Opera House, a performing arts center. Downtown Oshkosh has a farmers Market on Saturdays in the summer.

The Downtown Oshkosh Gallery Walk, held every first Saturday of the month year-round, surged in attendance through the warmer months of 2006. A number of downtown Oshkosh music venues have opened, and existing venues have tended to expand their schedules, following the trend of the area at large. The Jambalaya Art Cooperative and Art Space Collective have been long standing anchors of the Gallery Walk. In 2010, Chicago Magazine said The Jambalaya Cooperative, 413 N. Main St., was a "must see" destination when visiting Oshkosh.

Long-running community festivals, such as Sawdust Days in Menominee Park, was a popular event but discontinued in 2019. Menominee Park is also the site of the Menominee Park Zoo.

Pub Crawl is an unsanctioned, unofficial event that happens twice a year, once in the fall and once in the spring on the second weekend of April and October. Supposedly, according to the organizers, it was the largest and longest running college pub crawl. It is not officially sanctioned by the city, but it used to attract students across the state to the university area. Many area bars and restaurants reported an uptick in sales, though with the raised revenue also came higher incident rates for local police. The local university put in measures to keep students safe and control how people move throughout the campus.

From 1999 to 2019, the Seventh-day Adventist-hosted International Pathfinder Camporee was held in Oshkosh, gathering tens of thousands youth and adults from all over the world every 5 years. The most recent Camporee in 2019 gathered over 56000 Pathfinders, and is considered the largest Adventist youth event in history, with over 1000 people being baptized. One of the main highlights of the camporees were the evening programs, specifically the plays which reenacted the stories of famous characters and stories from the Bible onstage. They were held in campgrounds close to the EAA Aviation Museum, with some of the hangars being renovated to make room for booths where Pathfinders would get multiple honors. In 2021, it was announced that the International Pathfinder Camporee would be hosted in Gillette, Wyoming, in 2024.

It is also stated that a HobbyTown USA in Oshkosh was the setting of several photos taken in 2002 that would later resurface on 4chan and become recognized as the online creepypasta "The Backrooms". The original photo, allegedly taken in the same HobbyTown, has reportedly been referenced in a film adaptation of the concept, in which one frame is said to closely resemble the original image.

== Sports ==
The Milwaukee Bucks NBA basketball team placed their development team, the Wisconsin Herd, in Oshkosh beginning with the 2017–2018 season. The team plays basketball at Oshkosh Arena.

Other points of interest include:

- EAA Aviation Museum
- Military Veterans Museum
- Oshkosh Airshow
- Grand Opera House
- Oshkosh Public Museum
- Paine Art Center and Gardens
- Oshkosh Public Library
- University of Wisconsin–Oshkosh
- The southern terminus of the Wiouwash State Trail.

== Government ==
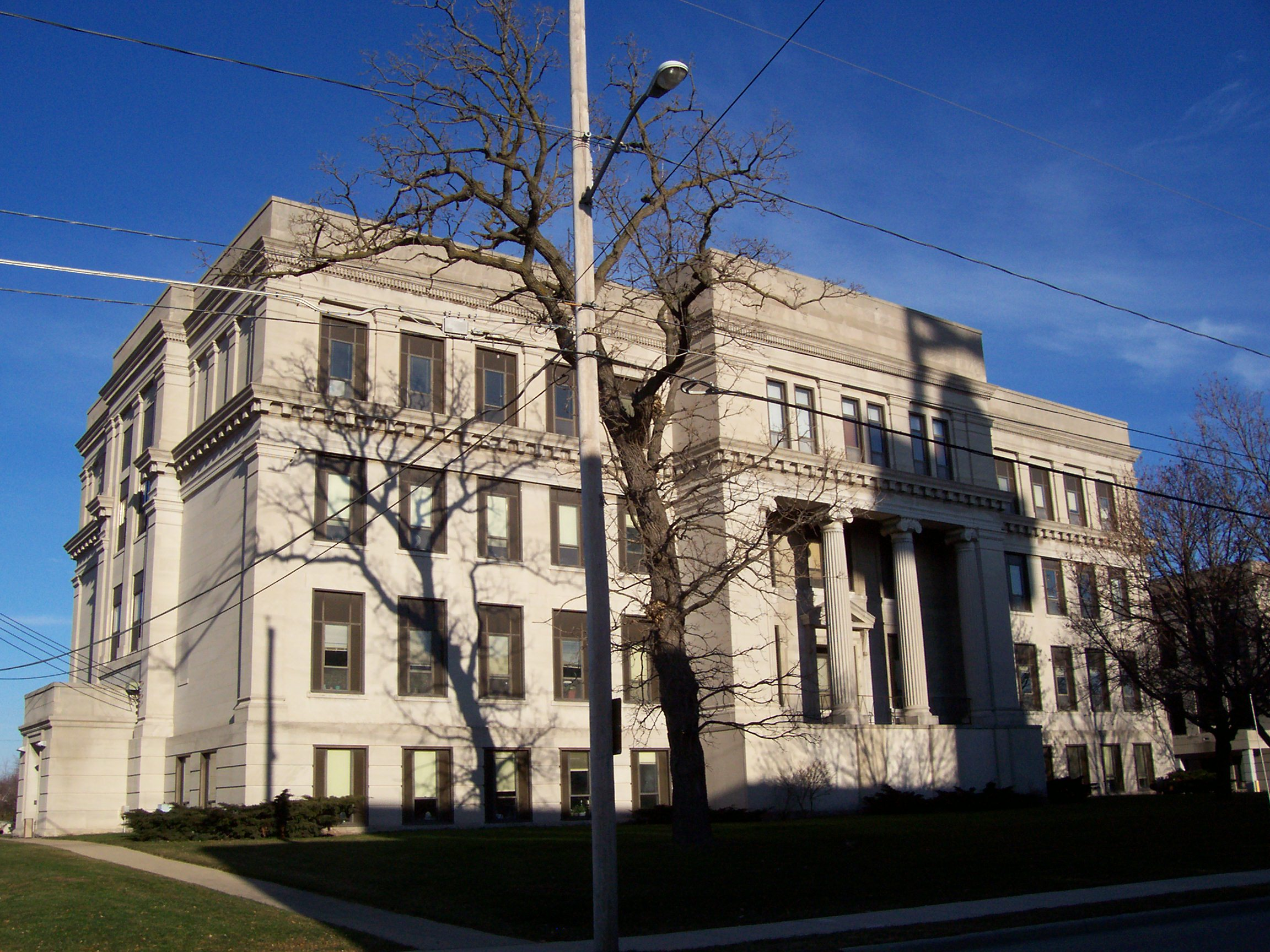
City hall

Oshkosh had a mayor-alderman form of government from its charter in 1853. It abolished the position of mayor and implemented the council-manager form of government in 1957. The city-wide elected office of "mayor" was subsequently restored in 2005, but is more akin to president of the city council. Executive power in the city still resides with the city manager.

The current city manager is Rebecca Grill, who was selected by the city council in 2024. The mayor is Matt Mugerauer, elected in 2023.

For representation in the state legislature, Oshkosh has been primarily represented by the 54th Assembly district since the 1983 redistricting law. Since 1992, the 53rd district has also represented parts of the city of Oshkosh, but the bulk of that district is rural and suburban areas of Winnebago and Fond du Lac counties. After the 2024 redistricting, the 54th district will still contain most of Oshkosh, but the southern third of the city will be part of the 55th district, which also comprises most of the rest of the territory of Winnebago County.

In the State Senate, Oshkosh is part of the 18th Senate district, represented by Dan Feyen (R). After the 2024 redistricting, most of Oshkosh will still be in the 18th Senate district, but the southern third of the city will be in the 19th Senate district, represented by Rachael Cabral-Guevara (R).

Federally, Oshkosh falls within Wisconsin's 6th congressional district, which is represented by Glenn Grothman (R) since 2015. Wisconsin's United States senators are Ron Johnson (R) and Tammy Baldwin (D).

The Oshkosh Correctional Institution, a Wisconsin Department of Corrections prison, is located in Oshkosh.

== Education ==
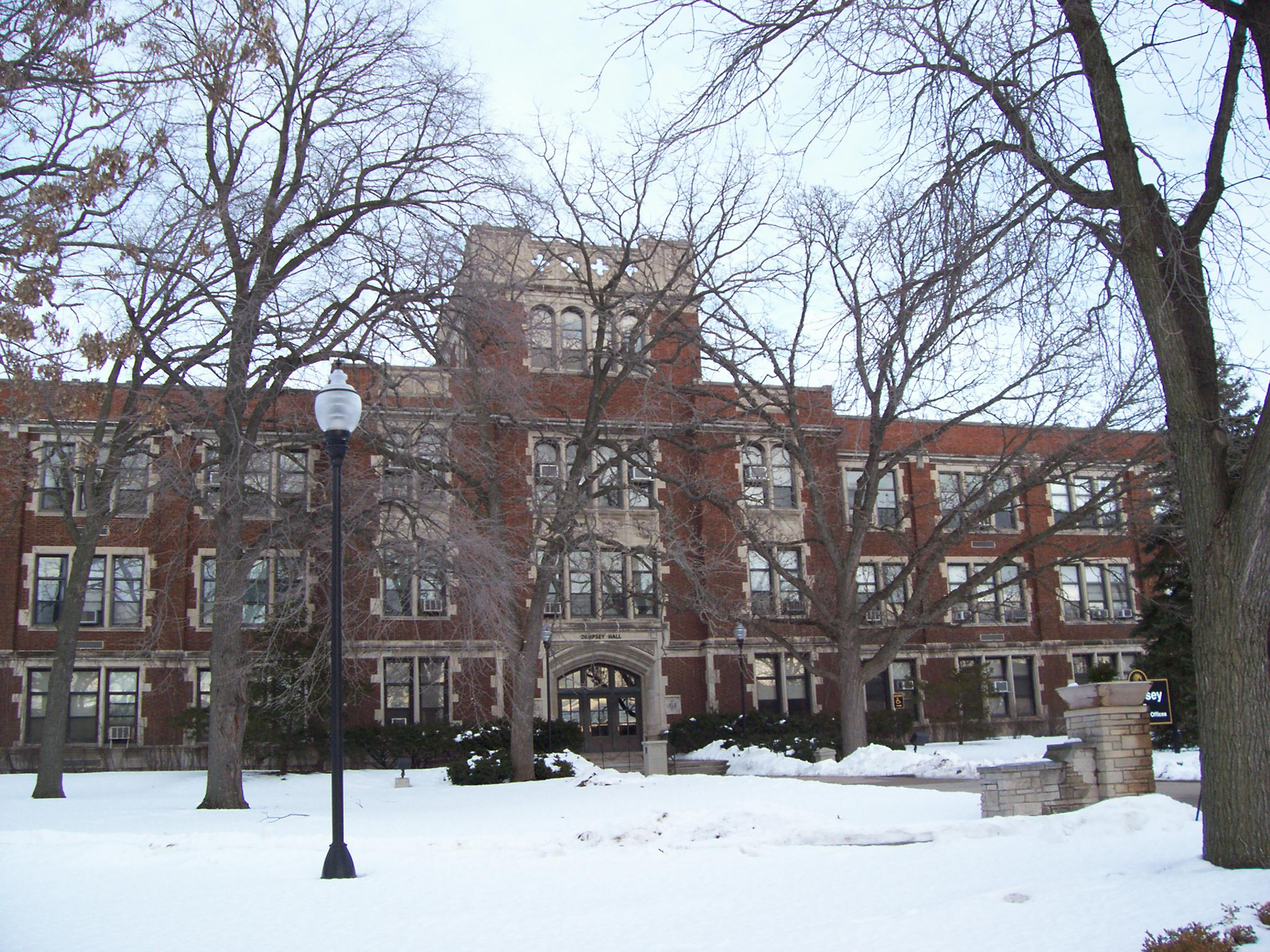
University of Wisconsin–Oshkosh

Oshkosh has 14 public elementary schools, five public middle schools, and two high schools operated by the Oshkosh Area School District. The high schools in the Oshkosh Area School District are Oshkosh North High School and Oshkosh West High School. Lourdes High School is one of the private schools in the city.

The University of Wisconsin–Oshkosh, the third-largest university in the state, is located in Oshkosh. The downtown campus serves approximately 15000 students and employs 1,700 staff members. Higher education is also served by a campus of the Fox Valley Technical College.

== Transportation ==
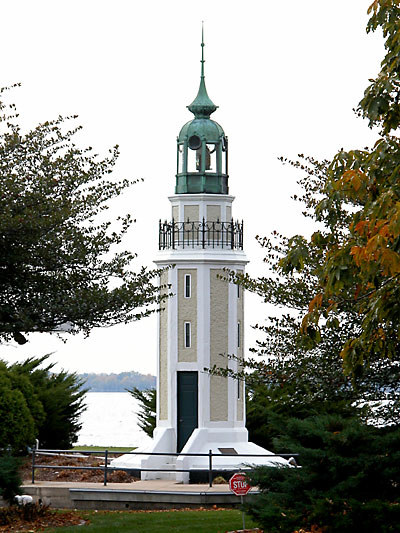
Rockwell Light is located on the northern harbor of Oshkosh, on Lake Winnebago.

=== Major highways ===
Interstate 41 Northbound routes to Appleton and Green Bay. Southbound, I-41 routes to Fond du Lac and Milwaukee and Waukegan It has six exits serving the Oshkosh area at: Exit 113 - WIS 26/Hwy N - Waupun Rd. Exit 116 - WIS 44, WIS 91 - South Park Ave./Ripon Rd. Exit 117 - 9th Ave. Exit 119 - WIS 21 - Oshkosh Ave./Omro Rd. Exit 120 - US 45 - Algoma Blvd. Exit 124 - WIS 76 - Jackson St.
U.S. Route 41 US 41 is cosigned with Interstate 41 in the Oshkosh area.
WIS 21 travels west to Omro, Redgranite, Wisconsin Wautoma, Coloma, Wisconsin, Necedah, Wisconsin, Tomah, Wisconsin and Sparta, Wisconsin WIS 21 is partly or entirely along Omro Rd., Oshkosh Ave., Congress Ave., and Algoma Blvd.
WIS 26 Southbound, routes to Rosendale, Waupun, Beaver Dam, Watertown, Ft. Atkinson, and Janesville, Wisconsin. This is Waupun Rd.
WIS 44 travels southwest to Ripon, Wisconsin. WIS 44 is partly or entirely along Ripon Rd., South Park Ave., Ohio St., Wisconsin St., and Irving Ave.
U.S. Route 45 travels north to New London, Wisconsin and Clintonville, Wisconsin, and travels south to Fond du Lac along Lake Winnebago. US 45 is partly or entirely along Fond du Lac Rd., Main St., Algoma Blvd. (Northbound) / High Ave. (Southbound), Jackson St., Murdock St., and Algoma Blvd. Algoma Blvd was Wis 110 until the mid-2000s when US 45 was rerouted on the freeway that heads northwest out of town.
WIS 76 travels north to Shiocton, Wisconsin. This is Jackson St. from US 45 Murdock St heading north.
WIS 91 travels west to Berlin, Wisconsin. This is cosigned with WIS 44 along South Park Ave west of US 41 to Waukau Rd. Then it continues west on Waukau Rd.

=== Bus ===
Oshkosh is also served by the GO Transit (formerly Oshkosh Transit System), which runs nine fixed-route bus routes throughout the city from 6:15 am until 6:45 pm Monday through Saturday. One of these routes also connects Oshkosh with Neenah, Wisconsin, and the Fox Cities' transit system, Valley Transit. Intercity buses to Green Bay, Madison and other destinations are provided by Amtrak Thruway, Lamers Bus Lines, and Van Galder Bus Company.

=== Airport ===
Oshkosh's airport, Wittman Field or Wittman Regional Airport (KOSH), opened in 1927 as Oshkosh Airport Inc. The airport had commercial traffic starting in 1928 when Northwest Airways delivered mail to Oshkosh and the Fox Cities. In 1972, the airport was renamed after race pilot Steve Wittman, who was the airport manager for 38 years.

Wittman Field had commercial service on a number of airlines until 2003. Wittman was served at various times by Wisconsin Central Airlines, North Central, Republic, Air Wisconsin, American Central, Midstate Airlines, Northwest Airlink, United Express, Midway Connection, Skyway, and Great Lakes. Service on the final carrier, Great Lakes, was terminated in 2003 following the FAA's termination of a federal subsidy.

In the 21st century, Wittman Field continues to host the EAA AirVenture Air Show and Expo (formerly the EAA Annual Convention and Fly-In up to 1998). The EAA was founded in 1953 in Milwaukee, Wisconsin, by Paul Poberezny. The event was first held at Timmerman Field. In 1959, it was moved to Rockford, Illinois. By 1969, the EAA had grown too big for Rockford Municipal Airport, and the convention voted on moving to Oshkosh. During the Airshow, Wittman Regional Airport becomes the busiest airport in the world: more than 600000 people and 10000 airplanes attend AirVenture each year.

The closest airport with commercial service is Appleton International Airport in Appleton, Wisconsin.
