= Laurence A. Johnson =

Laurence A. Johnson was an American businessman and political activist who owned four supermarkets in Syracuse, New York. Johnson and his daughter, Eleanor Johnson, targeted members of the film and television industries whom he suspected of being Communists during the McCarthy Era. Eleanor assisted her father with mimeographing, mailing, and contacts. In 1951, he and his daughter talked with the members of the American Legion Post in Syracuse. With the help of the post, Johnson and his daughter soon became a force felt throughout radio and television. He embarked on a one-man "Syracuse Crusade" in the 1950s to force television advertisers to cancel sponsorship of programs in which "suspect" actors appeared. Johnson's pressure tactics were a manifestation of McCarthyism and the Hollywood Blacklist. Their tactics cost untold numbers of television and film actors their jobs and even their entire careers.

Johnson died shortly after he lost a major court case filed by John Henry Faulk, who lost his radio career because of machinations by Johnson and AWARE, Inc.
