= Larry Johnson (artist) =

American artist

Larry Johnson (b.1959) is an American artist living and working in Los Angeles. Johnson’s humorous and often cutting commentaries on his own culture’s exported ideologies have made him one of the foremost artists of his generation.

== Early life and career ==
Larry Johnson was born in Lakewood, California. Johnson began studying at the California Institute of the Arts (CalArts) in 1978 and graduated in 1982 with a Bachelor of Fine Arts. He continued to his graduate studies at CalArts, receiving his Masters of Fine Arts in 1984. While studying at CalArts Johnson mentored under the Conceptual artist Douglas Huebler.

He currently is on the art faculty of Otis College of Art and Design.

== Exhibitions ==
=== Selected solo exhibitions ===
- 2016: MAMCO, Geneva, Switzerland
- 2015: On Location, Raven Row, London, UK
- 2009: Hammer Museum, Los Angeles, CA

=== Selected exhibitions with others ===
- 2020: Made in LA: a version, Hammer Museum, Los Angeles CA
- 2019: Larry Johnson & Asha Schechter, Jenny's, Los Angeles, CA
- 2009: MOCA's First Thirty Years, The Museum of Contemporary Art, Los Angeles, CA
- 2004: Forest of Signs, Museum of Contemporary Art, Los Angeles, CA
- 1991: Whitney Biennial, Whitney Museum of American Art, New York, NY
- 1989: California Photography: Remaking Make-Believe, The Museum of Modern Art, New York, NY; Aspen Art Museum, Aspen, CO
- 1988: XLIII Esposizione Internazionale d'Arte, La Biennale di Venezia, Venice, Italy
- 1987: On View, New Museum of Contemporary Art, New York, NY
- 1987: Documenta 8, Kassel, Germany

== Public and museum collections ==
- Los Angeles County Museum of Art, Los Angeles, CA
- Art Institute of Chicago, Chicago, IL
- Denver Art Museum, Denver, CO
- Dallas Museum of Art, Dallas, TX
- Hammer Museum, Los Angeles, CA
- MAMCO, Geneva, Switzerland
- Museum of Contemporary Art, Los Angeles, CA
- Museum of Modern Art, New York, NY
- Whitney Museum, New York, NY

== Books ==
- Larry Johnson: Commie Pinko Guy Edited by Bruce Hainley. Texts by Morgan Fisher, Bruce Hainley, Antony Hudek, Larry Johnson, Wayne Koestenbaum, Lisa Lapinski, Pleasant Gehman, James McCourt, Boyd McDonald, Duncan Smith, Koenig Books, 2015
- Larry Johnson (Monograph) Essays by Russell Ferguson, Lee Edelman, and Esther Leslie, and an interview with the artist by David Rimanelli. Hammer Publications, 2007
- Larry Johnson Edited by Sherri Schottlaender. Texts by Scott Watson, Laurence A. Rickels and Gary Indiana. Published by the Morris and Helen Belkin Art Gallery at The University of British Columbia, Vancouver, 1996
