= Society of Diagnostic Medical Sonography =

Organization

The Society of Diagnostic Medical Sonography (SDMS) is a nonprofit professional association, representing over 24,000 sonographers and sonography student members across all fifty U.S. states and forty-eight countries, as of 2022. SDMS hosts an annual conference for sonographers and publishes a bi-monthly journal, the Journal of Diagnostic Medical Sonography. The SDMS provides its membership with a comprehensive array of continuing medical education activities, information, and products reflecting all of the sonography specialty areas, including:

- Abdominal Sonography
- Adult Cardiac Sonography
- Breast Sonography
- Fetal Cardiac Sonography
- Musculoskeletal Sonography
- Neurosonology
- OB/Gyn Sonography
- Pediatric Cardiac Sonography
- Point-of-Care Sonography
- Physician Vascular Interpretation
- Vascular Sonography
- Veterinary Sonography

The association has a broad advocacy program focused on legislative and regulatory initiatives designed to support sonographers and quality control standards for sonography services provided to patients by the SDMS membership. The SDMS publishes resources related to the practice of diagnostic medical sonography, including the Scope of Practice and Clinical Standards for the Diagnostic Medical Sonographer, the Guidelines for Infection Prevention and Control in Sonography, and the Industry Standards for the Prevention of Work-Related Musculoskeletal Disorders in Sonography.

== History and Affiliations ==
The SDMS was incorporated in 1970 in the State of Washington and is registered with the Texas Secretary of State as a foreign corporation operating in Plano, Texas. The SDMS is recognized by the US Internal Revenue Service as an exempt organization under Internal Revenue Code (IRC) Section 501(c)(6). The SDMS is affiliated with another nonprofit organizations - the SDMS Foundation, which is recognized by the US Internal Revenue Service as an exempt organization under Internal Revenue Code (IRC) Section 501(c)(3) as a public charity (offering grants, scholarships, education, research, and international assistance programs).
