= Sonographer =

Healthcare professional specialization

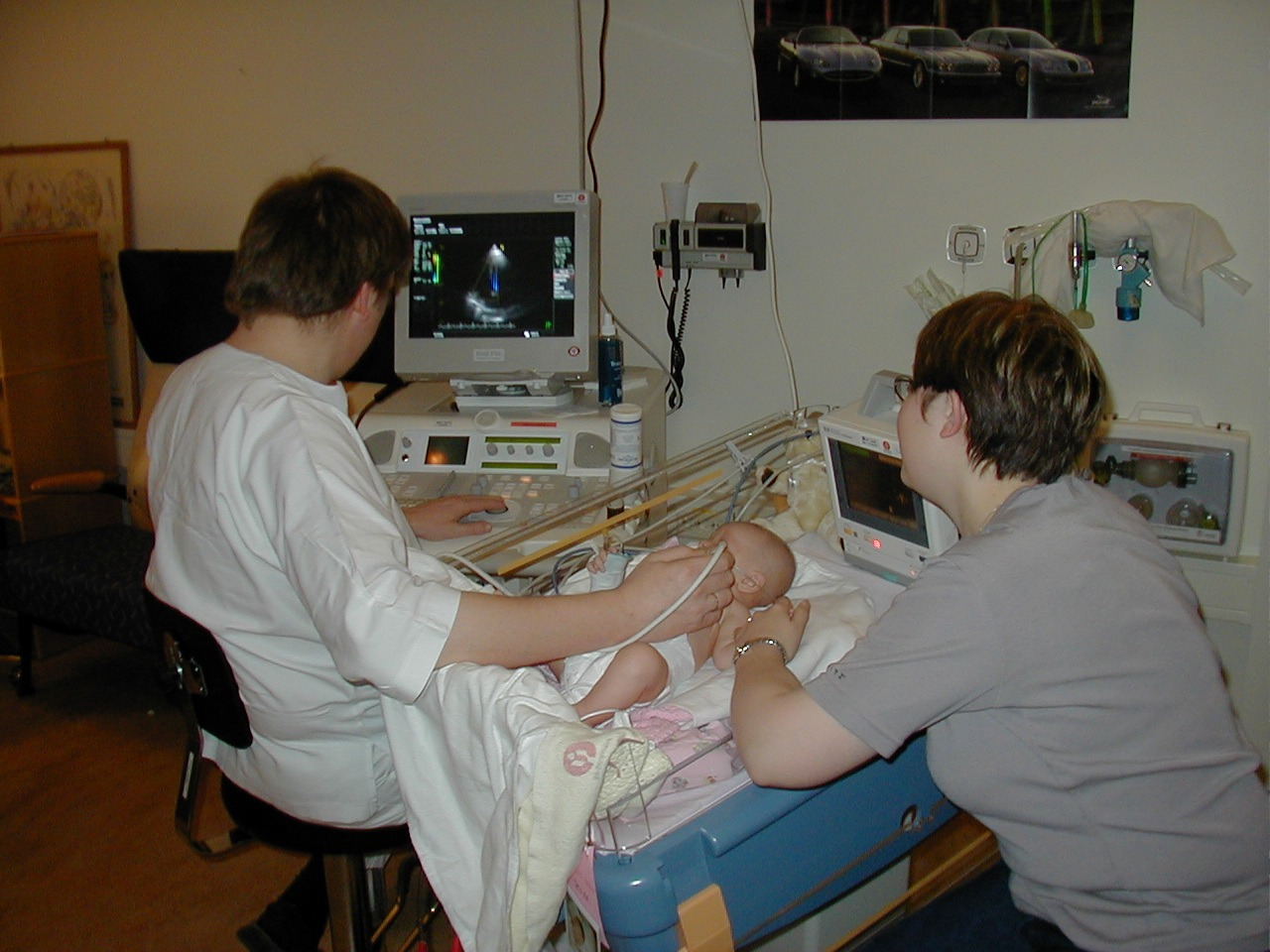
A sonographer performing pediatric echocardiography

A sonographer is an allied healthcare professional who specializes in the use of ultrasonic imaging devices to produce diagnostic images, scans, videos or three-dimensional volumes of anatomy and diagnostic data. The requirements for clinical practice vary greatly by country. Sonography requires specialized education and skills to acquire, analyze and optimize information in the image. Due to the high levels of decisional latitude and diagnostic input, sonographers have a high degree of responsibility in the diagnostic process. Many countries require medical sonographers to have professional certification. Sonographers have core knowledge in ultrasound physics, cross-sectional anatomy, physiology, and pathology.

A sonologist is a medical doctor who has undergone additional medical ultrasound training to diagnose and treat diseases. Sonologist is licensed to perform and write ultrasound imaging reports independently or verifies a sonographer's report, prescribe medications and medical certificates, and give clinical consultations.

A sonologist may practice in multiple modalities or specialize in only one field, such as obstetric, gynecology, heart, emergency and vascular ultrasound.

== Terminology ==
Prior to 1970, many individuals performed sonography for research purposes and those assisting with the imaging were considered technicians or technologists, and in 1973 in the United States the occupation of diagnostic medical technology was established as sonography become more widely used within healthcare settings. Today, sonographer is the preferred term for the allied healthcare professionals who perform diagnostic medical sonography, or diagnostic ultrasound. The alternative term "ultrasonographer" is much less commonly used.

== Training and licensing ==
=== Australia ===
The Australian Sonographers Association (ASA) was formed in 1992 in response to the desire of sonographers across Australia for an organisation that represents and considers issues important to sonographers in the Australian healthcare environment. The ASA has more than 5000 individual member sonographers from Australia and New Zealand, and about 30 corporate partners. The ASA has pledged to pursue high standards within the practice of medical sonography, and has a structure of a board of directors and multiple representative branches in all Australian states and New Zealand.

Australian sonographers must be accredited by the Australian Sonographers Accreditation Registry (ASAR), whose brief is to accredit and reaccredit on a regular basis, postgraduate ultrasound programs offered by Australian universities, and to establish the criteria against which those programs and any other future Australian and New Zealand programs are to be judged. In addition, a register of accredited medical sonographers and accredited student sonographers is maintained and their continuing professional development activities monitored and recorded.

The Health Insurance Commissison in association with the ASAR introduced in 2002 a program of accreditation and continuing professional education for sonographers. The ASAR recognises registration with the Australian Orthoptic Board as appropriate accreditation for orthoptists to undertake sonography in relation to ocular structures.

=== Canada ===
The vast majority of Canadian sonographers have received their education through an accredited sonography program. Many programs are available across the country and may include direct-entry programs for degrees, advanced diplomas, and second-discipline graduate certificate programs. Sonography Canada registers sonographers in three credentials: generalist, cardiac, and vascular. To become registered, eligible candidates must successfully meet Sonography Canada's clinical (Canadian Clinical Skills Assessment) and academic requirements. Sonography Canada-credentialed sonographers must also document their continuing education by maintaining a minimum 40 continuing professional development credits every three years.

The Nova Scotia Society of Diagnostic Medical Sonographers is currently working with the Nova Scotia Association of Medical Radiation Technologists to add diagnostic ultrasound as a new discipline in the proposed college. This means that diagnostic sonography would become a self-regulated profession in Nova Scotia, along with radiography, nuclear medicine, magnetic resonance imaging, and radiation therapy. The Department of Health is now considering their application; the appropriate act and associated regulations have been drafted, and the associations are aiming for approval at the spring 2012 session of the legislature.

=== United Kingdom ===
In the UK, sonographers are also responsible for the interpretation of the images and issue diagnostic reports. They are educated to a high level, and their training is delivered as a MSc/PGDip/PGCert by the universities and overseen by the Consortium for Accreditation of Sonographic Education; as training is delivered at postgraduate level, all sonographers must have a bachelor's degree or equivalent prior to undertaking this specialty, and this means training can take a minimum of 4 years. Currently, no requirement exists for a sonographer to be state registered in the UK, although the majority are registered with the Health and Care Professions Council (HCPC) as a radiographer. State registration of sonographers in their own right is being eagerly sought by the profession. However, the HCPC has previously sought to require statutory registration of sonographers, a motion supported by a number of professional bodies, and the HCPC was rejected by the Department of Health. The rationale for this rejection remains controversial, but a voluntary registry is currently maintained by the College of Radiographers.

Within the United Kingdom, sonographers are employed by hospitals within the National Health Service and by private companies offering healthcare services.

=== United States ===
The profession is subdivided in specialties such as cardiac, obstetrical, vascular, and general sonographers. General sonographers are registered in abdominal and/or obstetric and gynecologic sonography. Around 1 1/2 years may be needed to get a degree in diagnostic medical sonography. In the United States, the most widely accepted sonographic education is provided by CAAHEP/JRC-DMS accredited programs.

The American Society of Ultrasound Technical Specialists, now the Society of Diagnostic Medical Sonography, was founded in 1970 as the primary professional society for sonographers. The two credentialing bodies in the United States for sonographers are the Cardiovascular Credentialing International established in 1968 and the American Registry for Diagnostic Medical Sonography (ARDMS) established in 1975. Accreditation is granted through the American National Standards Institute. Recognition of ARDMS programs in providing credentials has also earned the ARDMS accreditation with the National Commission for Certifying Agencies, which is the accrediting arm of the National Organization for Competency Assurance (NOCA). Established in 1977 as a nonprofit organization, NOCA sets quality standards for certifying organizations.

In 2009, New Mexico and Oregon became the first two states to require licensure of sonographers, and as of 2023, licensure is also required in New Hampshire and North Dakota.

== Work-related injury ==
The occupational risks associated with performing sonography were reported as early as 1985, but it wasn't until the mid-1990's that work-related injuries were widely recognized as a significant problem among sonographers. During their careers, up to 90% of sonographers report experiencing some form of work-related musculoskeletal discomfort. Beginning 2020's, the impact of psychological strain became widely documented, with a prevalence of occupational burnout appearing in greater than 50% of sonographers. The combined physical and psychological effects on the profession were accelerated by strain and shifts on the healthcare system during and following the COVID-19 pandemic, resulting in highented concerns as to the sustainability of the sonogarpher workforce for ensuring widespread access to high quality diagnostic services.

Work-related musculoskeletal injuries are most common in the hand, shoulder, and neck. Injuries are often due to scanning in compromised positions, incorrect gripping of the transducer, spending too much time manipulating the transducer on technically difficult exams such as obese or large pregnant patients, and a lack of upper body fitness, but injuries also result from various organizational, administrative, equipment and other factors that are outside of the sonographer's control. Implementation of ergonomic principles, including adjustments to equipment, to perform imaging tasks in low-strain postures is critical to reducing the risk of injury. Additionally, stretching and exercise protocols have been suggested to be a useful tool in reducing the risk of musculoskeletal injury, pain, and repetitive strain injury in sonographers. Finally, promoting both physical and psychological health among sonographers requires representation and acknowledgment of challenges facing the workforce across the entire work organization. Solutions must include supportive orgainzational policies and administrative procedures within the work setting, such as allowance for regular work breaks, uninterrupted workflow, and supervisor support.

Multiple professional societies have developed guidelines to address the pervasive problem of work-related injuries among sonographers. The first of these actions was a consensus conference held in 2003 and repeated in 2016 by the Society of Diagnostic Medical Sonography that resulted in the development of Industry Standards for the Prevention of Work-Related Musculoskeletal Disorders in Sonography. These standards primarily focused on the ergonomic design of equipment and the responsibilities of employers and employees in addressing injury prevention. The American Institute of Ultrasound in Medicine has also released guidelines that extend these standards by describing imaging exam-specific recommendations and discussing the role of quality improvement practices by healthcare organizations.

In 2019, an alliance of eight professional societies, credentialing bodies, and accreditation organizations in the United States came together to create the Work-Related Musculoskeletal Disorder (WRMSD) Grand Challenge with a goal to stop WRMSDs resulting from the performance of diagnostic medical ultrasound. This alliance has supported design challenges and the creation of a research registry of sonographers to monitor the status of work-related injuries in the profession, examine risk factors, and develop solutions to remediate the pervasive issue.

== See also ==
- Medical ultrasound
- Diagnostic medical sonography
- Medical imaging
- Radiologist
