= Lawrence Johnston =

Lawrence Johnston is the name of:

- Lawrence W. Johnston (1871–1958), British garden designer and plantsman
- Lawrence H. Johnston (1918–2011), American physicist
- Lawrence P. Johnston, American architect, a designer of Glenn Dale Hospital
