= Larry R. Johnson =

American meteorologist (1944–1998)

- Born: Larry Richard Johnson; 6 May 1944; Klemme, Iowa, U.S.
- Died: 30 July 1998 (aged 54); Herndon, Virginia, U.S.
- Resting place: Arlington National Cemetery
- Education: Mason City Junior College; University of Wisconsin–Madison (BS); Air Command and Staff College
- Occupations: Military officer; meteorologist
- Spouse(s): Ruth Ann Frelund (m. 1966) Laurel E.
- Children: 2

Larry Richard Johnson (6 May 1944 – 30 July 1998) was an American meteorologist and military officer of the United States Air Force's Air Weather Service. He later worked as a meteorologist for Litton PRC Inc.

== Early life ==
Larry Richard Johnson was born on 6 May 1944 in Klemme, Iowa, to Minnie (née Hansen) and Harold A. Johnson. He graduated from Klemme High School in 1962. He then graduated from Mason City Junior College in 1964. He graduated with a Bachelor of Science in meteorology and a master's degree from the University of Wisconsin–Madison. He attended the college under the United States Air Force's Airman Education and Commissioning Program. In 1982, he graduated from the Air Command and Staff College.

== Career ==
Johnson worked at the Klemme Coop Grain Company. He also worked for Marshall and Swift Inc. of Mason City, Iowa. In 1965, Johnson joined the United States Air Force. He served in the Air Force's Air Weather Service for 23 years. He was a rawinsonde observer at Tinker Air Force Base. He was a command briefer at Udorn Royal Thai Air Force Base and Nakhon Phanom Royal Thai Navy Base in Thailand. He also served as plans and manpower staff officer at Air Force Systems Command at Andrews Air Force Base. He was the chief of the Computer Graphics Section and Mission Applications Branch, as well as the assistant operations officer and the special projects forecaster at the Air Force Global Weather Central at Offutt Air Force Base. He was the chief of the Weather Assignments Office at the Air Force Personnel Center in Randolph Air Force Base. He was promoted to lieutenant colonel on 1 August 1985. He was then director of Weather Systems Acquisition of the Air Weather Service at Scott Air Force Base. He retired on 1 August 1988 at the rank of lieutenant colonel. He was a recipient of the Air Force Commendation Medal and the Air Force Meritorious Medal.

Johnson worked at Litton PRC Inc. for 10 years. He worked on the Advanced Weather Interactive Processing System (AWIPS). He also worked as a principal applications scientist, department manager, executive manager, and deputy program manager. He was known as "Mr. AWIPS" at Litton PRC. He was a founding member of the National Weather Association, serving as its vice president in 1992 and its president in 1995.

== Personal life ==
Johnson married Ruth Ann Frelund, daughter of Selmund O. Frelund, of Mason City in June 1966. They had two daughters, Julie and Heather. He later married Laurel E.

Johnson died on 30 July 1998 at his home in Herndon, Virginia. He was buried in Arlington National Cemetery with military honors.

== Legacy ==
The National Weather Association named an award after Johnson for his contributions to operational meteorology. Litton PRC and the American Meteorological Society established the Larry R. Johnson Memorial Minority Scholarship.
