= New Media Consortium =

International 501(c)(3) not-for-profit organization

The New Media Consortium (NMC) was an international 501(c)(3) not-for-profit consortium of learning-focused organizations dedicated to the exploration and use of new media and new technologies.

== History ==
The New Media Consortium (NMC) was founded in 1993 by a group of hardware manufacturers, software developers, and publishers who felt that the ultimate success of their multimedia-capable products depended upon their acceptance by the higher education community.

Those 22 institutions initiated a number of collaborative activities, and their working group — then called the New Media Centers — quickly evolved into an independent not-for-profit 501(c)(3) corporation by early 1994, with headquarters in San Francisco. In 2002, the NMC moved its national headquarters from San Francisco, CA to Austin, TX.

In December 2017 the organization announced in an email that it was ceasing operations and filing for Chapter 7 bankruptcy. The statement blamed the closure on "apparent errors and omissions by its former Controller and Chief Financial Officer." The involvement of the board of Directors, the Board Officers and especially the Treasurer, or the Executive Director in the events that led to the NMC's demise remained unclear in the aftermath of the dissolution.

== Board of directors ==
Members and officers at the time of the announcement

- Gardner Campbell, Chair. Associate Prof. of English, Virginia Commonwealth University
- Don Henderson, Vice Chair. Senior Manager, Creative Expression, Apple Inc.
- Joan K. Lippincott, Treasurer. Associate Executive Director, Coalition for Networked Information
- Liz Neely, Secretary. Senior Director, Integrated Content, American Alliance of Museums (AAM)
- A. Michael Berman , Board Member. VP Technology & Communication, California State University, Channel Islands
- Kyle Bowen, Board Member. Director, Educational Technology, Pennsylvania State University
- Crista Copp, Board Member. Director of Educational Technology Services & Support, Loyola Marymount University
- Christina Engelbart, Board Member. Executive Director, Doug Engelbart Institute
- Cynthia Golden, Board Member. Director, University Center for Teaching & Learning, University of Pittsburgh
- Marco Torres, Board Member. Director of Story, Digital Promise

== Senior Staff ==
As of December, 2017

- Executive Director — Eden Dahlstrom
- Senior Director, Financial Services and Controller — Anne Treadway, CPA
- Senior Director, Communications — Samantha Becker
- Senior Director, Membership and Special Projects — Alex Freeman
- Senior Director, CTO — Gordon Jackson

== Offices ==
The NMC had offices in Texas in the United States. The final headquarters office was in Austin, Texas.

== See also ==
- New Media Council
- New media art
