= Havilah Babcock =

American manufacturer (1837–1905)

- Born: September 8, 1837; Franklin, Vermont, U.S.
- Died: April 21, 1905 (aged 67); Neenah, Wisconsin, U.S.
- Occupation: Manufacturing Executive
- Spouse: Frances Kimberly Babcock (m. 1872)
- Children: 5
- Parent(s): Marvin Kinney Babcock; Elmira Wheeler Babcock

Havilah Babcock (September 8, 1837 – April 21, 1905) was an American manufacturing executive and a joint founder of the Kimberly-Clark Corporation.

== Early life ==
Born in Franklin, Vermont, Babcock moved with his family to Waukesha, Wisconsin, in 1846. In 1849 they moved again to Neenah, Wisconsin, his father had gotten a contract to excavate and construct the Neenah portion of the Fox-Wisconsin Waterway.

At age 12 he became a child laborer in his father's project, thus bringing an end to Babcock's education. Following his mother's death in 1851 and the completion of the waterway project in 1852, Babcock found work as a box boy at a local dry goods store where he also slept at night, as his widowed father had begun farming with a new wife six miles from town. At age 16 Babcock was promoted to clerk, in which he achieved notable success selling dress goods to women.

In 1857 due to his success in sales, the wealthy father of his friend John A. Kimberly set the two young men up as equal partners in the Kimberly & Babcock Dry Goods Store, providing them with $5,000 in new goods. The business was an immediate success, and while still only in their teens, the partnership was quickly recognized as a formidable teaming of talent, leading to directorships with the newly organized First National Bank of Neenah (what is today Associated Banc-Corp), and to the construction in 1869 of the Reliance Mill, the largest flour mill constructed in Neenah, which helped make it the second largest flour milling center in the state behind Milwaukee, Wisconsin.

In 1876 Babcock became a financial partner in the founding of the Bergstrom Brothers Stove Works under the direction of D. W. Bergstrom, a former clerk at Kimberly & Babcock. At the time of his death Babcock was planning to be a partner in the founding of the Bergstrom Paper Company.

== Kimberly-Clark ==
Shortly after the Reliance Mill was up and running, Kimberly became interested in the manufacture of paper, and on the strength of his partnership with Babcock the two men brought together a group of investors to form a joint stock company. After several unsuccessful attempts at organization with a changing roster of players, the large number of prospective shareholders was cut down to four equal partners: Kimberly, Babcock, Charles B. Clark, and Franklyn C. Shattuck. Organized as Kimberly, Clark & Company in 1872, their guiding principle was that they would function as an interchangeable yet complementary team of players, much in the same way Kimberly and Babcock had in their dry goods business. Initially, however, construction of a mill and the operational start up were undertaken by Kimberly and Clark. Shattuck continued operation of his Chicago-based wholesaling business, while Babcock took charge of the businesses he held in partnership with Kimberly. These arrangements lasted only until 1878 when the company undertook a major expansion in neighboring Appleton, Wisconsin.

At this point the dry goods store was sold to help finance the expansion. Clark had begun a political career, Babcock and Shattuck took on active roles in daily operations. Incorporated in 1880 as Kimberly & Clark Co., Babcock was named vice-president and resumed the close partnership with Kimberly that had launched both their careers. In the decade that followed the company pursued an aggressive program of expansion at mill sites along the Fox River, concluding in 1890 at De Pere, Wisconsin with the Shattuck & Babcock Paper Mill, the largest producer of fine writing papers in the U.S. As a result of these efforts Kimberly & Clark transformed the surrounding valley into one of the leading centers of paper production in the U.S.

By the turn of the century both Clark and Shattuck had died, and soon afterwards Kimberly retired to Redlands, California, leaving Babcock as the only original partner on site during a period of violent labor strikes and a protracted lawsuit brought against Kimberly & Clark and other paper manufacturers under the Sherman Antitrust Act. The strain of these years contributed to Babcock's death in 1905 at a Winnetka, Illinois sanitarium, where he had been taken by his family to recover his health. The importance of Babcock's role in the company's founding was recognized in 2015 when he was inducted into the Paper Industry International Hall of Fame, maintained by the Paper Discovery Center in the former Atlas Mill, built during Babcock's vice presidency.

== Personal life ==
Babcock (who was a devout Presbyterian) early success in dry goods was due in part to his physical attributes. In the decades before the Civil War women did not generally shop in public except in dry goods stores, a fact which New York's Alexander Turney Stewart turned into one of history's largest personal fortunes by hiring handsome young men to clerk in his Manhattan department store. Babcock, standing six feet tall with the brooding good looks of a Midwestern Heathcliff (Wuthering Heights), similarly assisted a dedicated following of local women in adapting current fashions to flatter their personal attributes. Best known among his followers was the wife of territorial governor James Duane Doty.

A voracious reader in spite of his limited education, and possessed of artistic sensibilities, Babcock was also a talented tenor and soloist in his church choir. He initially hoped to marry his partner's sister, Emma Kimberly, but when she rejected his proposal Babcock turned his attentions to their cousin Frances Kimberly, a graduate of the Emma Willard School, and upon whom he called at her home in Watervliet, New York while in the East buying goods for the store. The two married in 1872, and on their wedding tour visited Babcock's cousin Orville E. Babcock, the personal secretary of Ulysses S. Grant who was later indicted in the Whiskey Ring.

Together the Babcocks raised five children: Helen, Caroline, Henry, George and Elizabeth. Although it pained him to be separated from them, all five became graduates of Eastern colleges, his daughter Caroline also studying sculpture under Daniel Chester French at his studio in Manhattan, and later at the School of the Art Institute of Chicago. Caroline would later become a Presbyterian missionary in Korea with her husband James Edward Adams. A great hunter and fisherman, Babcock encouraged a taste for the out-of-doors in his children, taking them and their friends on annual camping parties at Eagle River, Wisconsin. His interests as a genealogist, music lover and Anglophile were similarly shared with his children, all but one of them as adults still living at home at his death in 1905.

Three of Babcock's children subsequently married and only two had children, his granddaughter Anne becoming the wife of Theodore Roosevelt III. Those children that remained in Neenah were either founders or major contributors to the YWCA, the Boys' Brigade, Theda Clark Hospital, the Bergstrom-Mahler Museum, the Emergency Society, Oak Hill Cemetery, the First Presbyterian Church and the Visiting Nurse Association.

More than 100 years since his death, Babcock's Bible study class - which was composed entirely of women - still meets at the First Presbyterian Church of Neenah and is known today as the Friends Class.

== Havilah Babcock House ==
In addition to his association with the founding of Kimberly-Clark Corporation, Babcock is known for his role in the construction and decoration of the Havilah Babcock House. Upon the sale of the dry goods store in 1878, Babcock focused his creativity on the construction of a family home on Neenah's East Wisconsin Avenue. The land was purchased in 1879, after which William Waters (architect) of neighboring Oshkosh, Wisconsin drew up the plans for a Queen Anne residence. Construction commenced in 1881 with Babcock acting as construction manager, personally selecting tiles, stained glass, woodwork and furnishings in Milwaukee, Chicago and New York City. Two years later, while the newly incorporated Kimberly & Clark was building a third mill in Appleton, the family moved in with the interior still largely bare plaster walls. Ultimately the first house in Neenah fitted with electricity (the Kimberly & Clark generator serving as the power source), the interior decoration was completed under Babcock's watchful eye in 1888, with the parlor carefully replicating decorations he and his wife had seen and admired at the Centennial Exhibition in 1876.

At the time William Morris, Charles Eastlake, Henry Hudson Holly and other leaders of the Aesthetic Movement were encouraging the use of instructive narratives in fireplace tiles, advice which Babcock subtly extended to whole rooms through his choices not only of tiles but stained glass, wall coverings, and even the placement of selected paintings and objet d'art. Principal among the stories were those of the Etruscan goddess Pomona (mythology) and William Morris' "The Defence of Guenevere," both of which challenge the conventional roles and identities of men and women, and which taken together Babcock wove into a devotional to the love he and his wife Frances shared.

Their daughters Helen and Elizabeth, who inherited the house upon their mother's death in 1917, were unaware of these narratives but were loath to change anything their father had done. As a result, the Havilah Babcock House remains almost exactly as it was at Babcock's death. It is today held in a family trust, with the current occupants being Babcock's great-grandson Peter Adams and his wife, Patricia Mulvey. The house was listed on the National Register of Historic Places in 1974.

In 2010 it was identified by the Wisconsin Historical Society as one of the 20 most important homes in the state, along with Frank Lloyd Wright's Wingspread, Milwaukee's Pabst Mansion, and Ten Chimneys, the home of Broadway legends Alfred Lunt and Lynn Fontanne. The designation served as the basis of the Wisconsin Historical Society Press book, "Wisconsin's Own," by Louis Wasserman and Caron Connelly. Six of these homes, including the Havilah Babcock House, were featured in the 2015 Wisconsin Public Television documentary, "Remarkable Homes of Wisconsin."

== See also ==
- John A. Kimberly
- Charles B. Clark
- Franklyn C. Shattuck
