= John A. Kimberly =

American manufacturer (1838–1928)

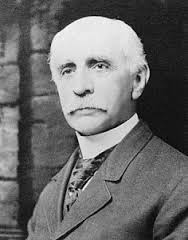
- Born: John Alfred Kimberly; July 18, 1838; Troy, New York, U.S.
- Died: January 21, 1928 (aged 89); Redlands, California, U.S.
- Resting place: Oak Hill Cemetery; Neenah, Wisconsin
- Education: Lawrence University
- Occupations: Co-founder and president of Kimberly-Clark Corporation
- Spouse: Helen Cheney Kimberly (1845–1932)
- Children: 7, including Mary Kimberly Shirk

John Alfred Kimberly (July 18, 1838 – January 21, 1928) was an American manufacturing executive, a founder of Kimberly-Clark Corporation of Neenah, Wisconsin.

== Early life and education ==
Born in Troy, New York, he moved with his family to Wisconsin at age nine and settled in Neenah. Before moving west, he had obtained the rudiments of an education in the schools of Troy, and his education was completed in the pioneer schools of Neenah and at Lawrence University in Appleton.

== Career ==
In 1872, Kimberly and Havilah Babcock formed a partnership with Charles B. Clark and Franklyn C. Shattuck. Each man contributed $7,500 to capitalize Kimberly-Clark & Company and built the Globe Mill, the first newsprint mill in Wisconsin. In the first 25 years of its existence, the company expanded from one mill with a two ton-per-day capacity to 14 mills and a daily capacity of 150 tons.

== Death and legacy ==
Kimberly was still president of the company in 1928 when he died in his ninetieth year at his home in Redlands, California. The village of Kimberly in Wisconsin is named after him.
