= John Williams Tobey =

American politician

John Williams Tobey (August 3, 1827 – February 4, 1909) was an American architect, carpenter and builder from Neenah, Wisconsin. He served as mayor of Neenah, and served one term as an independent member of the Wisconsin State Assembly from Winnebago County.

== Background ==
Tobey was born in Hawley, Massachusetts, on August 3, 1827, son of John and Sybil (Lathrop) Tobey. He received a public school education and went into the trades of architect, carpenter and builder. He moved to Cleveland, Ohio, in 1846, and lived in Cuyahoga and Lorain counties in that state. During the American Civil War, he tried to enlist in the Ohio National Guard but was rejected by the examining surgeon. He moved to Wisconsin in 1864, settling in Neenah. He designed the plans for the Russell House in Neenah and superintended the erection of it, as well as the Neenah High School and the Patten Mill at Appleton.

== Public office ==
Tobey held various local offices such as county supervisor and alderman, and was elected mayor of the City of Neenah in April 1886. He described his political position as having been brought up in the "Jeffersonian and Jacksonian school of politics, and believes in law being founded on equal rights in the strictest sense, and fearlessly executed." Tobey was elected as an independent to the second Winnebago County Assembly district (the Towns of Neenah, Menasha, Clayton, Winchester, Winneconne, and Vinland; and the Cities of Neenah and Menasha) in 1886, with 1,408 votes to 1,185 for former State Representative and State Senator William P. Rounds, (a Republican), and 157 votes for Prohibitionist E. W. Clark. Incumbent Charles B. Clark (also a former mayor of Neenah) was not a candidate, as he was (successfully) pursuing a campaign for Congress. Tobey was appointed to the standing committee on medical societies. Tobey was reported in some press accounts to be a Democrat.

He did not run for re-election in 1887 and was succeeded by Republican Walter L. Miller.

Tobey ran for his old Assembly seat in 1890 as a Democrat but lost to Neenah mayor Samuel A. Cook, who received 1326 votes to 1042 for Tobey and 63 for Prohibitionist Lucius Webster.

== Personal life ==
Tobey married Lucey D. Smith, also from Massachusetts, in Cuyahoga Co., Ohio, in 1853. Lucey Tobey died suddenly on May 31, 1890, at the age of 57, leaving John with two children, Isora and Mary. Isora died on April 13, 1893, of "consumption".

Tobey was a member of the Royal Arcanum.

He died February 4, 1909, while in Cuyahoga County, Ohio.
