= Charles B. Clark =

American politician

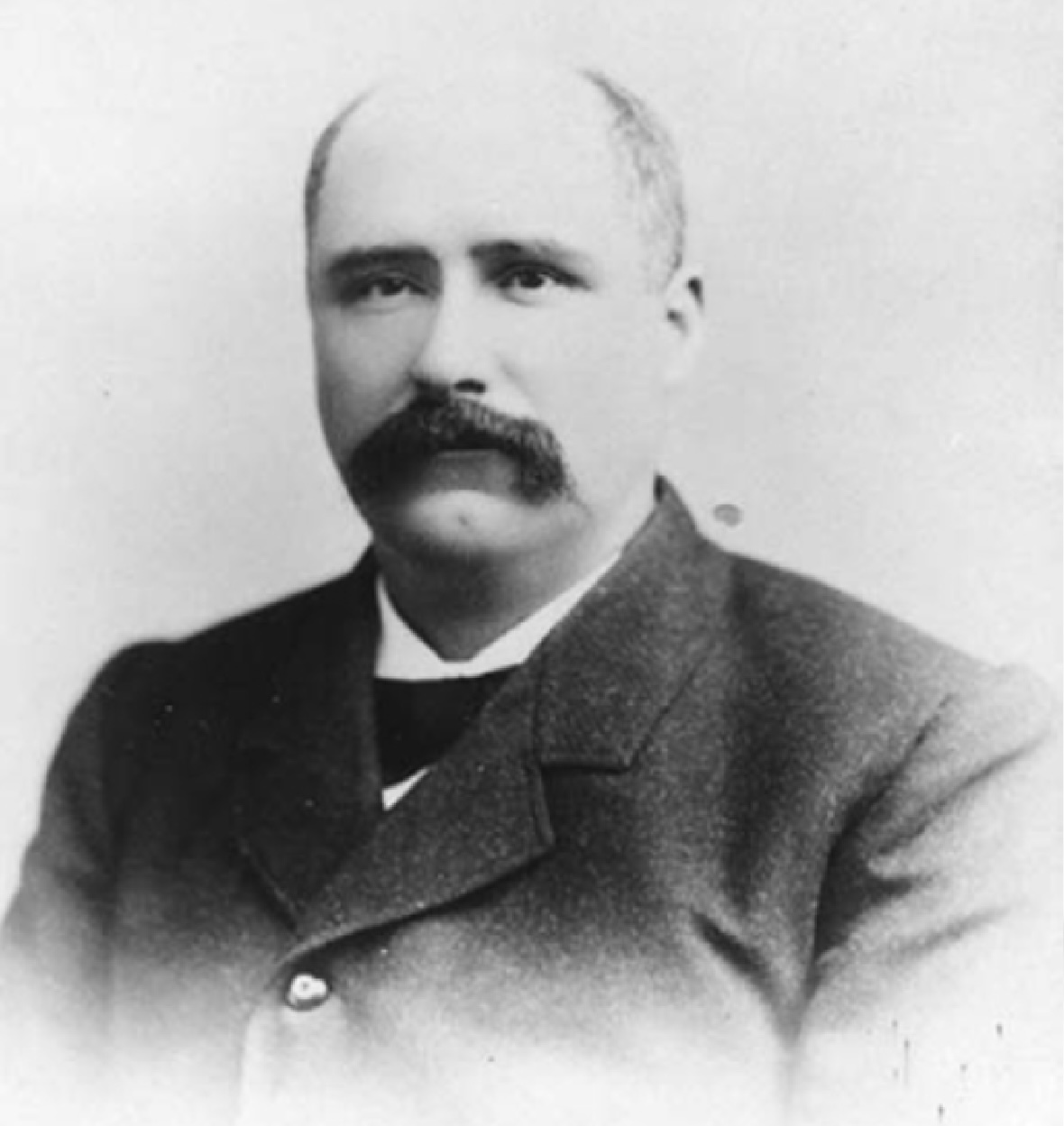

Member of the U.S. House of Representatives from Wisconsin's 6th district
- In office March 4, 1887 – March 3, 1891
- Preceded by: Richard W. Guenther
- Succeeded by: Lucas Miltiades Miller

Member of the Wisconsin State Assembly from the Winnebago 2nd district
- In office January 1, 1885 – January 1, 1887
- Preceded by: Peter Vredenburgh
- Succeeded by: John Williams Tobey

Mayor of Neenah, Wisconsin
- In office 1880–1883

Personal details
- Born: Charles Benjamin Clark; August 24, 1844 Theresa, New York, U.S.
- Died: September 10, 1891 (aged 47) Watertown, New York U.S.
- Cause of death: Bright's disease
- Resting place: Oak Hill Cemetery; Neenah, Wisconsin
- Party: Republican
- Spouse(s): Caroline F. Hubbard Clark (1844–1922) (m. 1867–1891, his death)
- Children: 2
- Profession: Merchant, manufacturing (paper) executive

Military service
- Allegiance: United States
- Branch/service: United States Army; Union Army
- Years of service: 1862–1865
- Rank: 1st Lieutenant
- Unit: 21st Wis. Vol. Infantry
- Battles/wars: American Civil War

Charles Benjamin Clark (August 24, 1844 – September 10, 1891) was a U.S. representative from Wisconsin and one of the founders of the Kimberly-Clark Corporation in Neenah with John A. Kimberly, Franklyn C. Shattuck, and Havilah Babcock.

== Early life ==
Born in Theresa, New York, Clark attended the common schools. He moved to Wisconsin in 1855 with his widowed mother, who settled in Neenah, Wisconsin. The American Civil War began in 1861 when he was sixteen, and he enlisted in Company I, Twenty-first Regiment, Wisconsin Volunteer Infantry, when it was formed and served with the same unit, rising from private to first sergeant to first lieutenant. After the war, he was elected as a companion of the Military Order of the Loyal Legion of the United States.

== Career ==
Clark engaged in mercantile pursuits, banking, and the manufacture of paper, notably Clark was a founder of the Kimberly-Clark Corporation in 1872. He served as mayor of Neenah (1880–83), was a member of its city council from 1883 to 1885, and became a Republican member of the Wisconsin State Assembly in 1885.

Clark was elected as a Republican to the Fiftieth and Fifty-first Congresses (March 1887 – March 1891).

== Death and legacy ==
An unsuccessful candidate for reelection in 1890, he died of Brights Disease the following September at age 47 at Watertown, New York, while on a visit to his old home. Clark was interred in Wisconsin at Oak Hill Cemetery in Neenah.

ThedaCare Regional Medical Center-Neenah, opened in 1909 as Theda Clark Memorial Hospital, was named for his eldest child. Theda Clark Peters (1871–1903) died after childbirth at home at age 32 and the Clark family established the hospital.

U.S. House of Representatives
Preceded by Richard W. Guenther	Member of the U.S. House of Representatives from Wisconsin's 6th congressional district March 4, 1887 - March 3, 1891	Succeeded by Lucas Miltiades Miller
