= Charles R. Smith House =

Historic house in Wisconsin, United States

- U.S. National Register of Historic Places
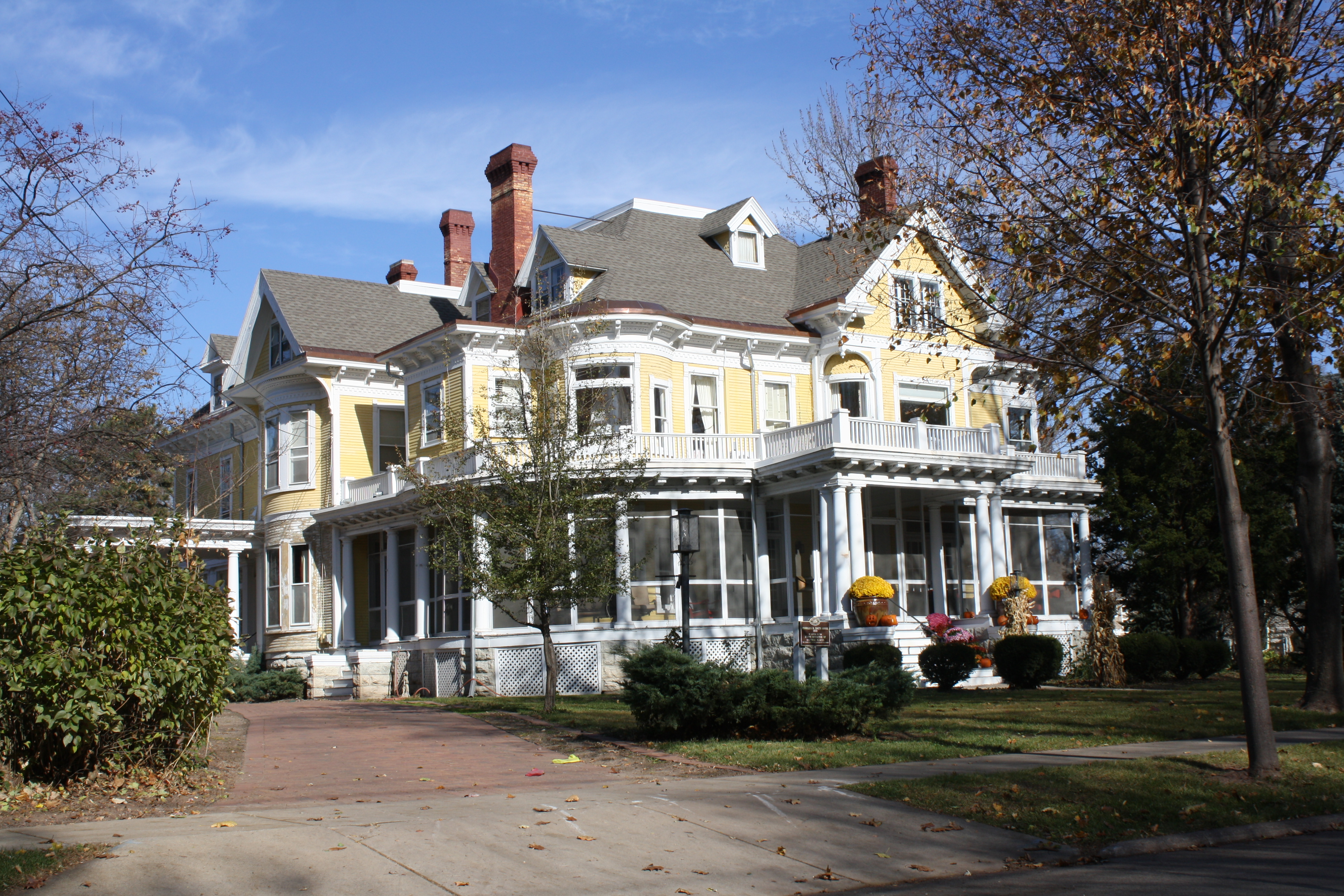
- Charles R. Smith House
- Location: 824 E. Forest Ave., Neenah, Wisconsin
- Coordinates: 44°11′26″N 88°26′42″W
- Area: 2.8 acres (1.1 ha)
- Built: 1890, 1891
- Architectural style: Queen Anne
- NRHP reference No.: 79000122
- Added to NRHP: July 16, 1979

The Charles R. Smith House is located in Neenah, Wisconsin.

== History ==
Charles R. Smith was a son of pioneer and industrialist Elisha D. Smith. The house was added to the National Register of Historic Places in 1979 and to the State Register of Historic Places in 1989.

Also known as the Shepard House or the Keith House. Due to yellow exterior color and green awnings, was also known as the Packer House.

Built in 1890 with addition in 1891 in the Queen Anne style. Sits on almost 3 acres on Doty Island in Neenah, WI. Property includes Gazebo, swimming pool, tennis court and a 9,000 ft/sq carriage house.

It is located within the East Forest Avenue Historic District. The nearby home of Smith's brother, known as the Henry Spencer Smith House, is also listed on both registers.
