= Ryan G. Van Cleave =

American poet (born 1972)

- Born: Ryan Van Cleave; 1972 (age 53–54); Neenah, Wisconsin, U.S.
- Education: Northern Illinois University; Florida State University
- Occupation: Poet
- Writing career
- Subject: Poetry

Ryan Van Cleave (born 1972 in Neenah, Wisconsin) is an American freelance writer, writing coach, and keynote speaker. He runs the creative writing program at the Ringling College of Art and Design in Florida.

== Life ==
Van Cleave was raised in the Chicago suburbs. He taught creative writing at a number of US universities including Florida State University, the University of Wisconsin–Green Bay, the University of Wisconsin–Madison, and Clemson University. He is the author of twenty books, including the creative writing textbook Contemporary American Poetry: Behind the Scenes, Memoir Writing for Dummies, and The Weekend Book Proposal: How to Write a Winning Proposal in 48 Hours and Sell Your Book. His work has been published in The Christian Science Monitor, The Iowa Review, Harvard Review, Mid American Review, The Missouri Review, Puerto del Sol, Ploughshares, The Progressive, Southern Humanities Review, TriQuarterly, and Writer's Digest.

In 2006 he co-founded C&R Press (with fellow writer Chad Prevost), a non-profit literary organization that publishes early career poets and offers free community writing workshops throughout the Southeastern US. He currently works as a freelance writer, writing coach, and script doctor in Sarasota, Florida; he is also a professor of liberal arts at Ringling College of Art + Design and a contributing writer for Sarasota Scene Magazine and The Writer.

In 2010, he published Unplugged: My Journey into the Dark World of Video Game Addiction, which was the first memoir on video game addiction; subsequently he became a popular speaker on digital media addiction and recovery at schools, conferences, and corporate events. After learning that a chair he sat in at Northern Illinois University had bullet holes in it after Steven Kazmierczak's school shooting on February 14, 2008, Van Cleave wrote a young adult book about gun violence in schools called Unlocked. This book received a Gold Medal in Young Adult Literature from the Florida Book Awards and was named a Quick Pick for Reluctant Readers by the American Library Association. About writing for young audiences, Van Cleave says, "They're the best audience in the world. They read for the pure pleasure of it, and they're at a crucial point in their lives where the right book at the right time can change everything for them."

== Awards ==
- Van Cleave was the 2000-2001 Anastasia C. Hoffman Poetry Fellow at the University of Wisconsin–Madison's Institute of Creative Writing.
- He was the 2007-2008 Jenny McKean Moore Writer-in-Washington at George Washington University.
- His poem Aesculapius in the Underworld was included in The Year's Best Fantasy and Horror (St. Martin's, 2002).
- In 2000, he was an Edward H. and Marie C. Kingsbury Fellow at Florida State University.
- His YA book Unlocked received a Gold Medal in Young Adult Literature from the Florida Book Awards (2011).

== Education ==
Van Cleave obtained a B.A. in English from Northern Illinois University in 1994, an M.A. in American literature from Florida State University in 1997, and a Ph.D. in American literature/creative writing from Florida State University in 2001.

== Works ==
=== Poetry ===
- "Epistaxis—n., Med., a nosebleed" from Ploughshares
- "Mensa Bob's Father" from Sonora Review
- "Lesson #2" from New York Quarterly
- "Cultural Piracy" from North American Review
- Ha Ha Tonka: A Book of Rune. Higganum Hill Books. 2003. ISBN 978-0-9635185-7-6.
- Imagine the Dawn: The Civil War Sonnets. Wordtech Communications. 2005. ISBN 978-1-932339-92-5.
- The magical breasts of Britney Spears. Red Hen Press. 2006. ISBN 978-1-59709-067-4.

=== Editor ===
- Virgil Suárez; Ryan G. Van Cleave, eds. (2001). American Diaspora: Poetry of Displacement. University of Iowa Press. ISBN 978-0-87745-746-6.
- Virgil Suárez; Ryan G. Van Cleave, eds. (2002). Like Thunder: Poets Respond to Violence in America. University of Iowa Press. ISBN 978-0-87745-791-6.
- Virgil Suárez; Ryan G. Van Cleave, eds. (2003). Vespers: Contemporary American Poems of Religion and Spirituality. University of Iowa Press. ISBN 978-0-87745-855-5.
- Virgil Suárez; Ryan G. Van Cleave, eds. (2004). Red, White, and Blues: Poets on the Promise of America. University of Iowa Press. ISBN 978-0-87745-917-0.
