= Havilah Babcock House =

Historic house in Wisconsin, United States

- U.S. National Register of Historic Places
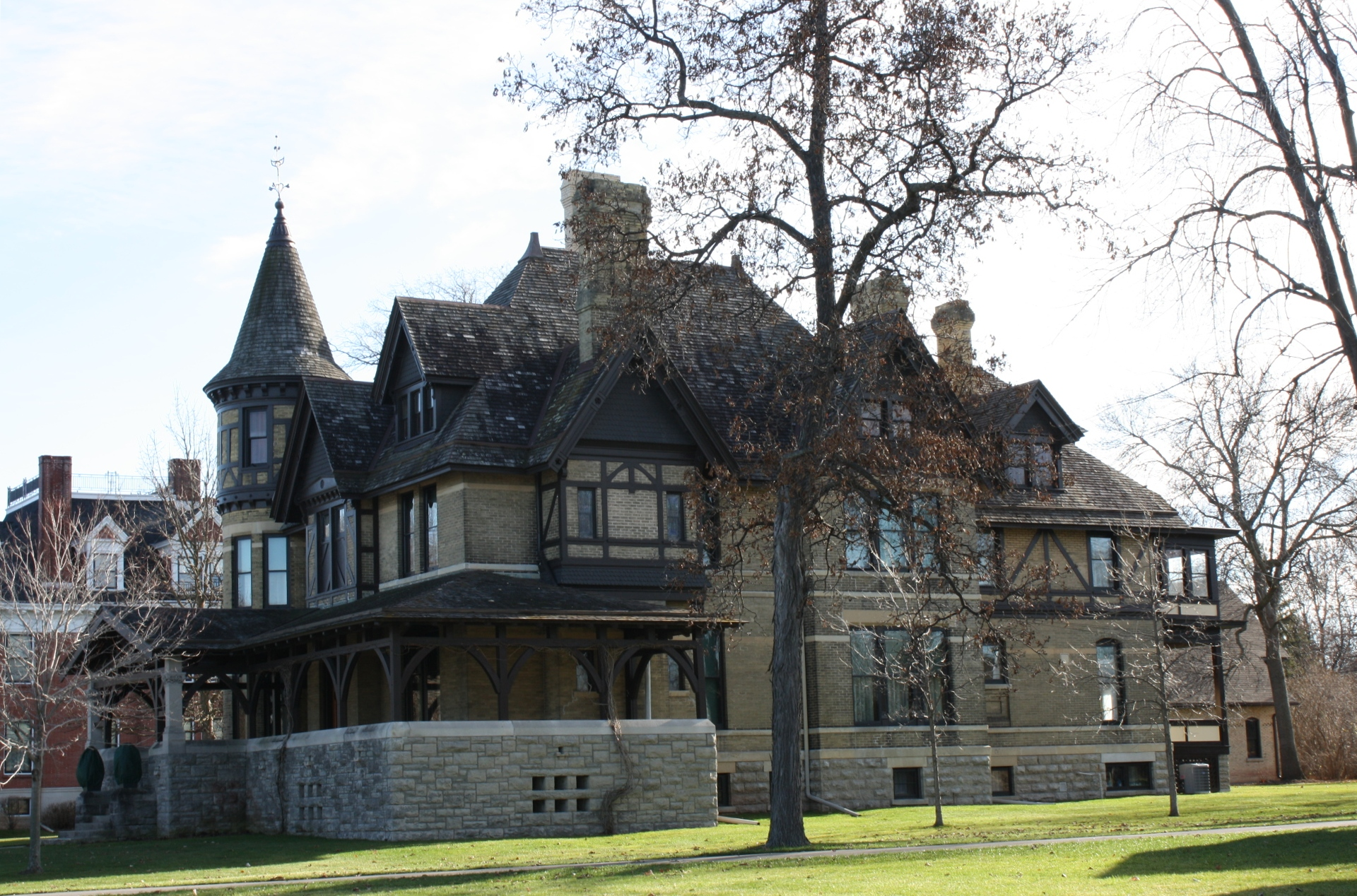
- Havilah Babcock House
- Location: 537 E. Wisconsin Ave., Neenah, Wisconsin
- Coordinates: 44°10′51″N 88°26′59″W
- Area: 2 acres (0.81 ha)
- Built: 1883
- Architect: William Waters
- Architectural style: Stick-Eastlake, Queen Anne, Romanesque Revival
- NRHP reference No.: 74000141
- Added to NRHP: August 7, 1974

The Havilah Babcock House is located in Neenah, Wisconsin, United States.

== History ==
The house, designed by William Waters, was built for Havilah Babcock, a co-founder of Kimberly-Clark. It was listed on the National Register of Historic Places in 1974 and on the State Register of Historic Places in 1989.
