= Henry Spencer Smith House =

Historic house in Wisconsin, United States

- U.S. National Register of Historic Places
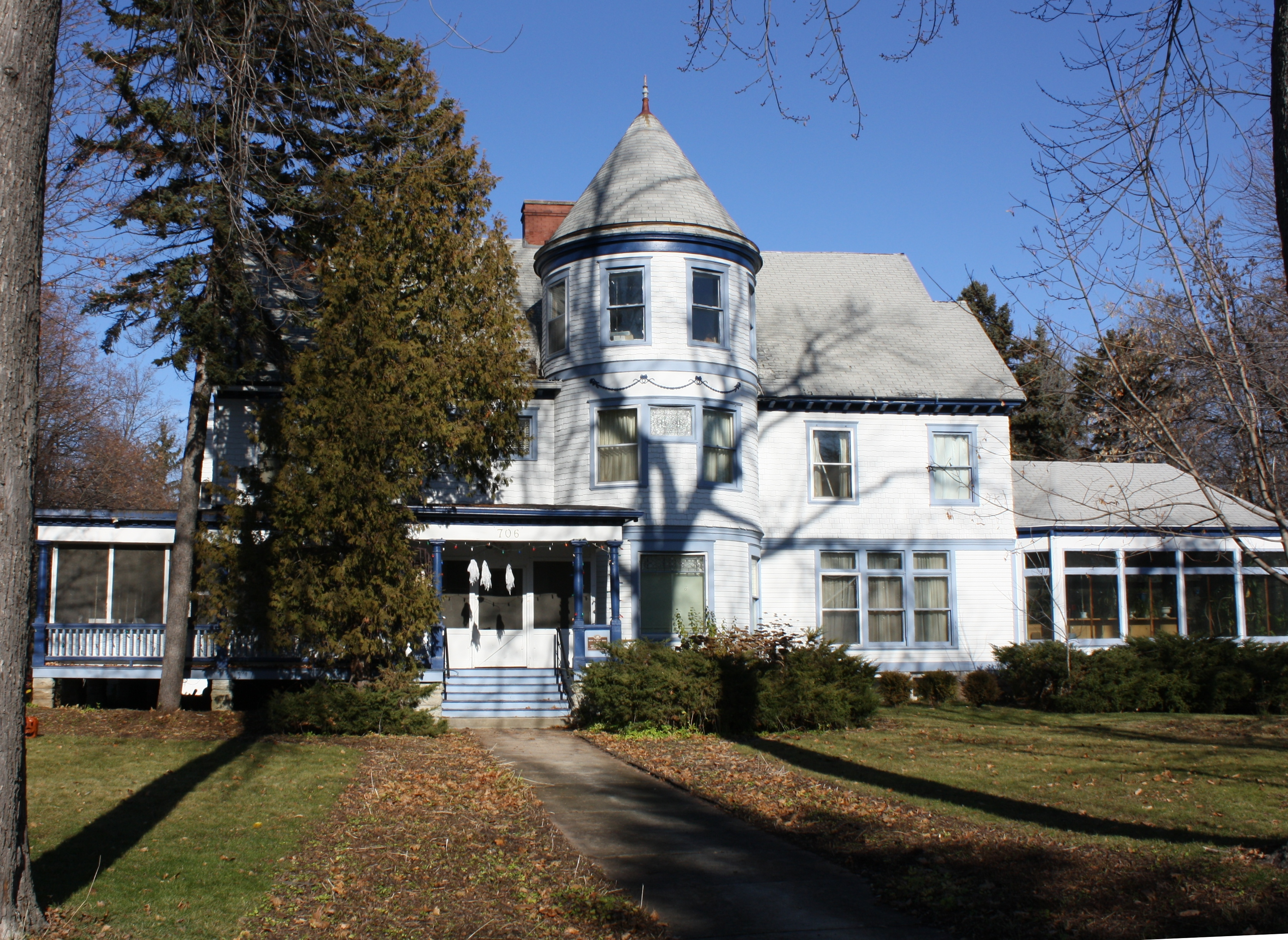
- Henry Spencer Smith House
- Location: 706 E. Forest Ave., Neenah, Wisconsin
- Coordinates: 44°11′27″N 88°26′47″W
- Area: 1 acre (0.40 ha)
- Architect: William Waters
- Architectural style: Colonial Revival, Shingle Style, Late Queen Anne
- NRHP reference No.: 82000735
- Added to NRHP: June 25, 1982

The Henry Spencer Smith House is located in Neenah, Wisconsin.

== History ==
Henry Spencer Smith was a son of pioneer and industrialist Elisha D. Smith. Located within the East Forest Avenue Historic District, the house was added to the National Register of Historic Places in 1982 and to the State Register of Historic Places in 1989. Currently, it serves as a hotel.

The nearby home of Smith's brother, known as the Charles R. Smith House, is also on both registers.
