= East Forest Avenue Historic District =

Historic district in Wisconsin, United States

- U.S. National Register of Historic Places
- U.S. Historic district
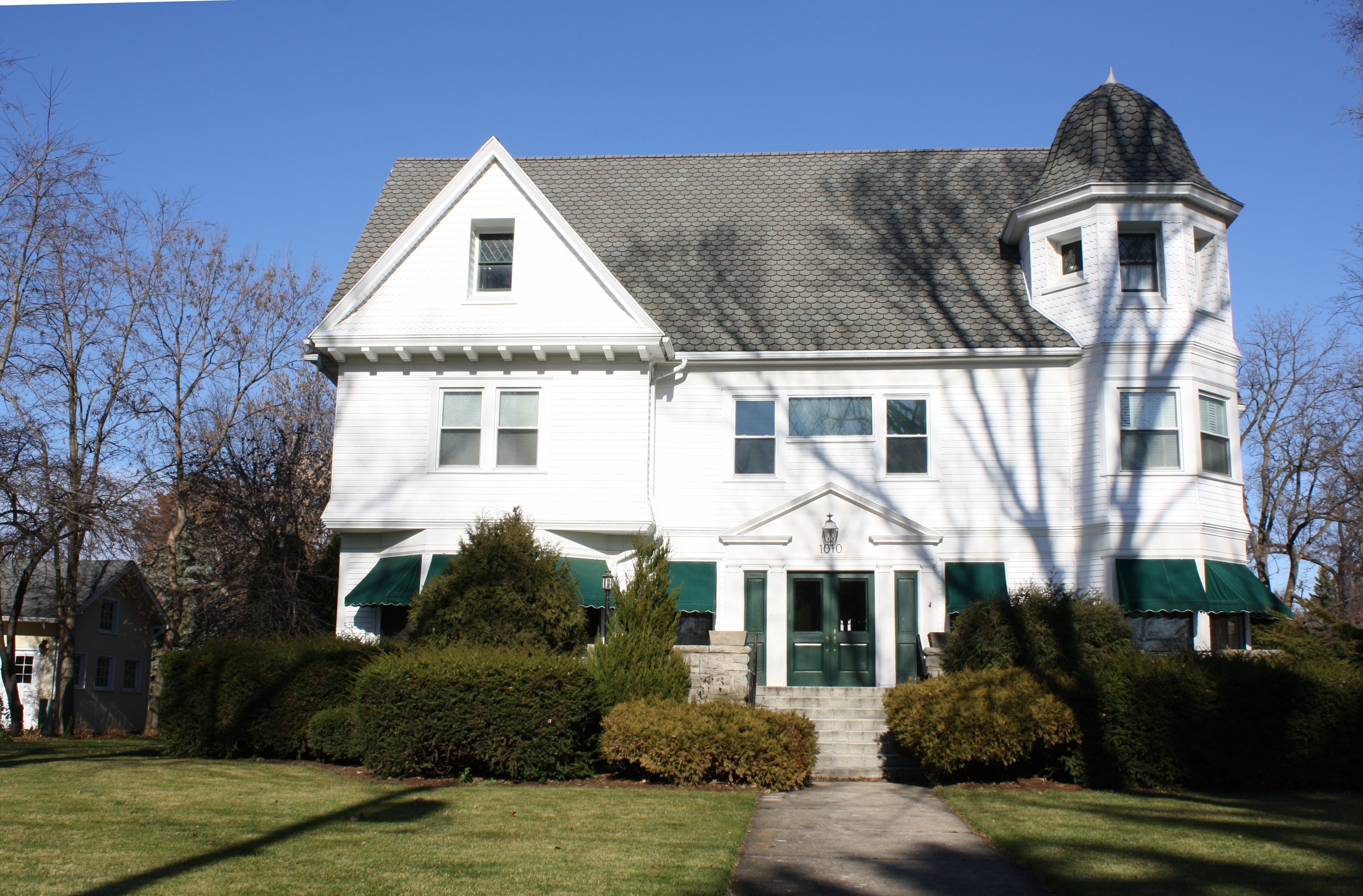
- A house located within the district.
- Location: Generally bounded by E. Forest Ave., Webster St., Hewitt St. and Eleventh St., Neenah, Wisconsin
- Coordinates: 44.19067°N 88.44599°W
- Area: 15.7 acres (6.4 ha)
- NRHP reference No.: 05001229
- Added to NRHP: November 9, 2005

The East Forest Avenue Historic District is located in Neenah, Wisconsin, USA. It was added to the State and the National Register of Historic Places in 2005. The Charles R. Smith House and the Henry Spencer Smith House are located in the district.
