= Mary Kimberly Shirk =

American philanthropist

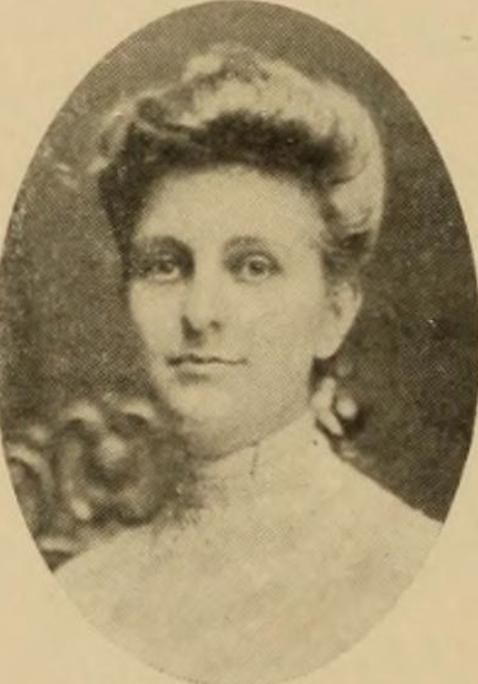
- Mary Emma Kimberly (later Shirk), from the 1904 yearbook of Smith College
- Born: Mary Emma Kimberly; April 2, 1880; Neenah, Wisconsin, U.S.
- Died: October 15, 1979 (aged 99); Redlands, California, U.S.
- Occupations: Philanthropist, clubwoman
- Parent: John A. Kimberly

Mary Emma Kimberly Shirk (April 2, 1880 – October 15, 1979) was an American philanthropist and clubwoman, based in Redlands, California. Her home, Kimberly Crest, is a historic house open for tours. She was interim president of Scripps College during World War II.

== Early life and education ==
Kimberly was born in Neenah, Wisconsin, the youngest of the seven children of John Alfred Kimberly and Helen Cheney Kimberly. Her father was president of Kimberly-Clark, a paper goods manufacturer. She graduated from Smith College in 1904.

== Career ==
Shirk moved back to Redlands, California, to live with her parents, after her husband died in 1919. She was president of the Contemporary Club from 1926 to 1928 and sponsored the Kimberly Juniors, a club for teens that her mother founded. She was a trustee of Scripps College and acting president of the college from 1942 to 1944, during World War II.

Shirk served on the board of directors of the Redlands Community Hospital. She was active in the YWCA, the American Association of University Women (AAUW), the Assistance League and the Lincoln Shrine Association. She and her sister were among the founders of the Paine Art Center and Gardens in Wisconsin. She hosted a community tree-lighting event at her Redlands home every December. She was on the board of the Webb School for Boys and a fellow of the University of Redlands.

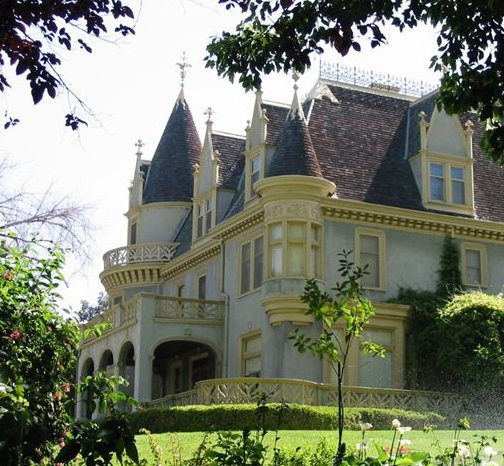
Kimberly Crest, Mary Kimberly Shirk's home in Redlands, CA.

Shirk enjoyed international travel. She made a world tour in 1932, and toured through Europe with Grace Morrison Poole in 1933. She visited Australia and New Zealand in 1936.

Shirk received several local awards, including the Elks Civic Award in 1959 and the Soroptimist Club's first "Woman of the Year" award. She received honorary doctorates from Smith College and the University of Redlands.

== Personal life and legacy ==
Kimberly married Elbert Walker Shirk in 1905; he was president of a cement company in Indiana. He was a naval aviator in World War I and died in 1919. Her older sister Jessie Kimberly Paine, with whom she lived in their later years, died in 1973 at age 100. Mary Kimberly Shirk died in 1979, at the age of 99, in Redlands. Her home, Kimberly Crest, is a now historic home in Redlands, open for rentals and tours. The household's full-time cook, Anne Canright, lived to be 102 and was one of the first docents at the historic site.
