= Edward D. & Vina Shattuck Beals House =

Historic house in Wisconsin, United States

- U.S. National Register of Historic Places
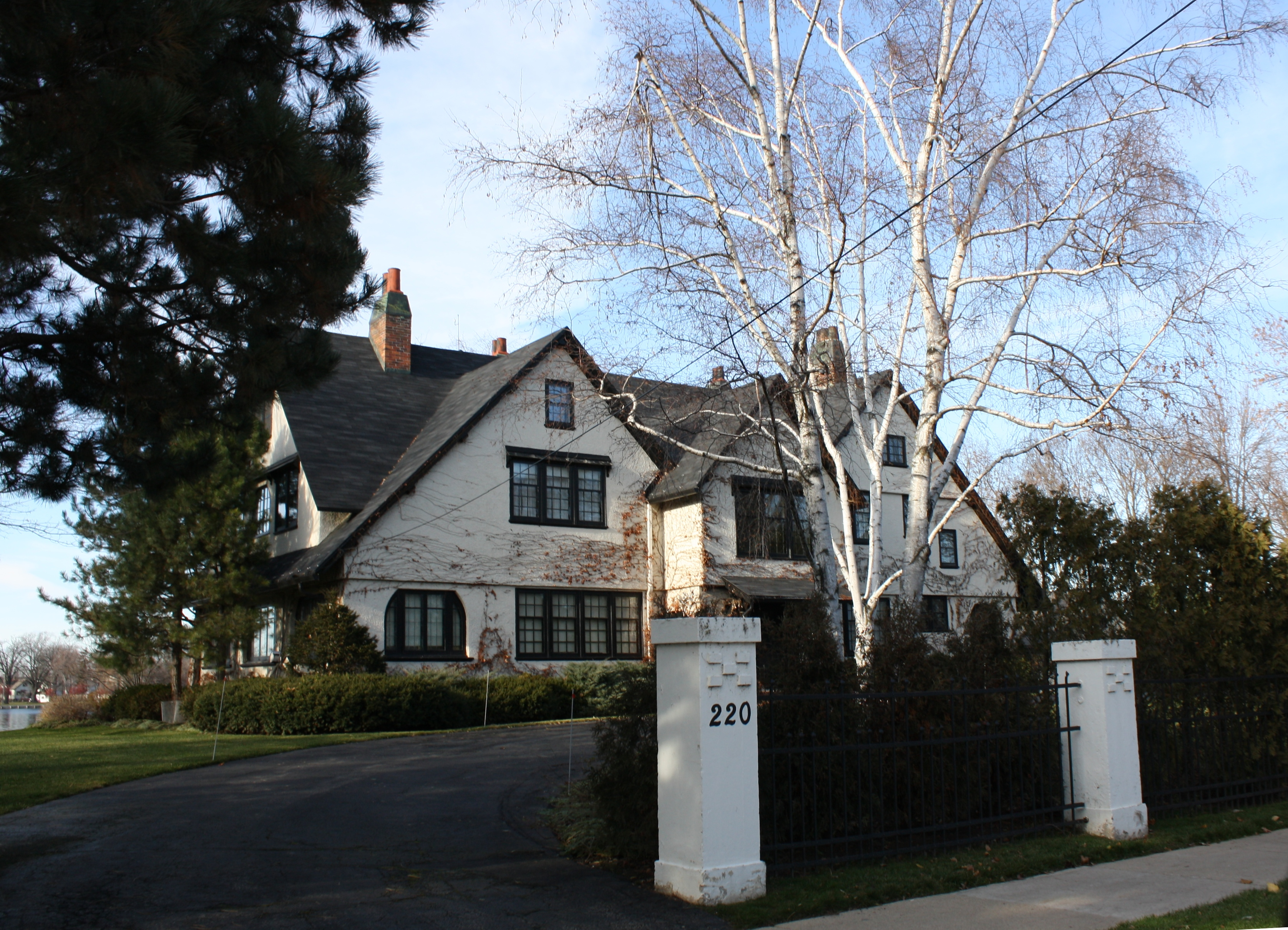
- Edward D. & Vina Shattuck Beals House

- Location within Wisconsin Location within the United States
- Location: 220 N. Park Ave., Neenah, Wisconsin
- Coordinates: 44°11′16″N 88°26′50″W
- Area: 1 acre (0.40 ha)
- Built: 1911
- Architect: Alexander C. Eschweiler
- Architectural style: Late 19th and Early 20th Century American Movements
- NRHP reference No.: 08000121
- Added to NRHP: February 27, 2008

The Edward D. & Vina Shattuck Beals House is located in Neenah, Wisconsin.

== History ==
Edward D. Beals was an industrialist. His wife, Vina Shattuck, was a Kimberly-Clark heiress. The house was added to the State Register of Historic Places in 2007 and to the National Register of Historic Places the following year.

The Franklyn C. Shattuck House, located in Neenah and having belonged to Vina's father, is also listed on the both registers.
