= Cobblestone Hotels =

American hotel chain

- Type: Private
- Industry: Hospitality
- Founded: 2008
- Founder: Brian Wogernese
- Headquarters: Neenah, Wisconsin, U.S.
- Number of locations: 165
- Area served: United States
- Key people: President and CEO Brian Wogernese
- Products: Hotels

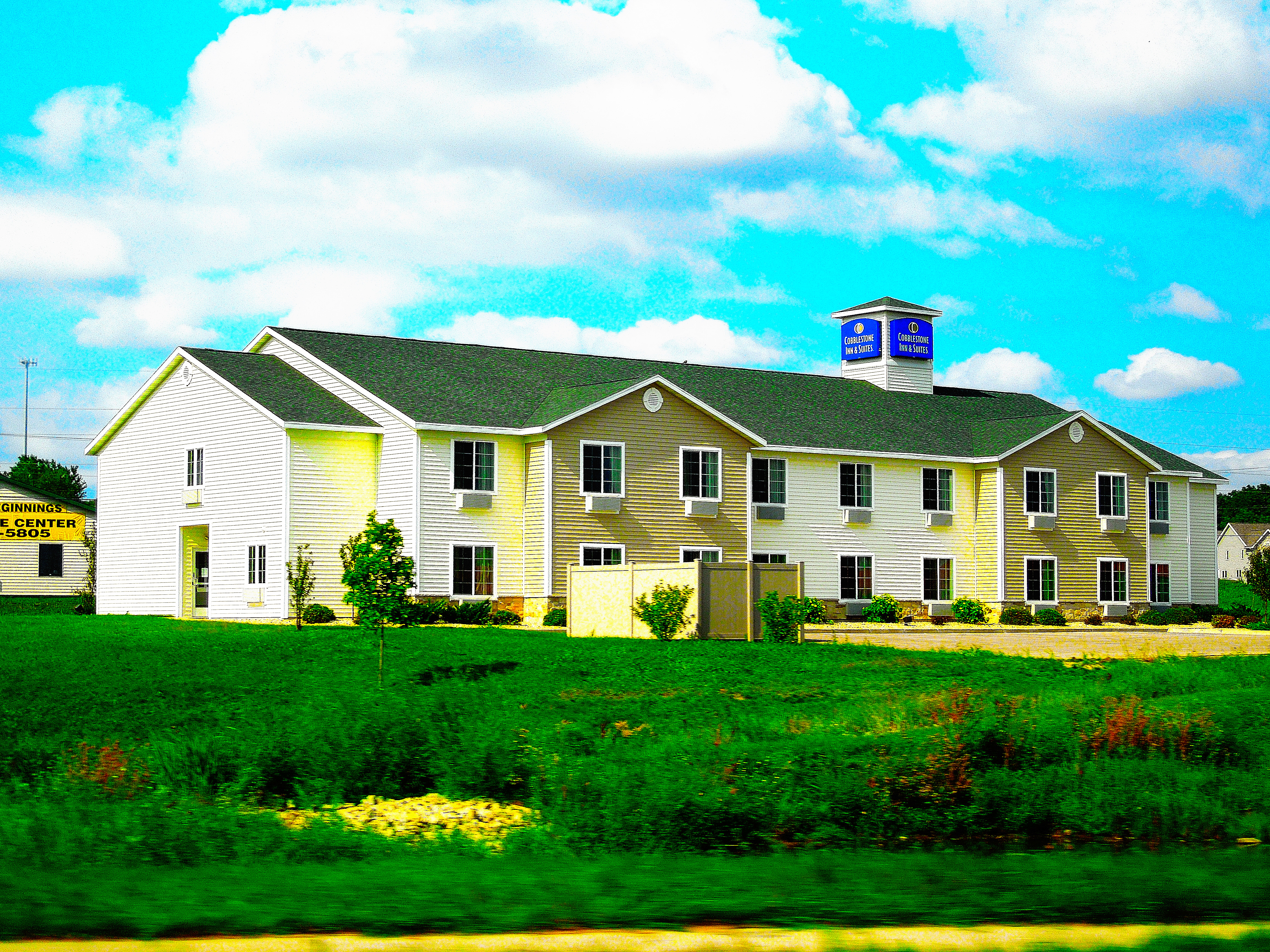
A Cobblestone Inn and Suites in Evansville, Wisconsin

Cobblestone Hotels is a chain of hotels in the United States. Their brands include Cobblestone Hotel & Suites, Cobblestone Inn & Suites, Boarders Inn & Suites, Centerstone Hotels, and KeyWest Hotels.

== History ==
Cobblestone was founded in 2008 with the opening of its first property in Clintonville, Wisconsin. Since its founding, the brand has expanded to over 165 locations open or under construction with 50 more in development, and spread across 27 states. Locations are meant to fill the lodging needs of smaller communities that might not otherwise be served by other hotel chains. Cobblestone acquired Key West Inns and Centerstone Hotels from Vimana Franchise in August 2018. In October 2018 Cobblestone also acquired Boulders Inn & Suites

== Brands ==
Cobblestone Hotel & Suites - Main Street and Cobblestone Inn & Suites - Main Street are upper-midscale hotels with premiere downtown location.

Cobblestone Hotel & Suites and Cobblestone Inn & Suites are upper-midscale hotels; the brand consists primarily of newly constructed properties.

Boarders Inn & Suites are mid-scale hotels that are brand conversions.

Centerstone Hotels are upper economy conversion hotels.

KeyWest Hotels are economy hotels that are both conversion and new build.

== Cobblestone Rewards ==
Cobblestone Rewards is the tiered membership program offered by Cobblestone Hotels. Perks offered by the program include complimentary room upgrades, additional amenities, and priority reservations.

Member Tiers & Benefits: Earn 10 point per 1 USD spent on room charges.

- Silver Member: Priority Check In, Online Reservations, Exclusive Member Offers
- Gold Members: 25% Bonus Points, Early Check In & Late Check Out, Online Reservations, Exclusive Member Offers
  - Qualifications: 10 Nights within a 12 Month Period
- Platinum Members: 50% Bonus Points; Early Check In & Late Check Out, Online Reservations, Exclusive Member Offers
  - Qualifications: 20 Nights within a 12 Month Period
