= Neenah, Wisconsin =

City in Wisconsin, USA, since 1835

- City
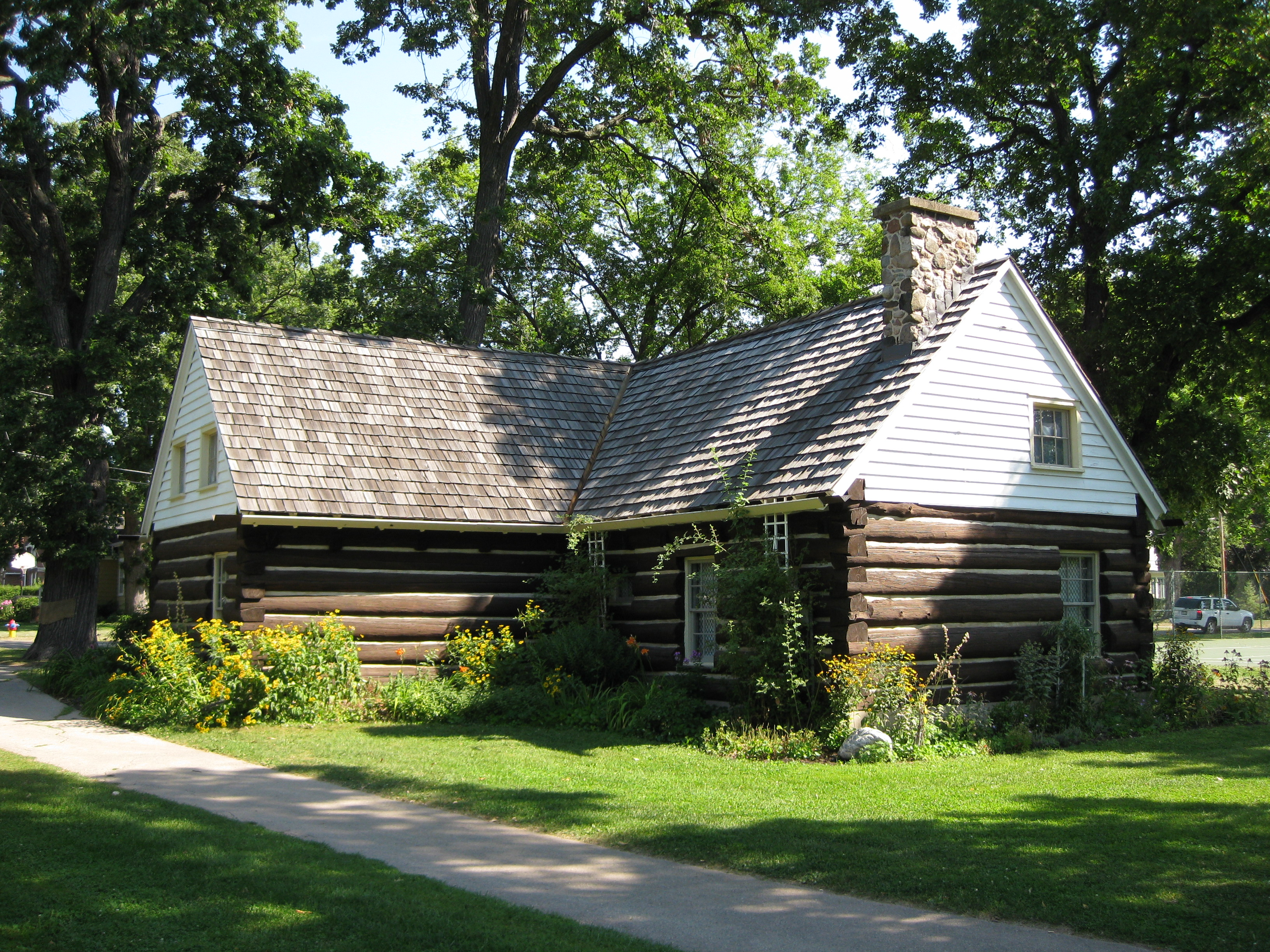
- James Duane Doty's cabin on Doty Island
- Nickname: The Paper City
- Motto: "Our future, our Neenah"
- Location of Neenah in Winnebago County, Wisconsin.

- Location within Wisconsin Location within the United States
- Coordinates: 44°10′27″N 88°28′7″W
- Country: United States
- State: Wisconsin
- County: Winnebago
- Mission: 1835
- Incorporated: 13 March 1873 (city)

Government
  - Type: Mayor-council
  - Mayor: Brian Borchardt

Area
  - Total: 9.75 sq mi (25.24 km^{2})
  - Land: 9.37 sq mi (24.27 km^{2})
  - Water: 0.37 sq mi (0.96 km^{2})
- Elevation: 750 ft (230 m)

Population (2020)
  - Total: 27,319
  - Density: 2,915/sq mi (1,125.6/km^{2})
- Time zone: UTC−6 (Central (CST))
  - Summer (DST): UTC−5 (CDT)
- ZIP codes: 54956
- Area code: 920
- FIPS code: 55-55750
- Website: www.ci.neenah.wi.us

Neenah (/ˈniːnə/ NEE-nə) is a city in Winnebago County, Wisconsin, United States. It is situated on the banks of Lake Winnebago, Little Lake Butte des Morts, and the Fox River approximately 10 miles (16 km) northeast of Oshkosh and 40 miles (64 km) southwest of Green Bay. Neenah's population was 27,319 at the 2020 census.

Neenah is within the geographic boundaries of the Town of Neenah, but is politically independent. The city is the southwesternmost of the Fox Cities of northeastern Wisconsin. It is a principal city of the Oshkosh–Neenah metropolitan statistical area, which consists of all of Winnebago County and had 171,730 residents in 2020. It is sometimes referred to as a twin city with Menasha, with which it shares Doty Island.

== History ==
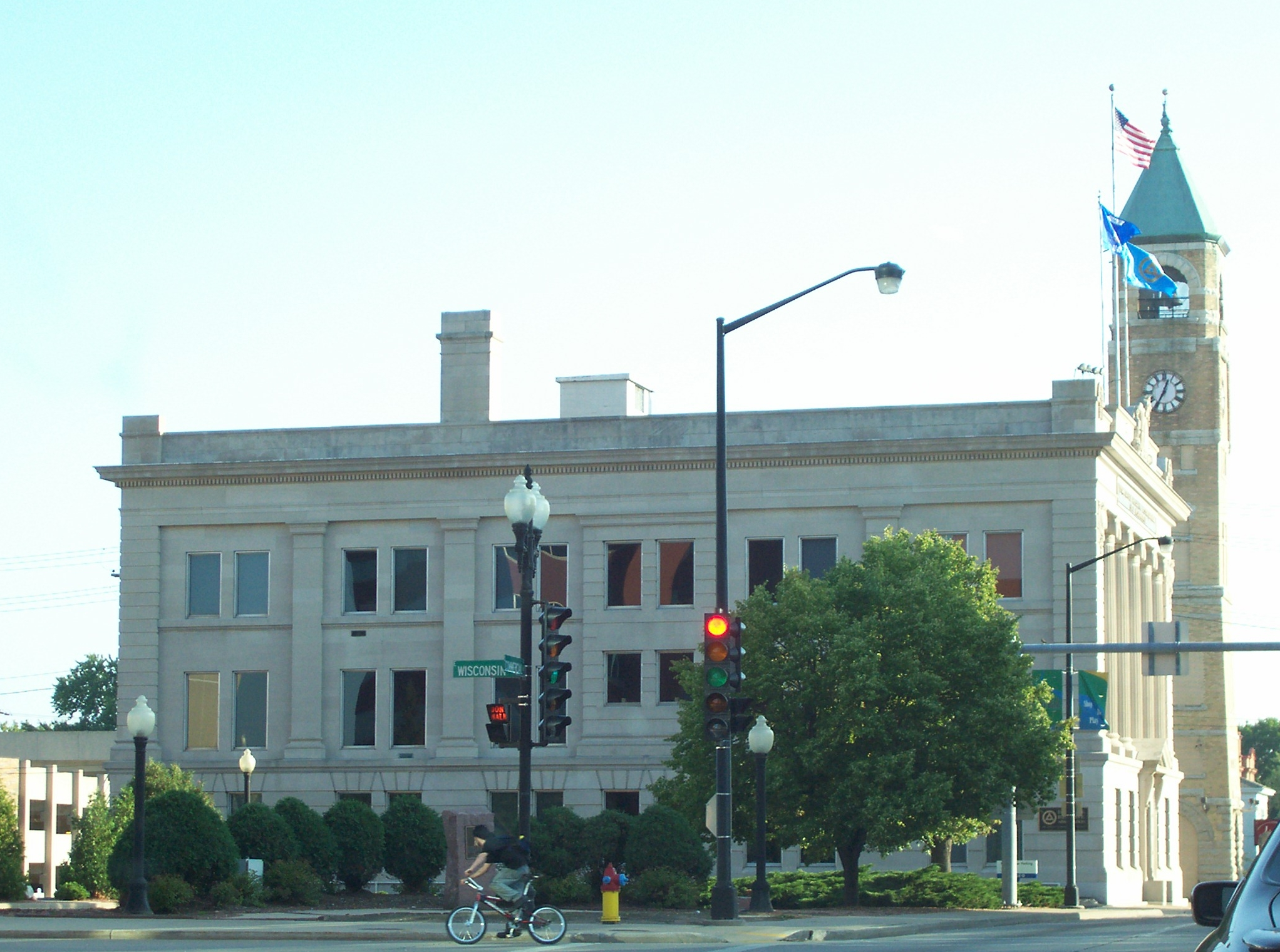
Neo-classical style Equitable Fraternal Union Building with the old City Hall clock tower behind it on S. Commercial St. (Wisconsin Highway 114).

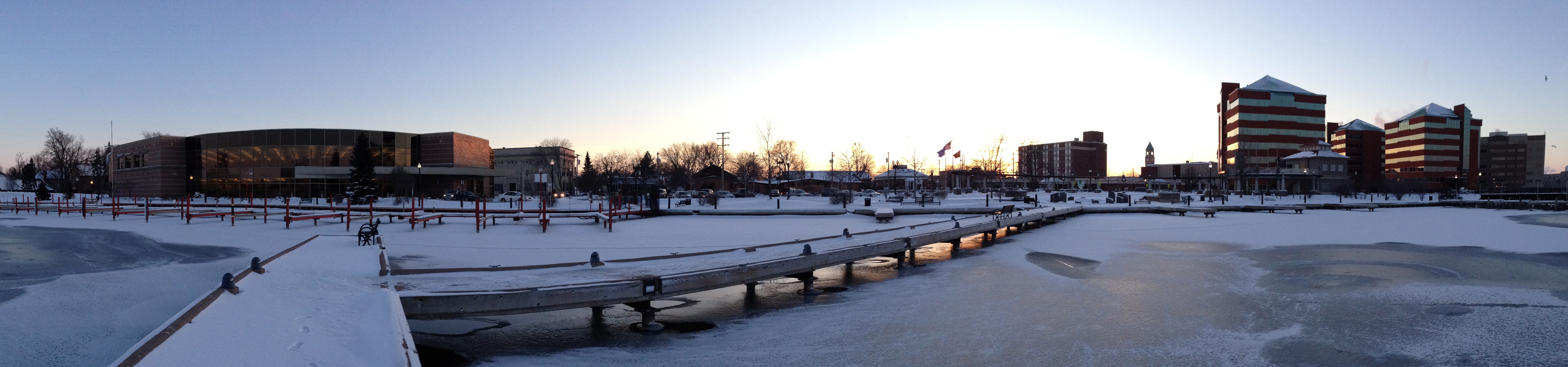
The Neenah Public Library, the clock tower, Shattuck Park, and the Neenah Centers.

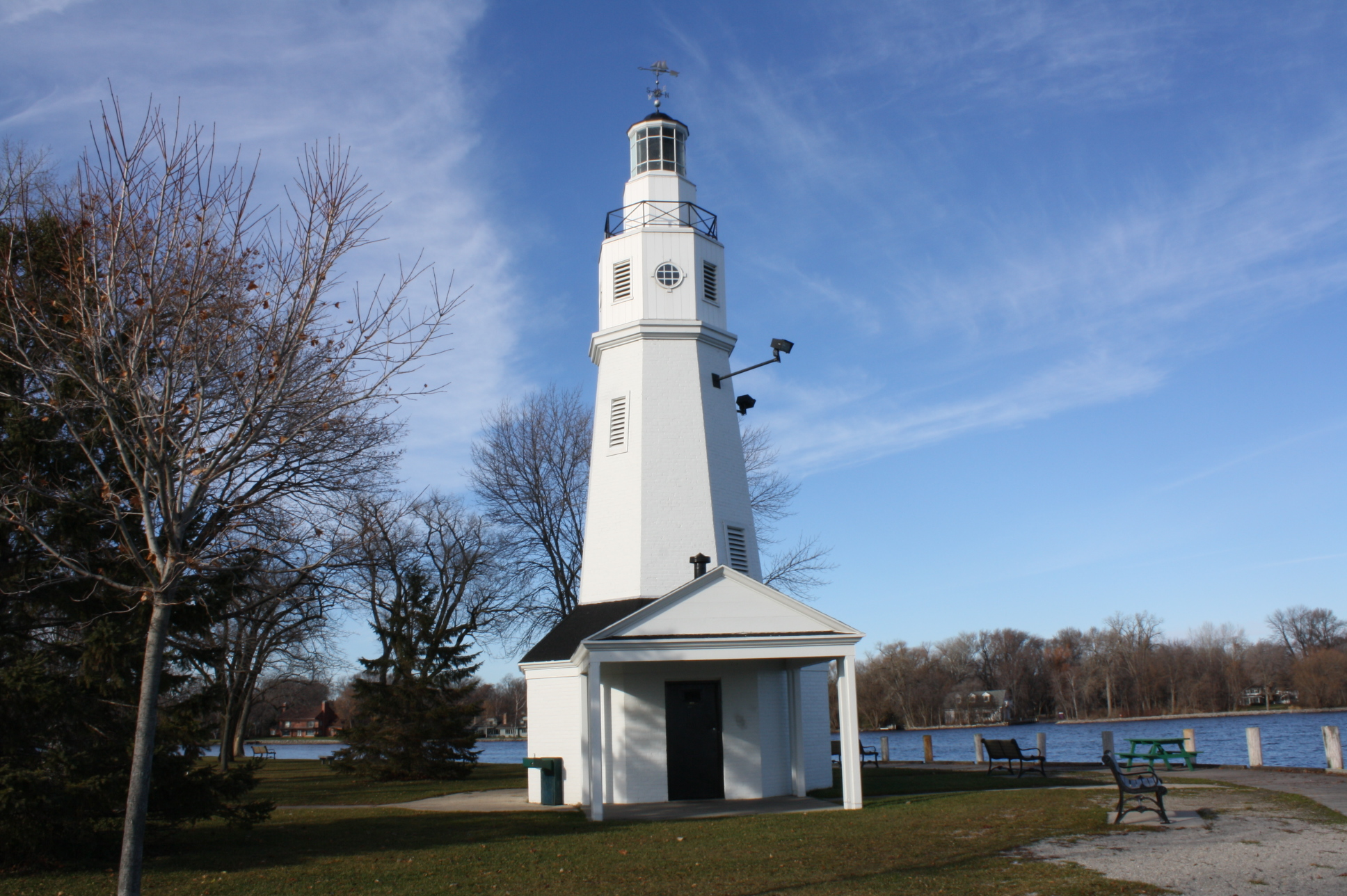
Neenah Light on the Fox River

Neenah was named by Governor James Duane Doty from the Hoocąk word for "water" or "running water". It was the site of a Ho-Chunk village from at least the late 18th century through 1830. In 1830, Juliette Magill Kinzie and other European Americans called the site "Four-Legs' village" for a Ho-Chunk chief who resided there. It is Nįįňą in the Hoocąk language.

The U.S. government initially designated this area in 1835 as an industrial and agricultural mission to the Menominee people of the area. Early settlement by European Americans began a few years later, stimulated in large part by the proximity of the area to the Fox River.

Kimberly-Clark corporation was formed here in 1872. It founded a major paper mill here in 1873, as the region had become a center of lumbering. Profits from lumber stimulated the development of businesses and a variety of professions. Some people relocated to Neenah after the disastrous fire in Oshkosh in 1875.

== Geography ==
Neenah is located at 44°10′26″N 88°28′6″W (44.174035, −88.468508).

According to the United States Census Bureau, the city has a total area of 9.74 square miles (25.23 km^{2}), of which 9.37 square miles (24.27 km^{2}) is land and 0.37 square miles (0.96 km^{2}) is water.

== Demographics ==
Historical population
| Census | Pop. | Note | %± |
|---|---|---|---|
| 1860 | 1,296 | | — |
| 1870 | 2,655 | | 104.9% |
| 1880 | 4,202 | | 58.3% |
| 1890 | 5,083 | | 21.0% |
| 1900 | 5,954 | | 17.1% |
| 1910 | 5,734 | | −3.7% |
| 1920 | 7,171 | | 25.1% |
| 1930 | 9,151 | | 27.6% |
| 1940 | 10,645 | | 16.3% |
| 1950 | 12,437 | | 16.8% |
| 1960 | 18,057 | | 45.2% |
| 1970 | 22,902 | | 26.8% |
| 1980 | 22,432 | | −2.1% |
| 1990 | 23,219 | | 3.5% |
| 2000 | 24,507 | | 5.5% |
| 2010 | 25,501 | | 4.1% |
| 2020 | 27,319 | | 7.1% |
U.S. Decennial Census

=== 2020 census ===
As of the 2020 census, Neenah had a population of 27,319. The population density was 2,915 inhabitants per square mile (1,125/km^{2}). There were 12,164 housing units at an average density of 1,298 per square mile (501/km^{2}). The median age was 38.6 years. 24.1% of residents were under the age of 18 and 16.4% of residents were 65 years of age or older. For every 100 females there were 96.8 males, and for every 100 females age 18 and over there were 93.7 males age 18 and over.

99.9% of residents lived in urban areas, while 0.1% lived in rural areas.

There were 11,686 households in Neenah, of which 29.5% had children under the age of 18 living in them. Of all households, 45.1% were married-couple households, 19.5% were households with a male householder and no spouse or partner present, and 26.9% were households with a female householder and no spouse or partner present. About 32.6% of all households were made up of individuals and 13.6% had someone living alone who was 65 years of age or older.

Of all housing units, 3.9% were vacant. The homeowner vacancy rate was 0.7% and the rental vacancy rate was 3.9%.

Racial composition as of the 2020 census
| Race | Number | Percent |
|---|---|---|
| White | 24,029 | 88.0% |
| Black or African American | 484 | 1.8% |
| American Indian and Alaska Native | 180 | 0.7% |
| Asian | 623 | 2.3% |
| Native Hawaiian and Other Pacific Islander | 15 | 0.1% |
| Some other race | 408 | 1.5% |
| Two or more races | 1,580 | 5.8% |
| Hispanic or Latino (of any race) | 1,311 | 4.8% |

=== 2016-2020 ACS estimates ===
According to the American Community Survey estimates for 2016-2020, the median income for a household in the city was $59,778, and the median income for a family was $77,229. Male full-time workers had a median income of $52,352 versus $40,085 for female workers. The per capita income for the city was $33,420. About 8.6% of families and 11.8% of the population were below the poverty line, including 18.7% of those under age 18 and 9.3% of those age 65 or over. Of the population age 25 and over, 94.9% were high school graduates or higher and 32.1% had a bachelor's degree or higher.

=== 2010 census ===
As of the census of 2010, there were 25,501 people, 10,694 households, and 6,700 families living in the city. The population density was 2,762.8 inhabitants per square mile (1,066.7/km^{2}). There were 11,313 housing units at an average density of 1,225.7 units per square mile (473.2 units/km^{2}). The racial makeup of the city was 93.7% White, 1.3% African American, 0.7% Native American, 1.4% Asian, 1.3% from other races, and 1.5% from two or more races. Hispanic or Latino of any race were 3.8% of the population.

There were 10,694 households, of which 32.2% had children under the age of 18 living with them, 47.6% were married couples living together, 10.5% had a female householder with no husband present, 4.6% had a male householder with no wife present, and 37.3% were non-families. 30.7% of all households were made up of individuals, and 10.7% had someone living alone who was 65 years of age or older. The average household size was 2.36 and the average family size was 2.96.

The median age in the city was 37.1 years. 25% of residents were under the age of 18; 7.8% were between the ages of 18 and 24; 27.6% were from 25 to 44; 27% were from 45 to 64; and 12.7% were 65 years of age or older. The gender makeup of the city was 48.9% male and 51.1% female.

=== 2000 census ===
As of the census of 2000, there were 24,507 people, 9,834 households and 6,578 families living in the city. The population density was 2,971.7 people per square mile (1,147.4 people/km^{2}). There were 10,198 housing units at an average density of 1,236.6 units per square mile (477.5 units/km^{2}). The racial makeup of the city was 96.08% White, 0.34% Black or African American, 0.55% Native American, 0.96% Asian, 0.86% from other races, and 1.20% from two or more races. 2.02% of the population were Hispanic or Latino of any race.

Thirty-five percent of the households had children under the age of 18 living with them, 53.8% were married couples living together, 9.8% had a female householder with no husband present, and 33.1% were non-families. 27.5% of all households were made up of individuals, and 10.1% had someone living alone who was 65 years of age or older. The average household size was 2.47 and the average family size was 3.03.

In the city, the population was spread out, with 27.5% under the age of 18, 7.6% from 18 to 24, 32.0% from 25 to 44, 20.3% from 45 to 64, and 12.5% who were 65 years of age or older. The median age was 35 years. For every 100 females, there were 94.6 males. For every 100 females age 18 and over, there were 91.8 males.

The median income for a household in the city was $45,773, and the median income for a family was $55,329. Males had a median income of $39,140 versus $25,666 for females. The per capita income for the city was $24,280. About 3.3% of families and 5.4% of the population were below the poverty line, including 6.4% of those under age 18 and 7.2% of those age 65 or over.

== In popular culture ==
There is a song about Neenah called “Neenah, Wisconsin” by Enunci8 and one called “Neenah Menasha” by Sponge. The latter is on Spotify.

== Economy ==
Neenah hosts significant paper and steel industries. Some paper companies include Essity and Kimberly-Clark. Kimberly-Clark was founded in Neenah and maintains significant operations there, though its headquarters moved to Irving, Texas in the 1980s. Manhole covers manufactured at Neenah Foundry can be found throughout the central and southern United States and parts of Europe.

Neenah is the headquarters of Plexus, a developer and manufacturer of electronic products, which also has engineering and manufacturing operations in the city. Also headquartered here are Cobblestone Hotel Group, J. J. Keller & Associates, Miron Construction, Menasha Corporation. Theda Clark Hospital, NM Transfer, and Checker Logistics.

== Arts and culture ==
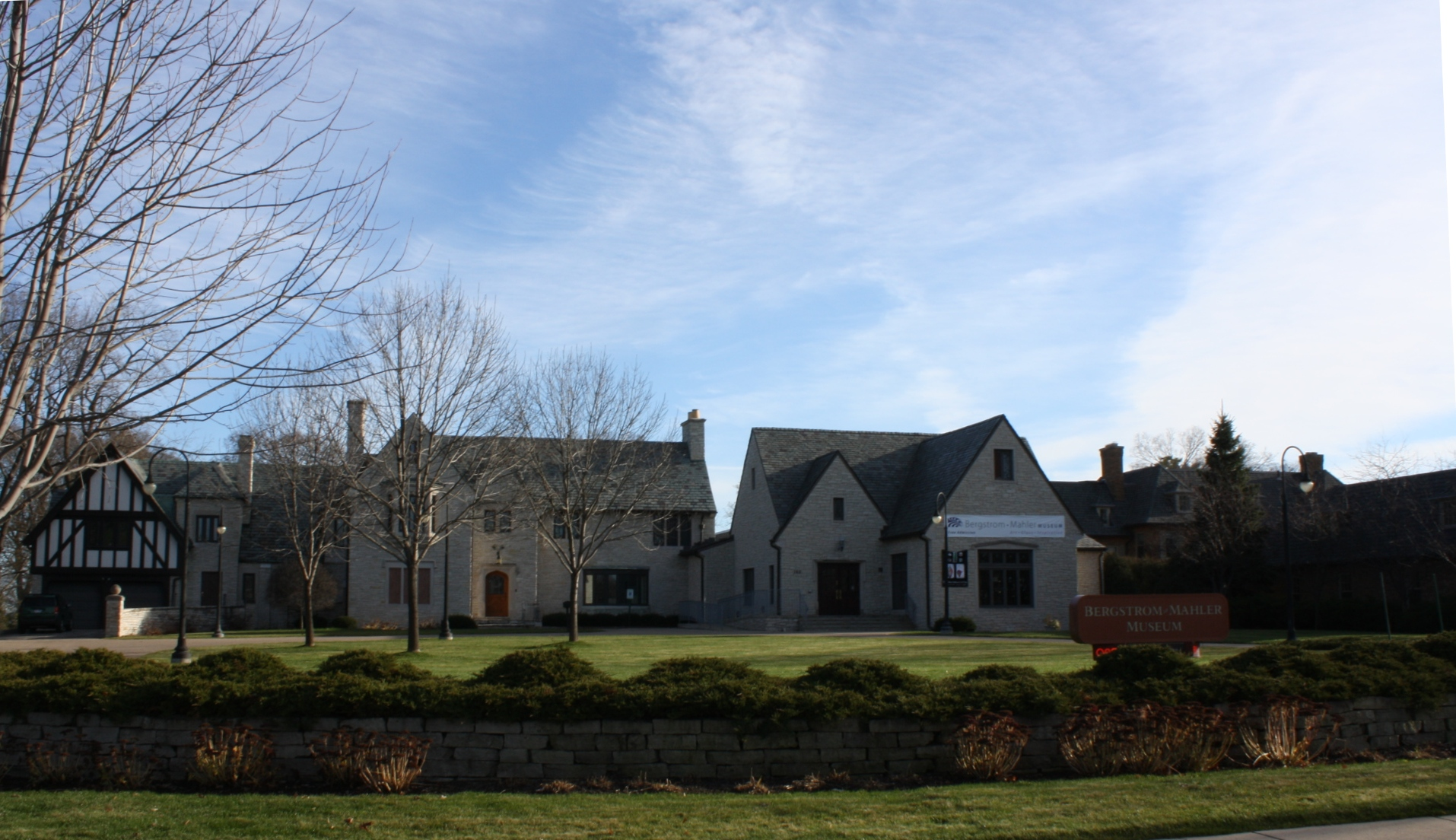
Bergstrom-Mahler Museum

Founded in 1959, Neenah's Bergstrom-Mahler Museum has a collection of glass art comprising over 5,000 pieces. It concentrates in glass paperweights, Germanic drinking vessels, and contemporary studio glass sculpture.

== Transportation ==
Interstate 41 runs south to north through the west side of the city. Bus service is operated by Valley Transit.

Appleton International Airport provides commercial airline service for the city. Brennand Airport supports general aviation service.

Earlier served by the Chicago & Northwestern, the Soo Line and the Milwaukee Road, Neenah today is on the Canadian National Railway's line from Chicago to International Falls.

== Notable people ==
- Jack Ankerson, NFL player
- William Arnemann, politician
- Havilah Babcock, businessman and a founder of Kimberly Clark
- James R. Barnett, politician
- George Bergstrom, designer of The Pentagon
- Robert D. Bohn, U.S. Marine Corps Major General
- John A. Bryan, U.S. diplomat
- Elmer J. Burr, Medal of Honor recipient
- Merritt L. Campbell, politician
- Charles B. Clark, U.S. Representative and a founder of Kimberly-Clark
- Laura Coenen, basketball all-American, 3-time Olympian – team handball
- Kenneth John Conant, architectural historian, professor at Harvard University
- Samuel A. Cook, U.S. Representative
- Philip Daly, municipal councillor in Edmonton, Alberta
- George Danielson, politician
- Craig Culver, co-founder of the Culver's restaurant chain
- Julius H. Dennhardt, politician
- William Draheim, politician
- A. D. Eldridge, politician
- Michael Ellis, politician
- James C. Fritzen, politician
- Robert Frederick Froehlke, businessman and government official
- Charles A. Gombert, architect
- Jim Hall, professional boxer
- Marcus Lee Hansen, historian and Pulitzer Prize winner, born in Neenah
- William C. Hansen, educator and politician
- Howard Hawks, film director, Rio Bravo, Red River, The Big Sleep
- William Hawks, film producer
- Christopher T. Hill, author and theoretical physicist
- Zuhdi Jasser, medical doctor, activist, policy board member
- Dick Jorgensen, NFL referee, Super Bowl XXIV
- Frank Bateman Keefe, U.S. Representative
- Kris Kelderman, MLS player and assistant coach
- John A. Kimberly, a founder of Kimberly-Clark
- Judith Klusman, politician
- Peter Konz, NFL Player
- Wayne Kreklow, NBA player, head coach of the Missouri Tigers women's volleyball team
- Nels Larson, politician and businessman
- Henry Leavens, politician
- Rich Loiselle, MLB player
- Ernst Mahler, chemist and business leader
- David Martin, politician
- Azel W. Patten, businessman and politician
- Charles H. Pfennig, politician
- Roger Ream, educator
- Reid Ribble, politician
- Nathaniel S. Robinson, physician and politician
- Mike Rohrkaste, politician and businessman
- Gerard John Schaefer, serial killer, was born in Neenah
- John Schneller, NFL player
- Mary Kimberly Shirk, philanthropist born in Neenah
- Richard J. Steffens, politician
- John Stevens, inventor of the roller flour mill
- John Strange, lieutenant governor of Wisconsin
- Kenneth E. Stumpf, Medal of Honor recipient
- Konrad Tuchscherer, professor
- Ryan G. Van Cleave, author and educator
- Edwin Wheeler, politician and jurist
- John Whitlinger, tennis player, born in Neenah
- Tami Whitlinger, WTA player
- Edwin A. Williams, legislator, educator, businessman, mayor
- John Wroblewski, hockey coach

== Images ==
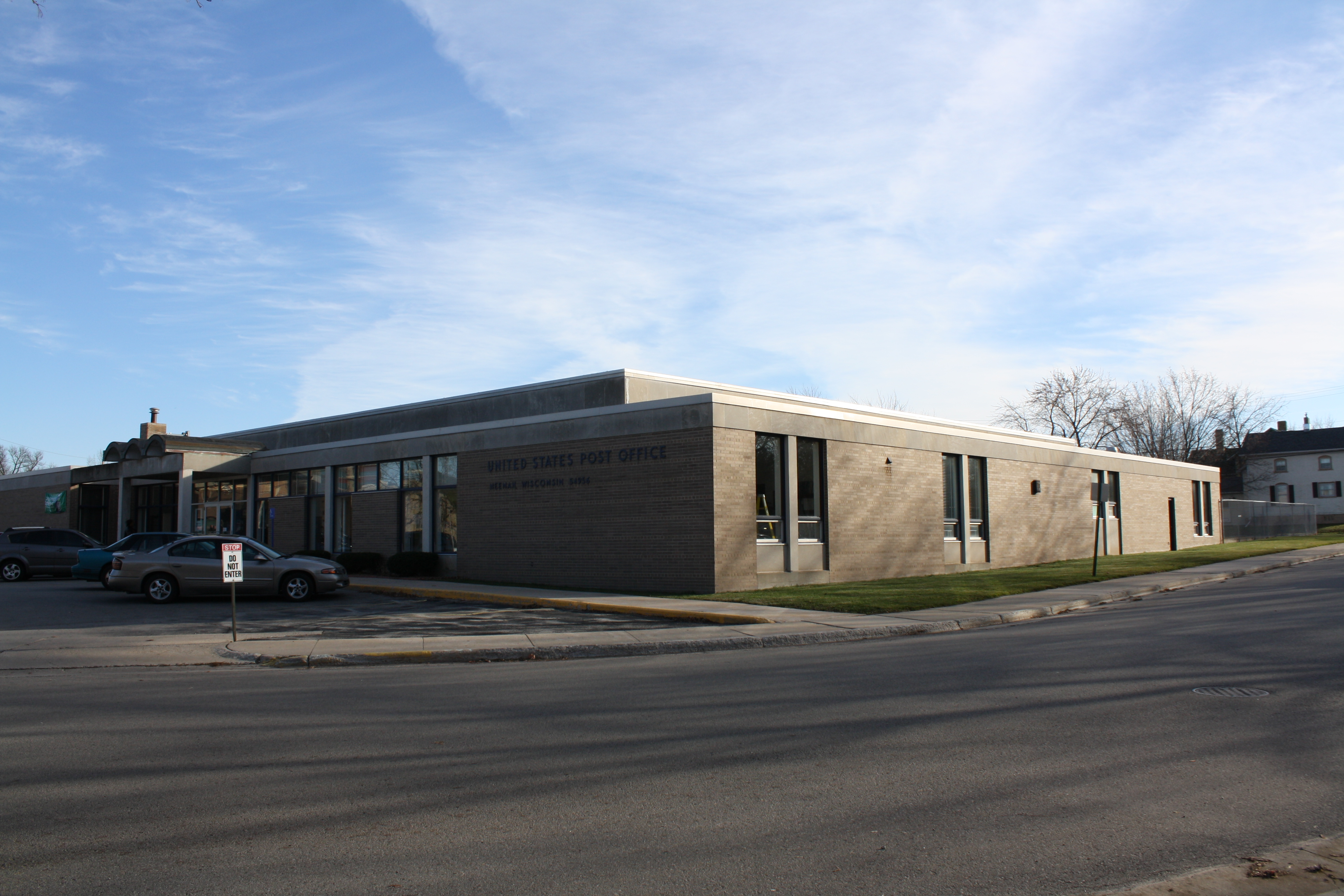
Neenah Post Office

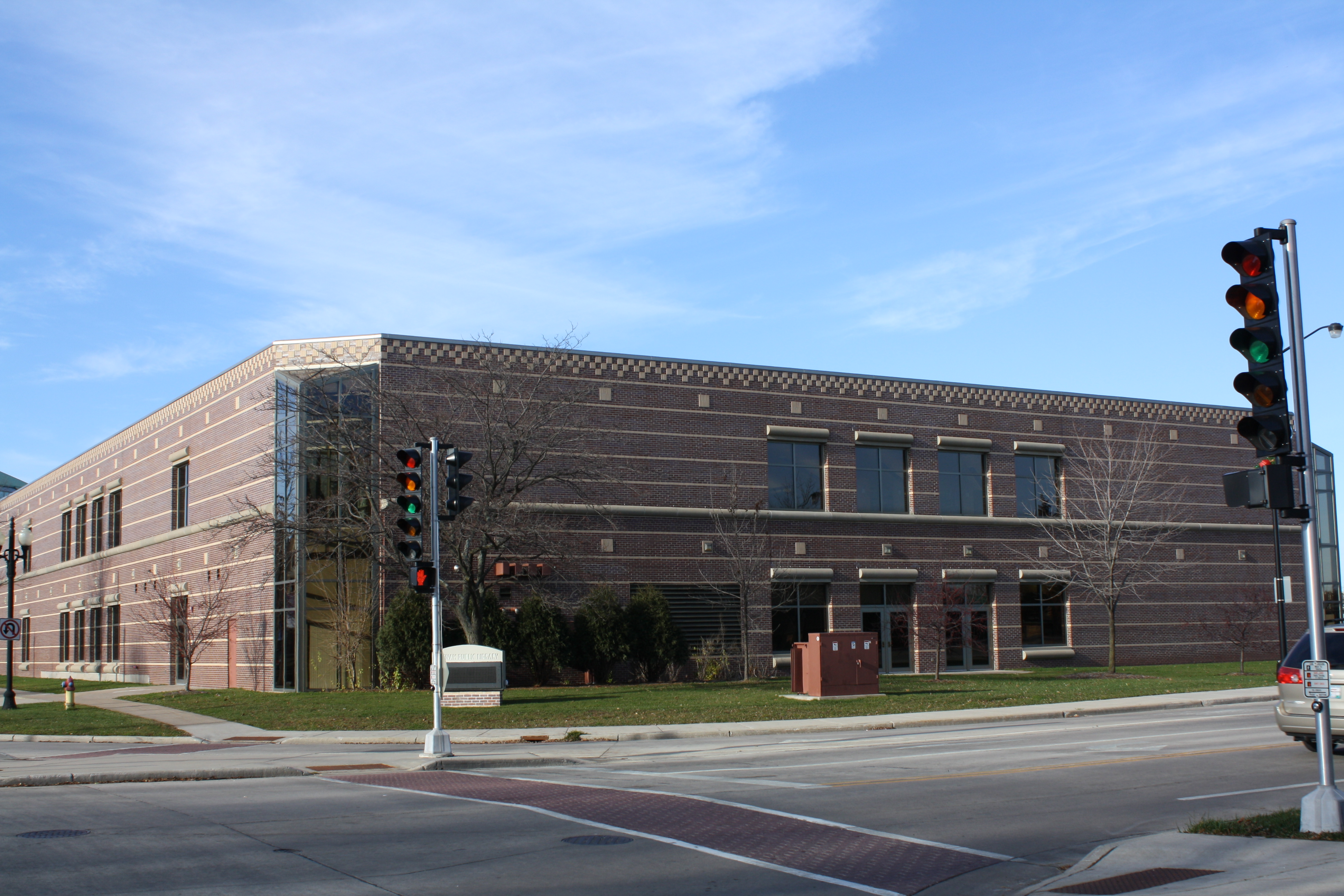
Library

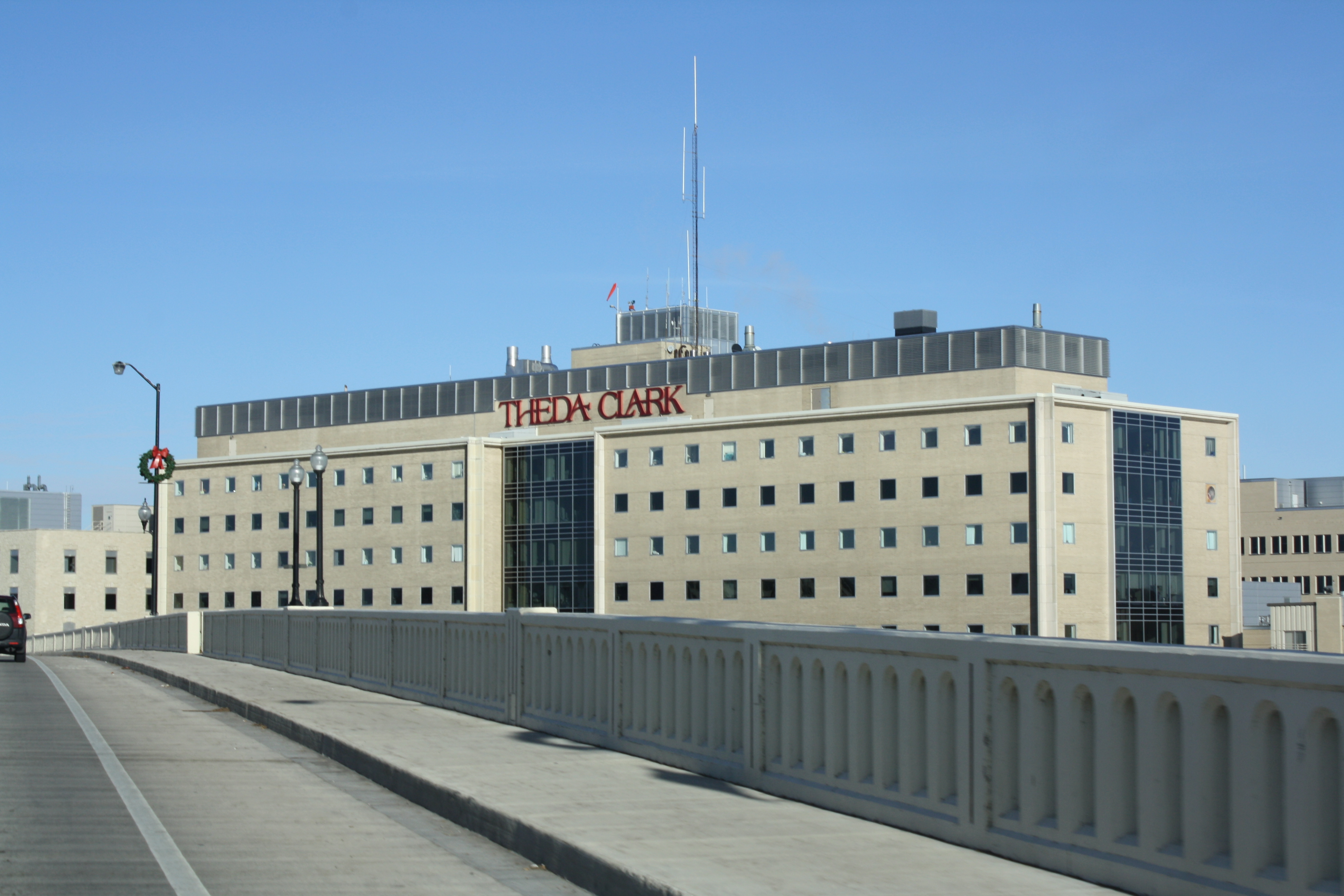
Theda Clark Medical Center

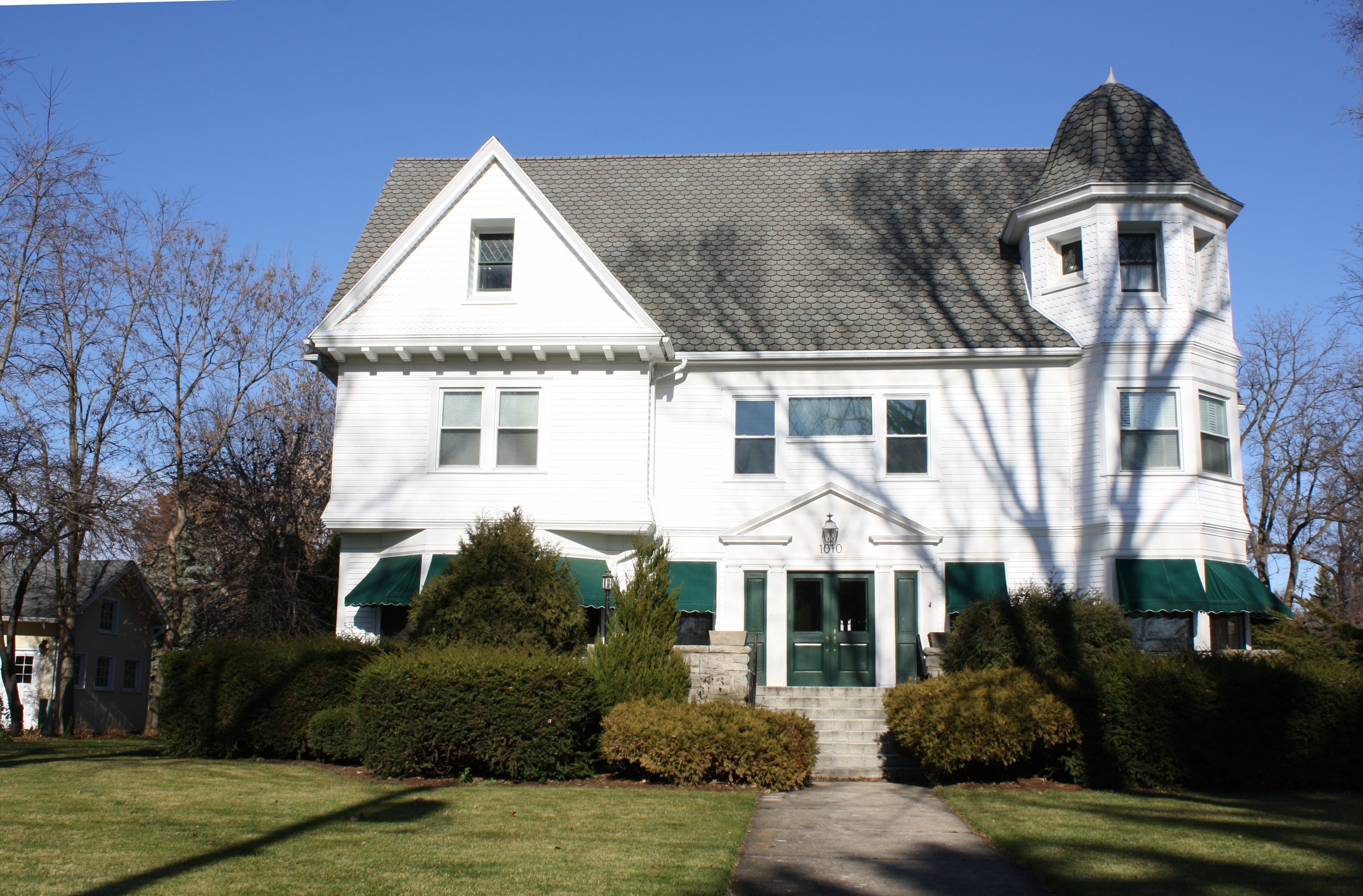
East Forest Avenue Historic District

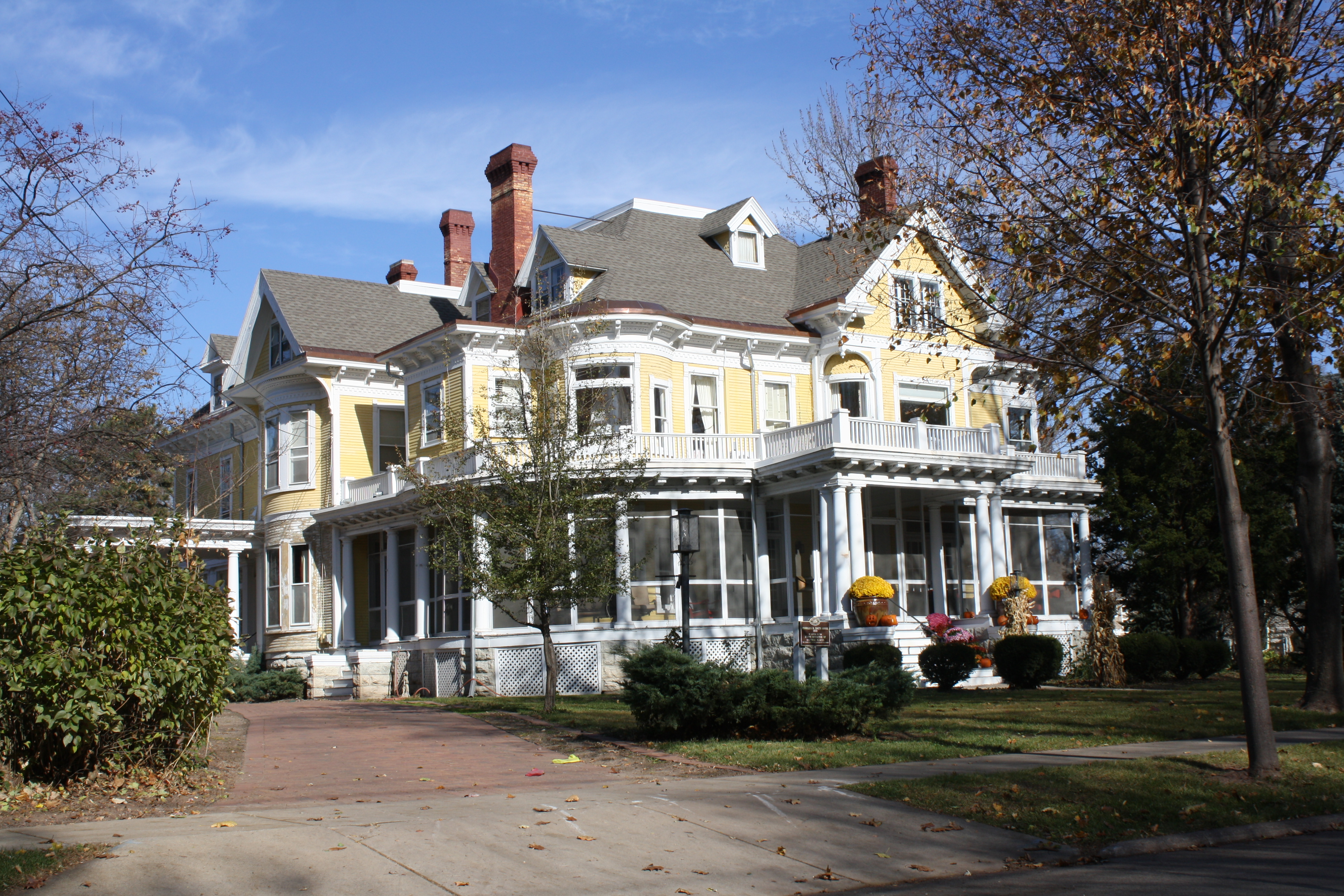
Charles R. Smith House

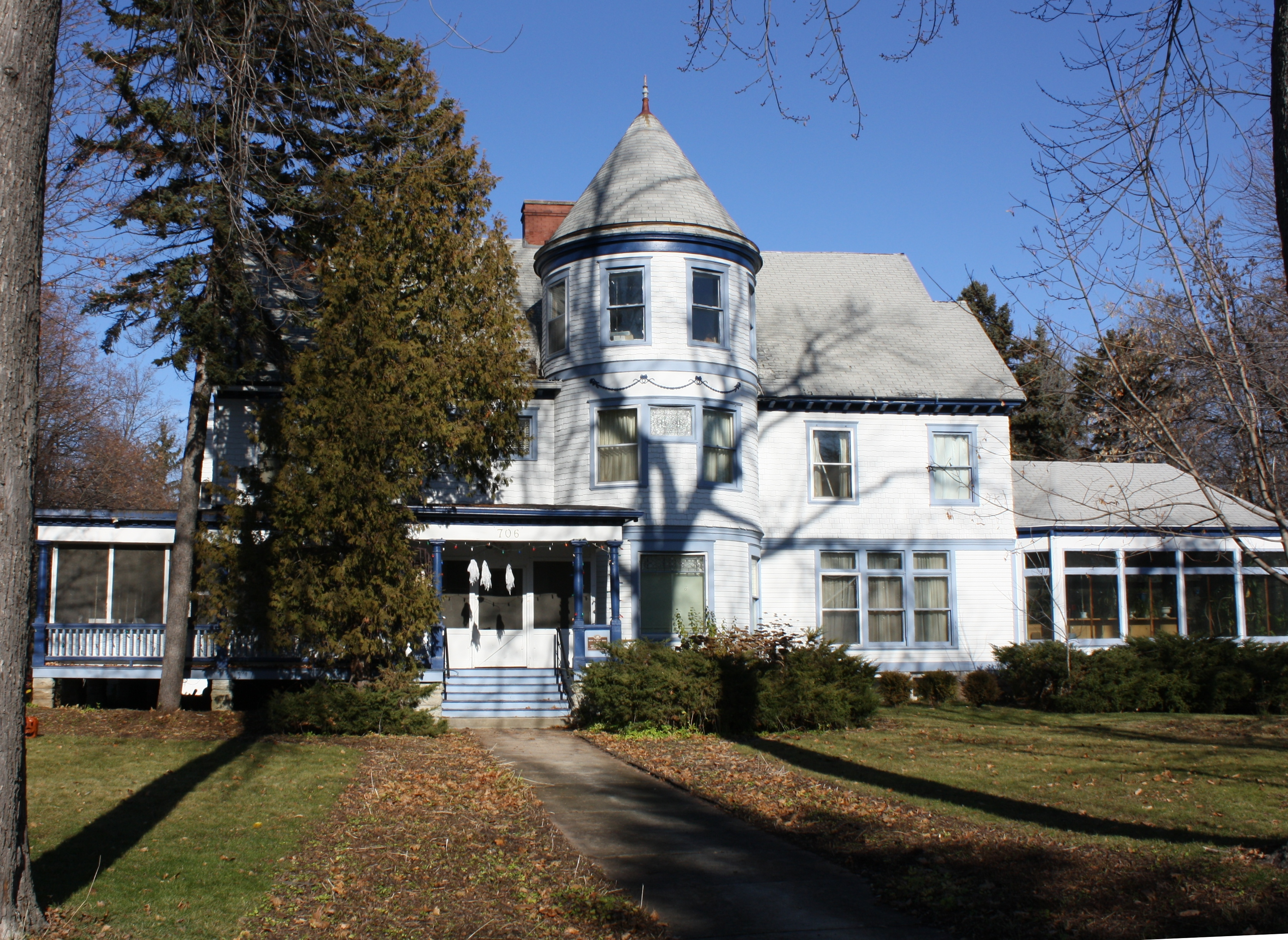
Henry Spencer Smith House

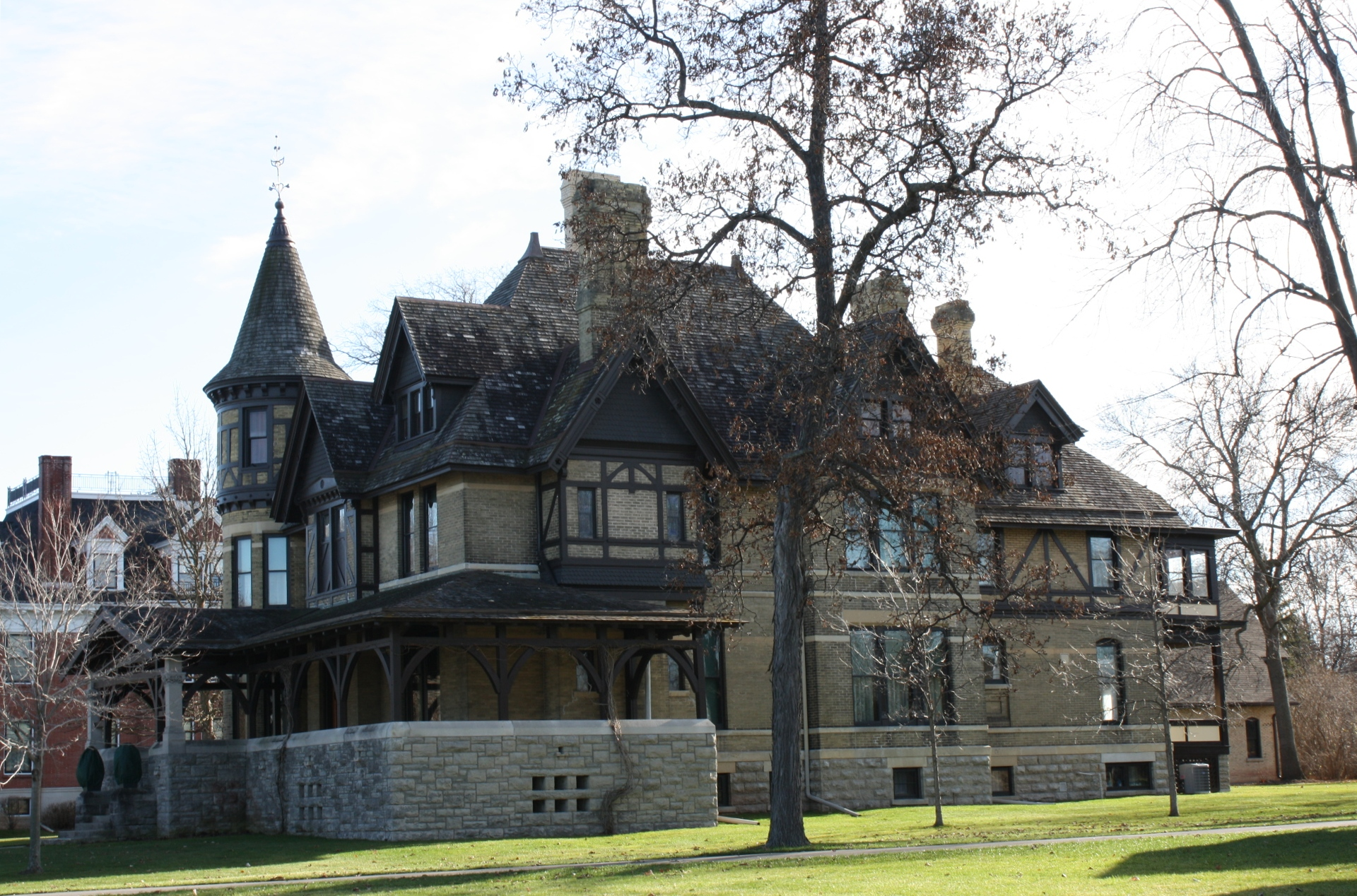
Havilah Babcock House

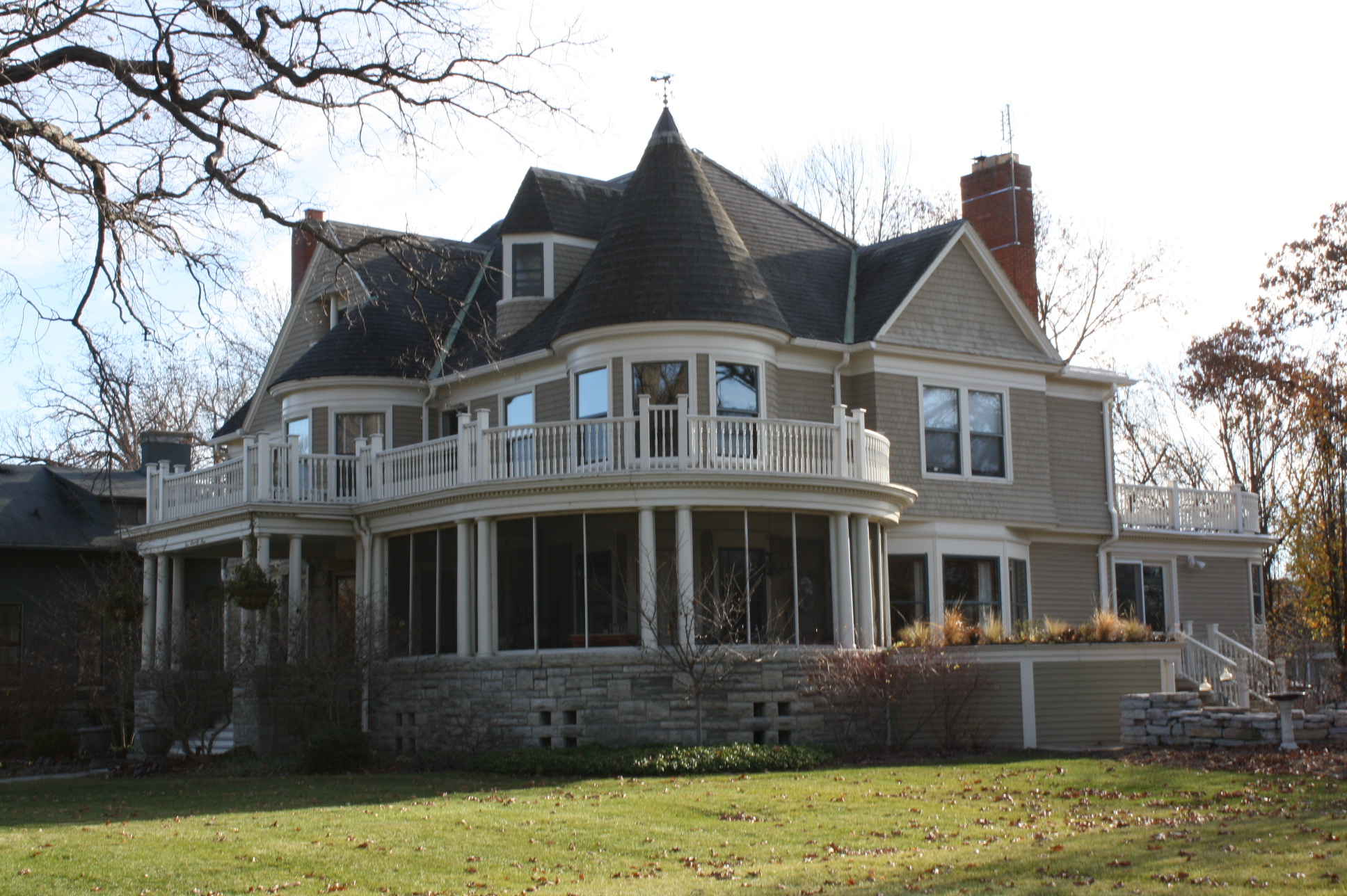
George O. Bergstrom House

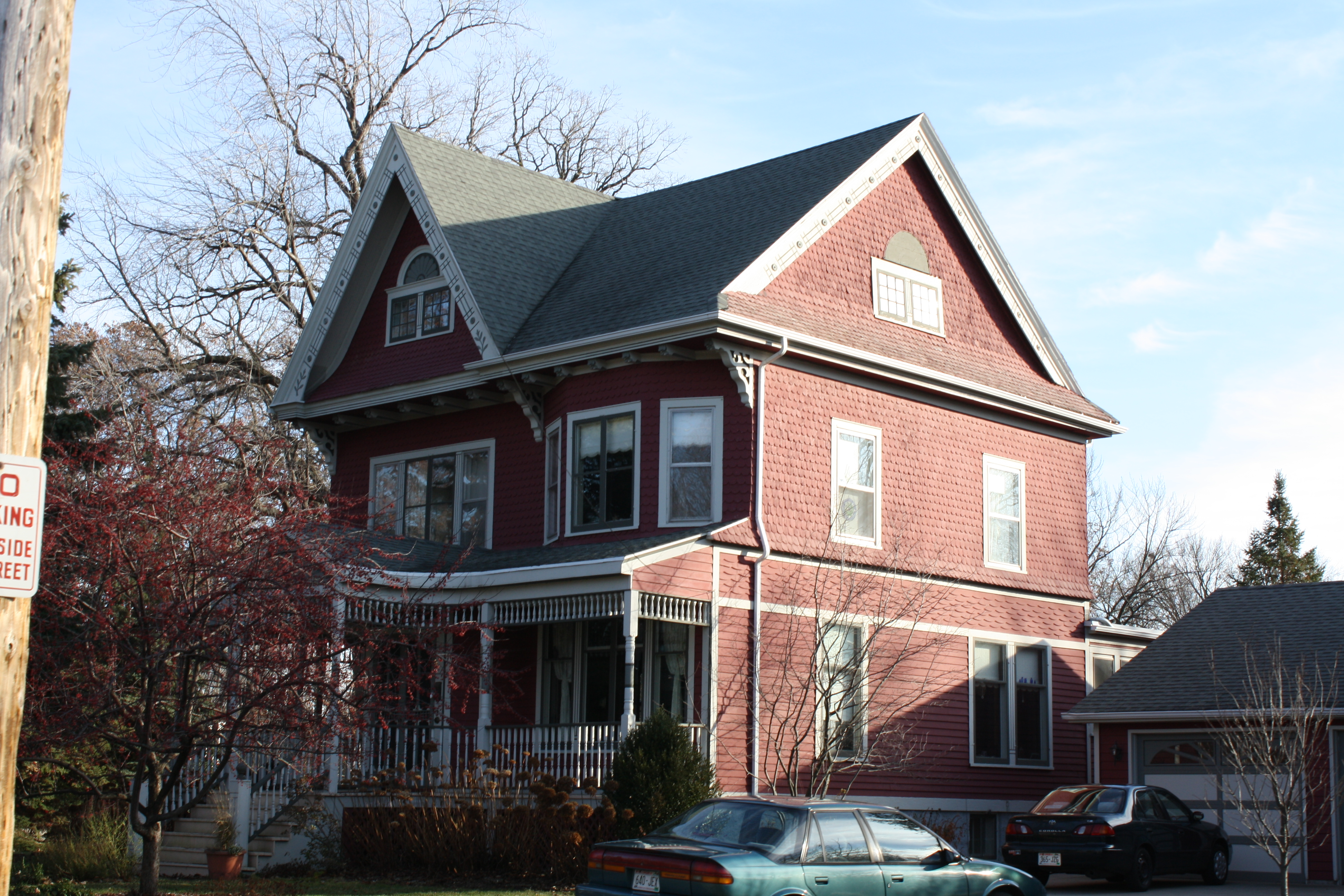
Ellis Jennings House

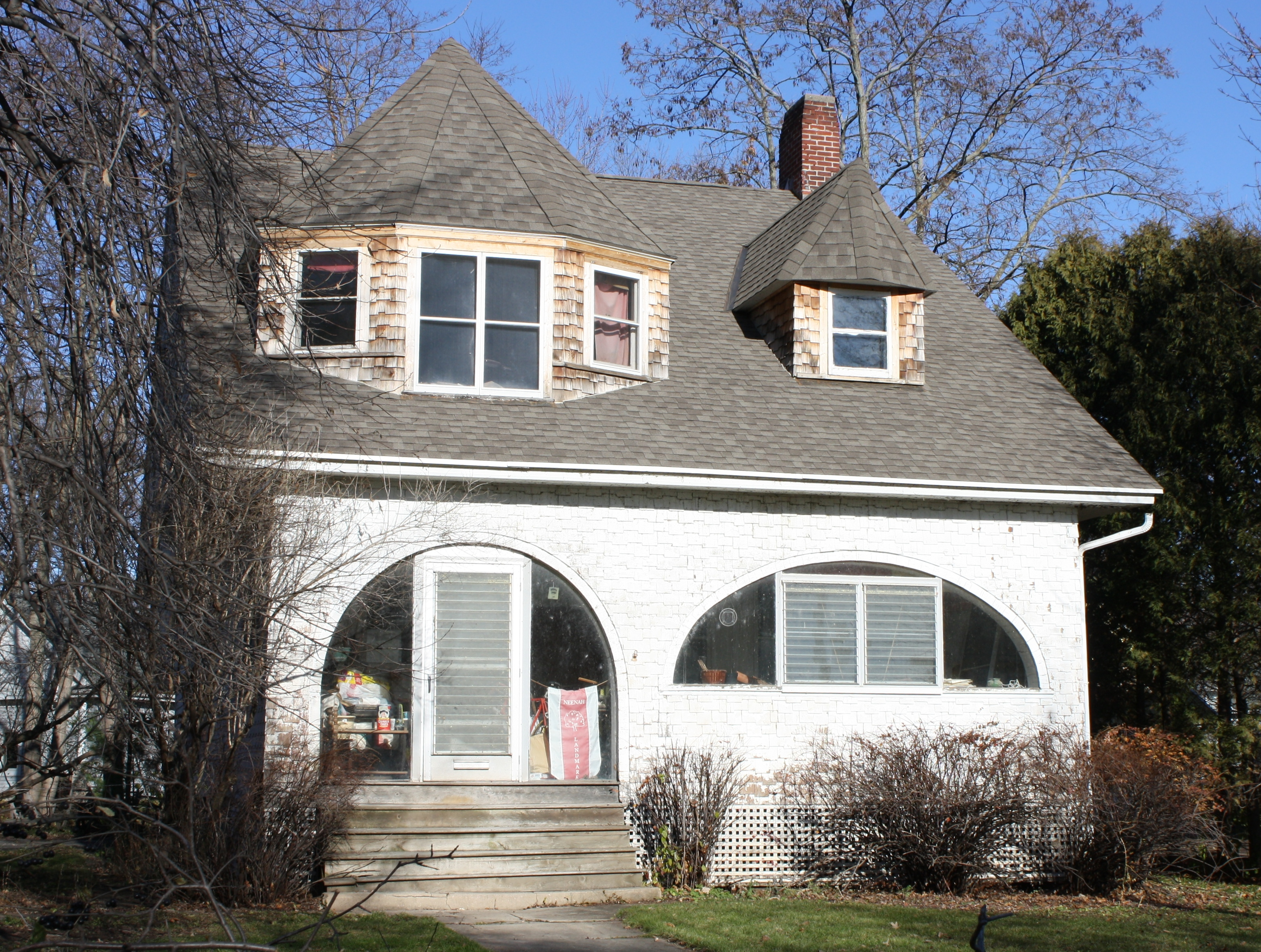
Perry Lindsley House

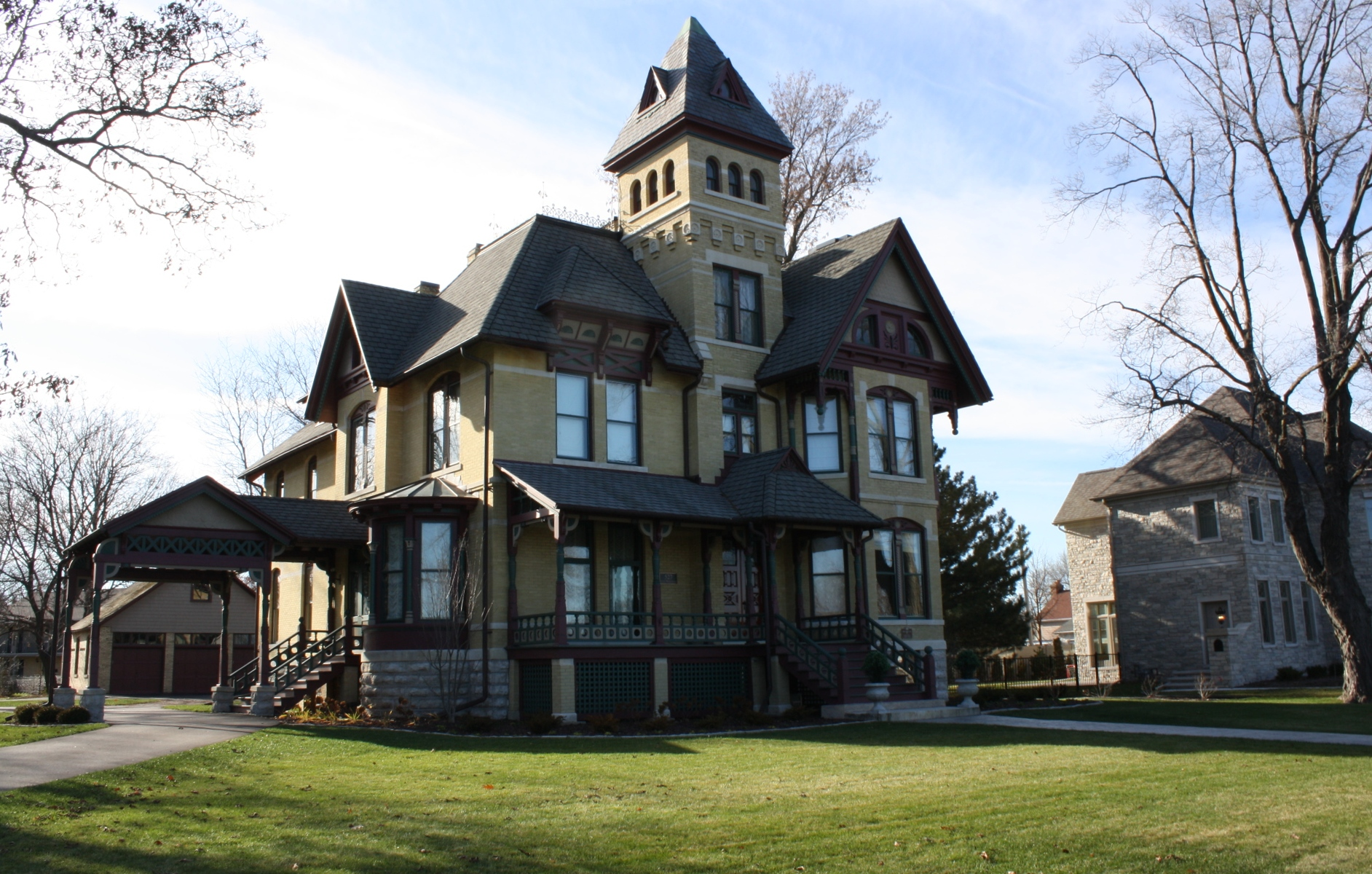
Henry Sherry House

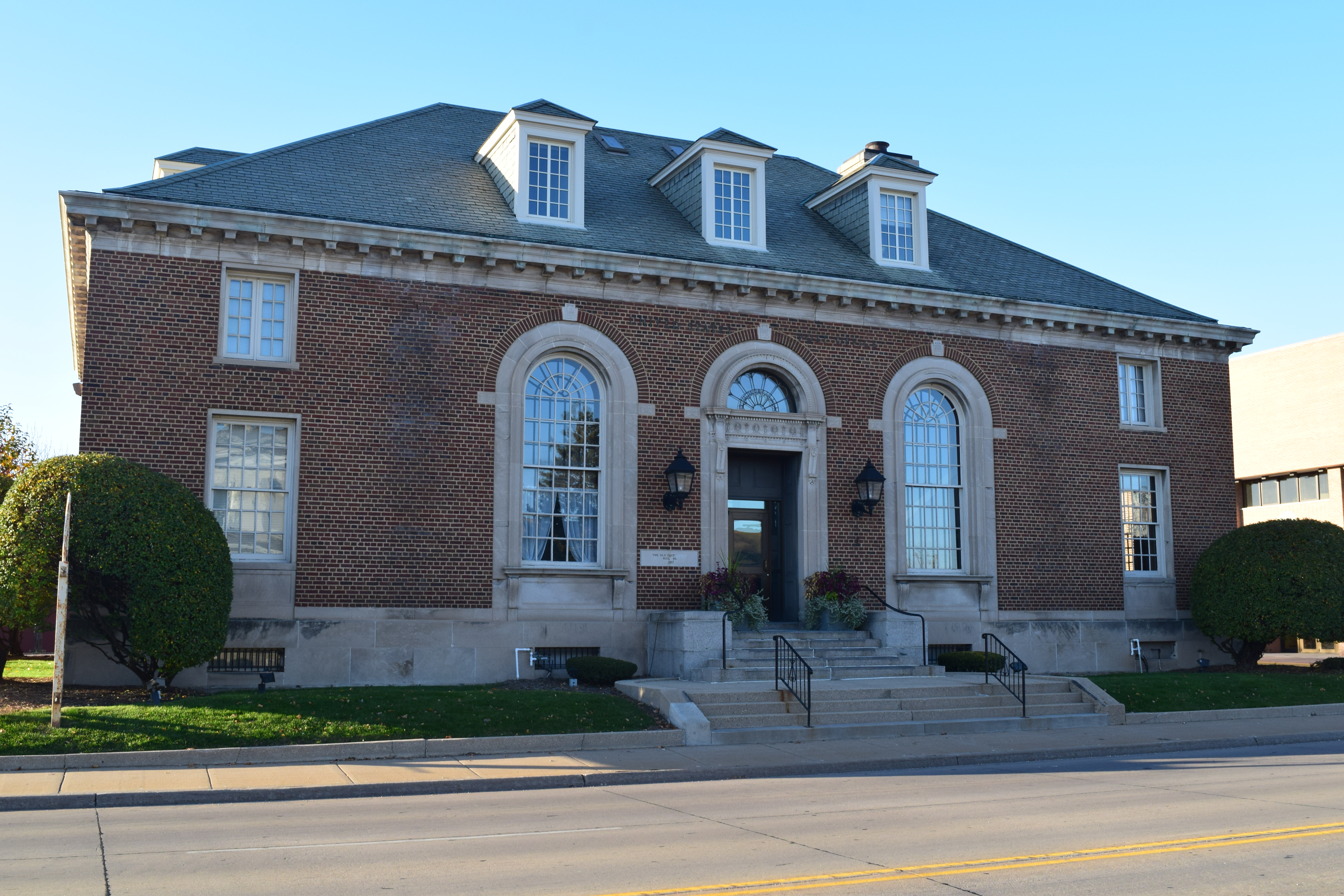
Former Post Office

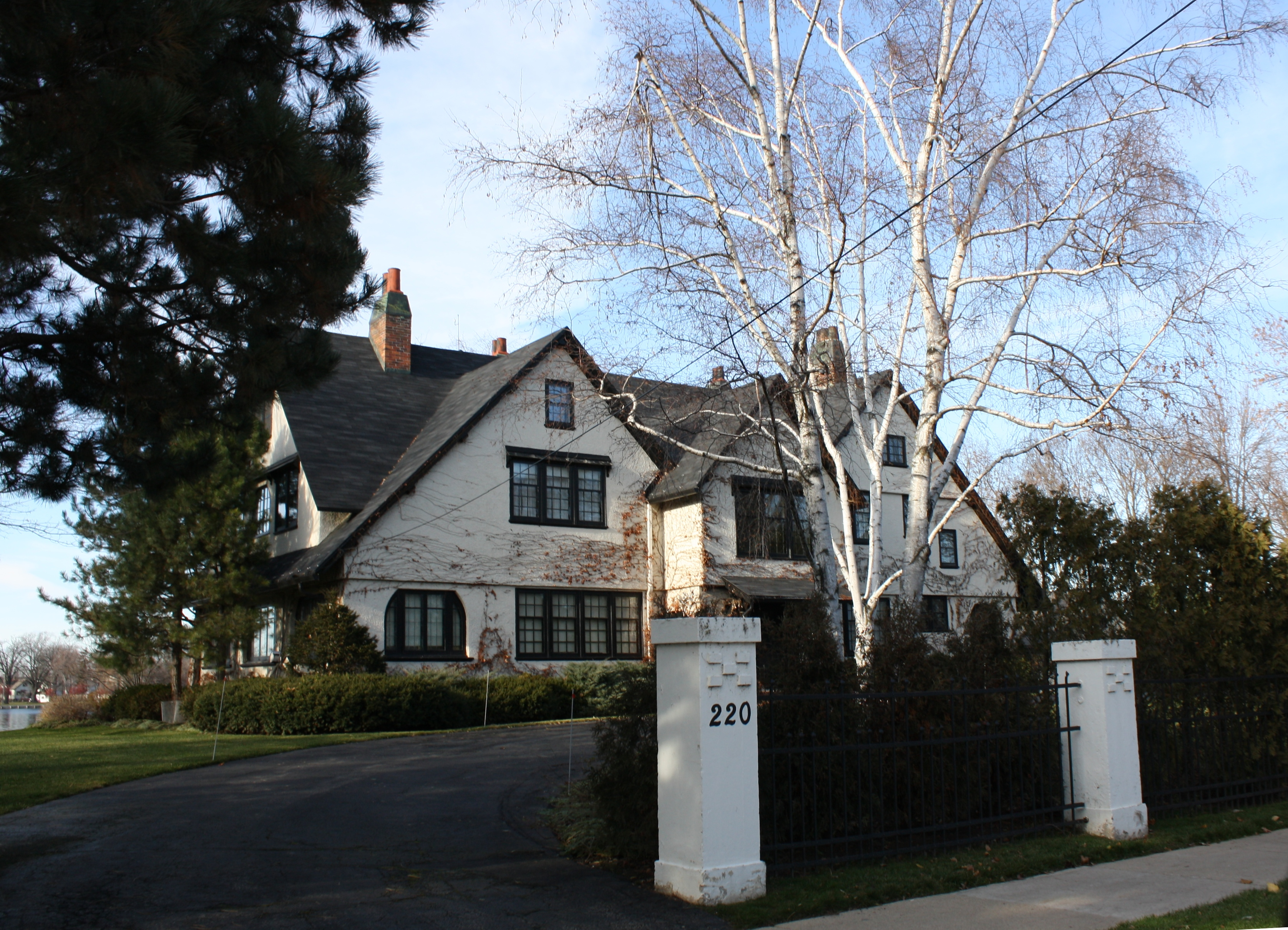
Edward D. & Vina Shattuck Beals House

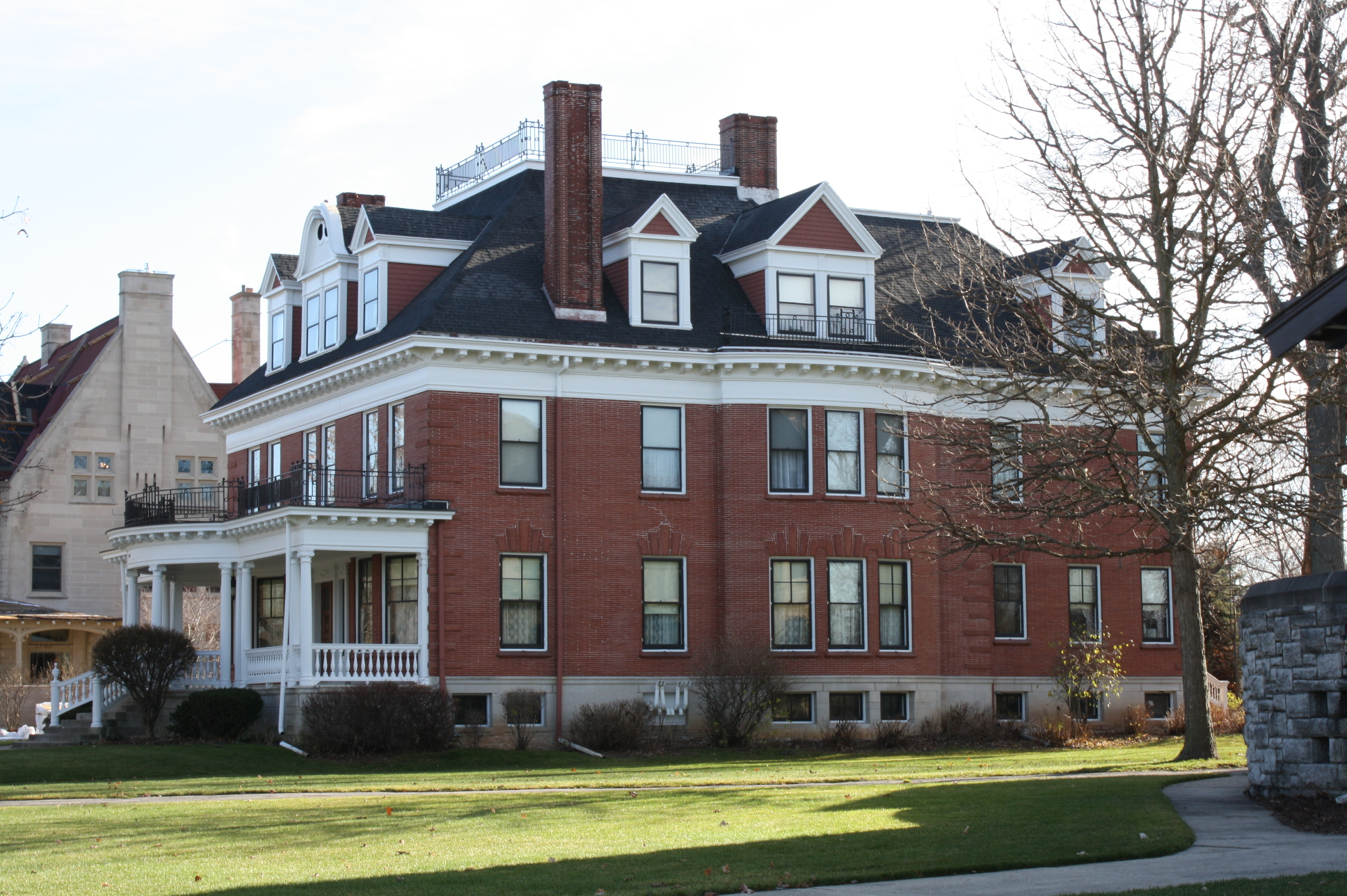
Franklyn C. Shattuck House
