= Franklyn C. Shattuck House =

Historic house in Wisconsin, United States

- U.S. National Register of Historic Places
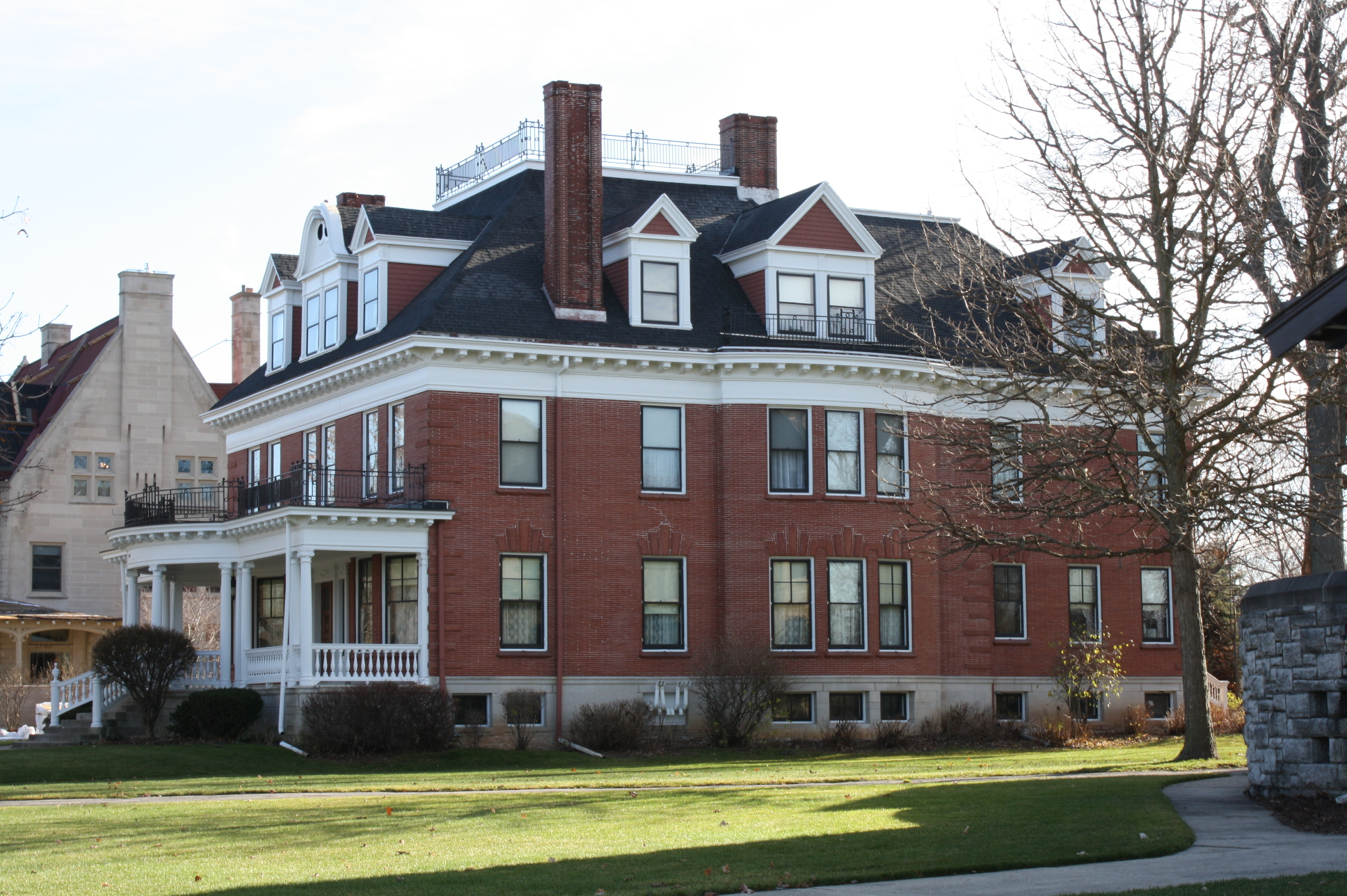
- Franklyn C. Shattuck House
- Location: 547 E. Wisconsin Ave., Neenah, Wisconsin
- Coordinates: 44°10′51″N 88°27′02″W
- Area: 0.7 acres (0.28 ha)
- Built: 1890/1893/1905
- Architect: Ferry & Clas
- Architectural style: Colonial Revival
- NRHP reference No.: 78000153
- Added to NRHP: December 4, 1978

The Franklyn C. Shattuck House is located in Neenah, Wisconsin.

== History ==
Franklyn C. Shattuck was a co-founder of Kimberly-Clark. The house was listed on the National Register of Historic Places in 1978 and on the State Register of Historic Places in 1989.

The Edward D. & Vina Shattuck Beals House, located in Neenah and having belonged to Shattuck's daughter, is also listed on both registers.
