= Algoma =

Algoma may refer to:

== Businesses and organisations ==
- Algoma Central Railway, Northern Ontario
  - Algoma Central Corporation
- Algoma Foundry and Machine Company, Algoma, Wisconsin, U.S.
- Algoma Treatment and Remand Centre, a prison in Sault Ste. Marie, Ontario, Canada
- Algoma University, Ontario, Canada
- Essar Steel Algoma, formerly Algoma Steel, a Canadian steel producer

== Places ==
- Algoma District, Ontario, Canada
- Algoma, Mississippi, U.S.
- Algoma, Oregon, U.S.
- Algoma, West Virginia, U.S.
- Algoma, Wisconsin, a city in Kewaunee County, Wisconsin, U.S.
- Algoma, Wisconsin, a former village in Winnebago County, Wisconsin, that became part of the city of Oshkosh, Wisconsin
- Algoma, Winnebago County, Wisconsin, a town, U.S.
- Algoma Boulevard Historic District, Oshkosh, Wisconsin, U.S.
- Algoma Township, Michigan, U.S.

== Ships ==
- SS Algoma, a ship wrecked in 1885 in Lake Superior, U.S.
- HMCS Algoma, a 1941 Flower-class corvette
- Algoma-class sloop, post-American Civil War era screw sloop
- USS Algoma, renamed USS Benicia, American screw sloop

== See also ==
- Alcona (disambiguation)
- Algona (disambiguation)
