= Battle of Goma =

The Battle of Goma may refer to:

- 2008 Nord-Kivu campaign
- Battle of Goma (2012); see timeline of Goma
- Battle of Goma (2025)

== See also ==
- Goma (disambiguation)
