= Goma (disambiguation) =

Goma is a city in the Democratic Republic of Congo.

Goma or GOMA may also refer to:

== Places ==
=== Democratic Republic of Congo ===
- University of Goma, a public university
- Roman Catholic Diocese of Goma, a diocese in the Ecclesiastical province of Bukavu
- Goma International Airport, an airport serving Goma
- Goma (commune), a commune of the city of Goma in North Kivu, Democratic Republic of the Congo

=== Elsewhere ===
- Guma, Pishan County, also spelled as Goma, a town in Xinjiang, China
- Goma Station, a railway station in Nantan, Kyoto Prefecture, Japan
- Goma (Mexico City Metrobús), a BRT station in Mexico City
- Goma (Siachen), a village in the Saltoro Valley of Baltistan, Pakistan

== People ==
- Goma people, an ethnic group in Kigoma region

=== Surname ===
- Alain Goma (born 1972), French footballer
- Guy Goma (born 1969), accidental TV pundit
- Isidro Goma y Tomas (1869–1940), Spanish Roman Catholic Cardinal
- Louis Sylvain Goma (born 1941), Congolese politician
- Michel Goma (born 1932), French fashion designer
- Paul Goma (born 1935), Romanian writer
- Yadvinder Goma (born 1986), Indian politician

== Given name ==
- Goma Lambu (born 1984), DR-Congo-born English footballer

=== Characters ===
- Goma (character), a character in the Legend of Zelda game series

== Galleries ==
- Gallery of Modern Art, Glasgow, Scotland, UK
- Gallery of Modern Art, Brisbane, Australia

== Other uses ==
- Homa (ritual), an ancient Buddhist fire ritual
- Goma (software), finite element application
- Battle of Goma (disambiguation)

== See also ==
- Goma-2, a high explosive
- Goma-ae, a Japanese side dish
- Gomer, in the Hebrew Bible
- Kingdom of Gomma, Ethiopia
- Gomma (woreda), Ethiopia
- Oliver N'Goma (1959–2010), Gabonese singer
- Ngoma (disambiguation)
- Gomashio, sesame seeds and salt used as a seasoning
- Algoma (placename), a placename given to many different places throughout the US and Canada
