= 2008 Nord-Kivu campaign =

Armed conflict in the Democratic Republic of the Congo

- Part of the Kivu conflict
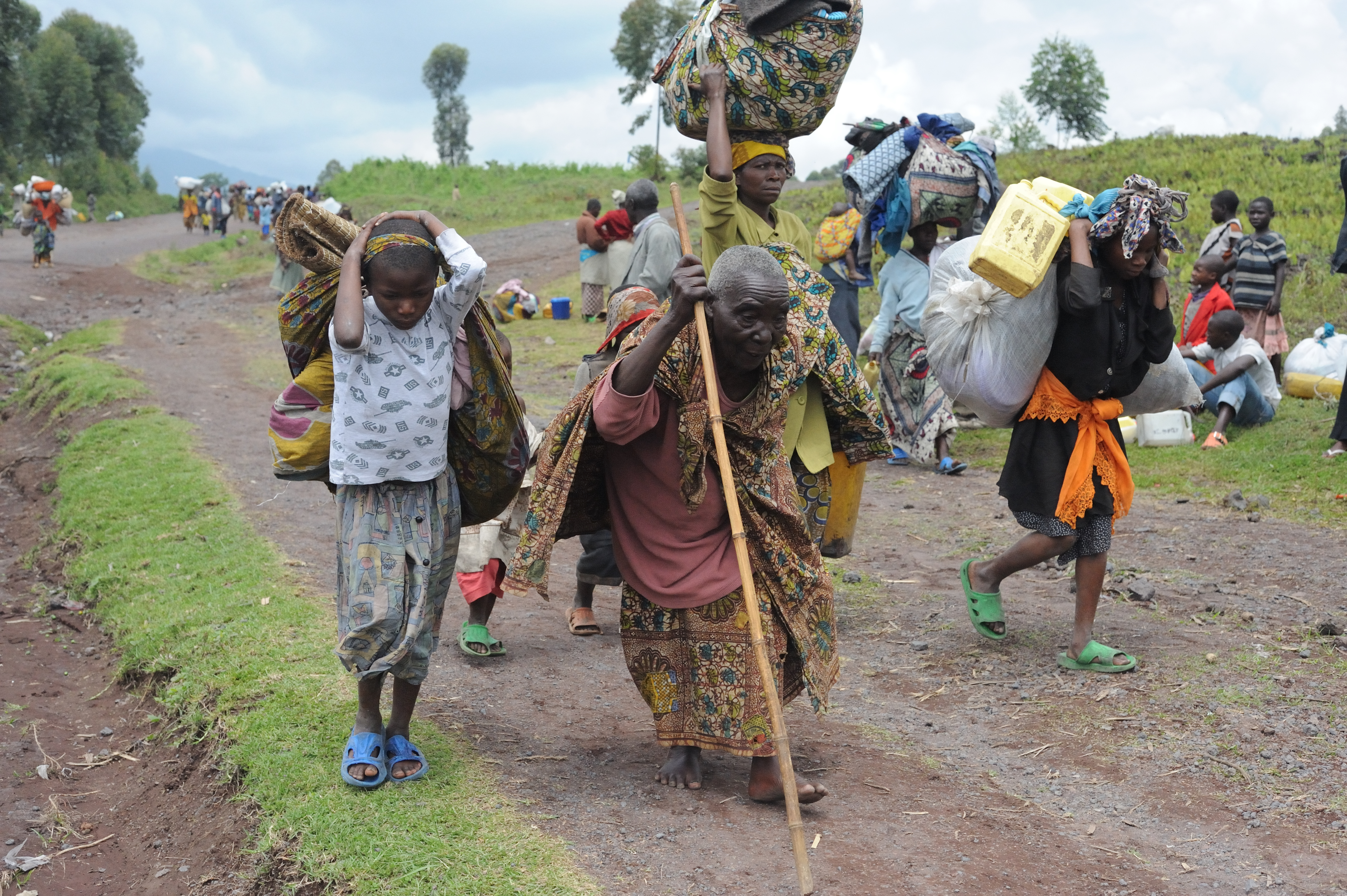
- Villagers fleeing from a Kibati village Map of the CNDP offensive
Date	October 26, 2008 – March 23, 2009 (4 months and 25 days)
Location	Eastern Nord-Kivu, Democratic Republic of the Congo
Status	Congolese government victory

Belligerents
CNDP	Democratic Republic of the Congo (United Nations) MONUC; Mai-Mai militia (until November, 18) (Rwanda) FDLR; Angola; Zimbabwe

Commanders and leaders
Laurent Nkunda	(Democratic Republic of the Congo) Joseph Kabila (United Nations) Lieutenant General Babacar Gaye (Democratic Republic of the Congo) Sikuli Lafontaine (Mai-Mai commander) (Rwanda) Ignace Murwanashyaka (Angola) José Eduardo dos Santos (Zimbabwe) Robert Mugabe

Strength
6,000	20,000 (government); 6,000 (United Nations) (with 1000 in Goma); 3,500 (Mai-Mai); 6000–7000 (Rwandan Hutu rebels)

Casualties and losses
Unknown	3+ soldiers killed (army), 4 soldiers wounded (UN); ~60 fighters killed (Mai-Mai)
- 100+ children raped 100+ civilians killed

The 2008 Nord-Kivu campaign was an armed conflict in the eastern Nord-Kivu province of the Democratic Republic of the Congo. The upsurge of violence in the Kivu conflict saw heavy battles between the Democratic Republic of Congo's army, supported by the United Nations, and Tutsi militia under General Laurent Nkunda.

The fighting, which began on October 25, uprooted 250,000 civilians — bringing the total of people displaced by the Kivu conflict to more than 2 million. The campaign caused widespread civil unrest, large food shortages and what the United Nations called "a humanitarian crisis of catastrophic dimensions". After a week, a ceasefire was ordered by rebel forces amongst civil and military unrest in Goma. The rebel capture of all territory around Goma created a very fragile atmosphere of peace, caused enormous political damage, and called to question the efficacy of the peacekeepers stationed there. After a short cease-fire ordered by rebel general Laurent Nkunda, fighting broke out on November 17, after which a second ceasefire was called into effect on November 19. A buffer zone between rebel and government lines, referred to as a "humanitarian aid corridor", was created on November 23 to allow the transportation of aid to isolated civilian centers. On December 9, bilateral peace talks started between delegations from the Congolese government and Nkunda's rebels. Major fighting largely subsided after Nkunda's capture in January 2009.

The continuous state of conflict affecting DR Congo since 1997 has been referred to as the deadliest since World War II, with aid agencies estimating a death rate of 1,200 to 1,400 civilians a day.

== Background ==
Nkunda's rebels had been active in Nord-Kivu, a province bordering Lake Kivu in the east of the Democratic Republic of Congo, since 2004, when they occupied Bukavu and allegedly committed war crimes. The aim of Nkunda's troops was to protect the Tutsi minority, which were believed to lack adequate protection against further genocidal attacks by the Hutus, who were, in turn, believed by Nkunda to have benefited from government support during the Second Congo War. Earlier, in January 2008, Nkunda's rebels had participated in peace talks; at one point they walked out, saying that other parties had attempted to arrest a member, but later returned. The talks ended with the rebels being granted immunity in exchange for withdrawing troops and allowing civilians to resettle.

== Timeline ==
=== CNDP push towards Goma ===
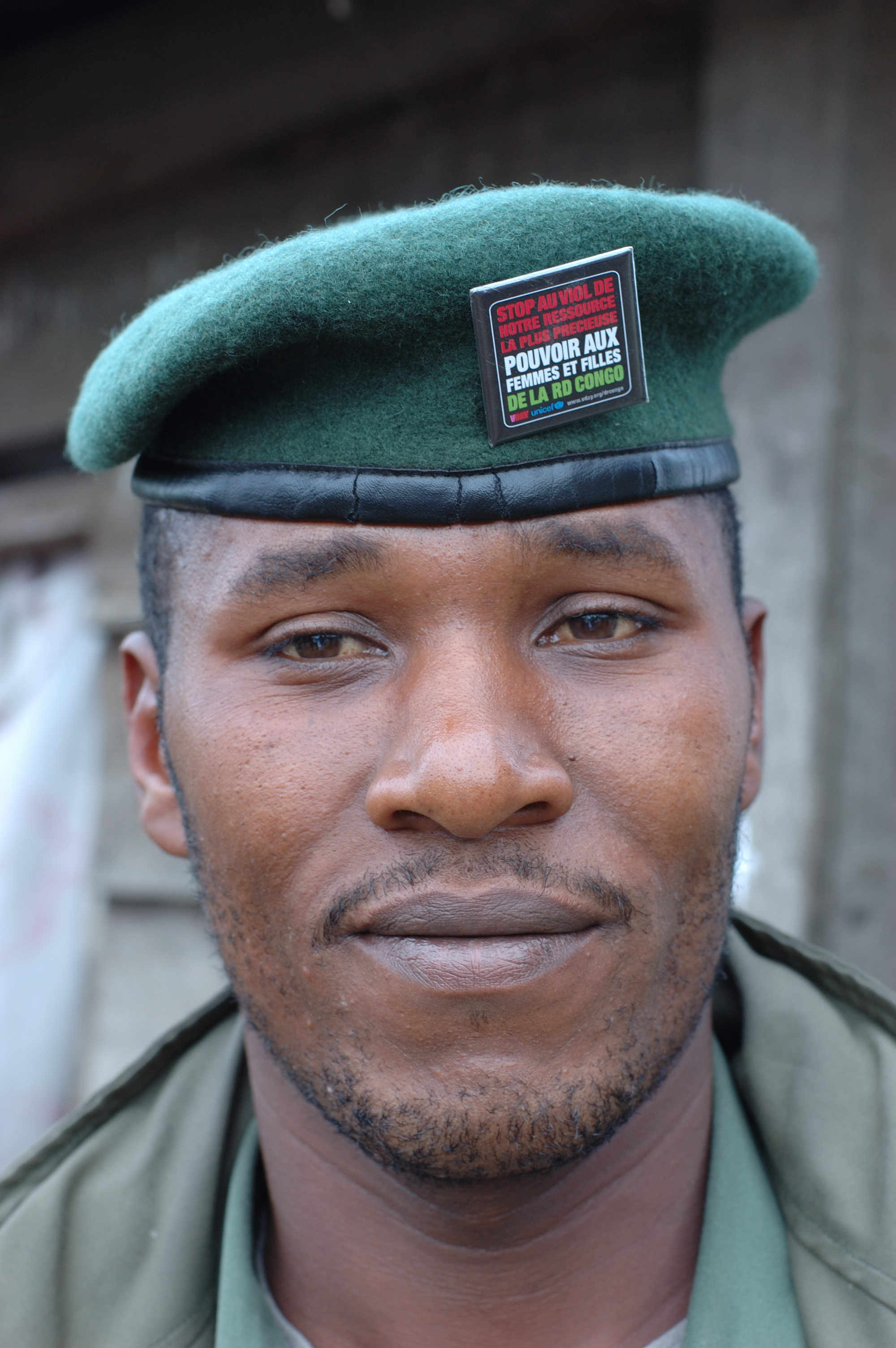
A CNDP rebel

On October 26, 2008, Nkunda's rebels seized a major military camp, along with the strategically located Virunga National Park, situated on a main road leading to the city of Goma, for use as staging points. This occurred after a peace treaty failed, with the resultant fighting displacing thousands.

On October 27, 2008, riots began around the United Nations compound in Goma. Civilians pelted the building with rocks and threw Molotov cocktails, claiming that the UN forces had done nothing to prevent the CNDP advance. The Congolese national army also carried out a "major retreat" due to pressure from the CNDP forces. Meanwhile, United Nations gunships and armoured vehicles were used in an effort to halt the advance of the CNDP, who claimed to be within 11 kilometres (7 mi) of Goma. Special Representative of the UN Secretary-General Alan Doss explained the necessity of engaging the CNDP, stating that "...[the UN] can't allow population centers to be threatened... [the UN] had to engage." During the riots, there was at least one death due to a stampeding crowd.

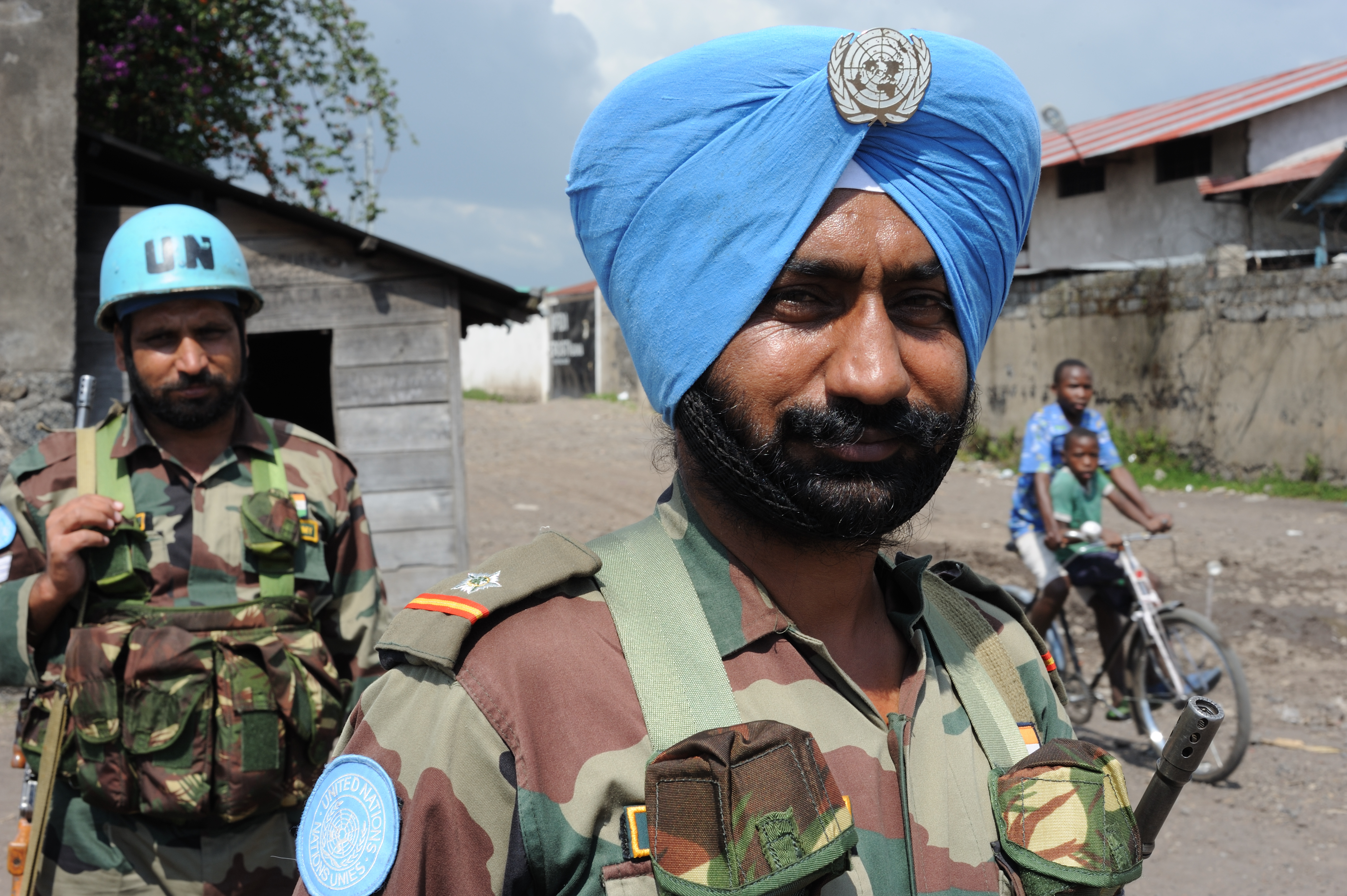
Indian peacekeepers on duty, protecting aid workers.

[in response to seeing government troops retreat] "What are they doing? They are supposed to protect us."

— Internal refugee Jean-Paul Maombi

"We have reinforced our presence [in the region]... We have put all our resources on alert to deter any further progression, trying to contain the aggression in those areas. CNDP is not listening to anyone anymore."

— MONUC spokeswoman Sylvie van den Wildenberg

On October 28, 2008, five rocket-propelled grenades were fired at a convoy of UN vehicles protecting a road to the territorial capital of Rutshuru, hitting two armoured personnel carriers. The APCs, which contained Indian Army troops, were relatively undamaged, though a Lieutenant Colonel and two other personnel were injured. CNDP forces later captured Rutshuru. Meanwhile, civilians continued to riot, at some points pelting retreating Congolese troops with rocks, though UN spokeswoman Sylvie van den Wildenberg stated that the UN has "reinforced [their] presence" in the region.

=== Ceasefire ===
On October 29, 2008, the CNDP declared a unilateral ceasefire as they approached Goma, though they still intended to take the city. That same day a French request for an EU reinforcement of 1,500 troops was refused by several countries and appeared unlikely to materialize; however, the UN forces in place stated they would act to prevent takeovers of population centers. Throughout the day the streets of the city were filled with refugees and fleeing troops, including their tanks and other military vehicles. There were also reports of looting and commandeering of cars by Congolese troops. That night the UN Security Council unanimously adopted a non-binding resolution which condemned the recent CNDP advance and demanded it be halted. According to analysts, the ceasefire was called to preserve Nkunda's reputation, as was his later order of creating an aid corridor.

Despite the ceasefire, the situation remained volatile; according to World Vision spokesman Michael Arunga, World Vision workers had to flee to the Rwandan border in order to survive, and shots were still being fired. The United States Department of State reported sending Assistant Secretary of State for African Affairs Jendayi Frazer as an envoy to the region.

On October 30, 2008, looting and violence by Congolese soldiers, some of them drunk, continued in Goma, though contingents of other troops and paramilitary police attempted to contain the looting by patrolling the streets in pick-up trucks. One soldier was even accused of killing a family of six, and would be court-martialed along with 11 troops who participated. Another 11 were sentenced to life in prison. Nkunda called for direct talks with the Congolese government, also stating that he would take Goma "if there is no ceasefire, no security and no advance in the peace process".

=== Diplomatic and humanitarian effort ===
On October 31, 2008, Nkunda declared that he would create a "humanitarian aid corridor", a no-fire zone where displaced persons would be allowed back to their homes, given the consent of the United Nations task force in the Congo. Working with the UN forces around Goma, Nkunda hoped to relocate victims of the recent fighting between his CNDP forces and UN peacekeepers (MONUC). MONUC spokesman Kevin Kennedy stated that MONUC's forces were stretched thin trying to keep peace within and around the city; recent looting by Congolese soldiers had made it harder to do so as incidents arose both within city limits and outside. According to Anneke Van Woudenberg, a Human Rights Watch researcher, more than 20 people were killed overnight in Goma alone. Meanwhile, Secretary of State Condoleezza Rice contacted Rwandan President Paul Kagame to discuss a long-term solution.

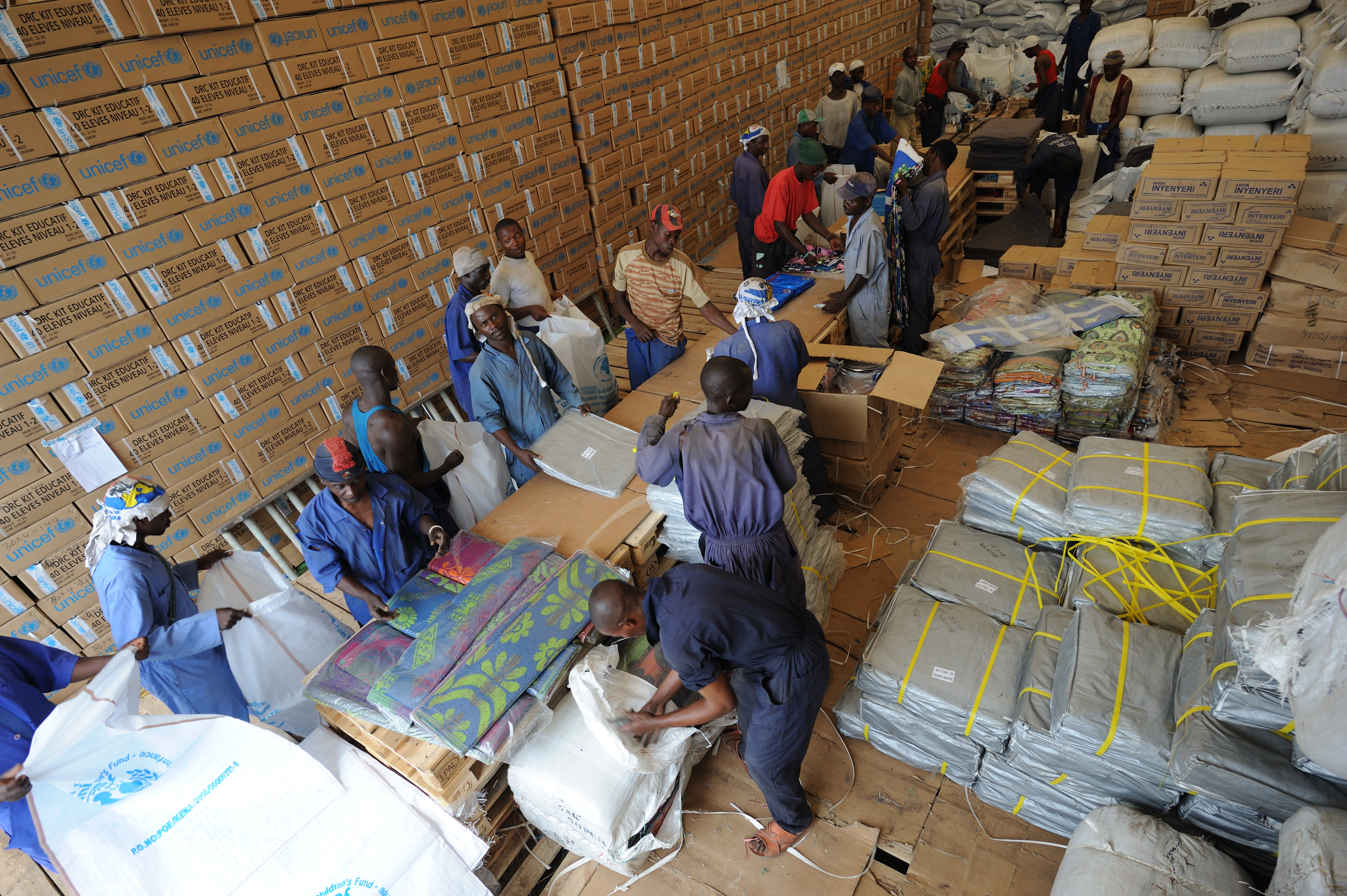
UNICEF workers distributing aid to refugees.

Also on October 31, 2008, British Foreign Minister David Miliband and French Foreign Minister Bernard Kouchner flew to the region, with the intention of stopping in Kinshasa, Goma, and possibly Kigali. Miliband said that the United Kingdom was providing £42 million in humanitarian aid to the area.

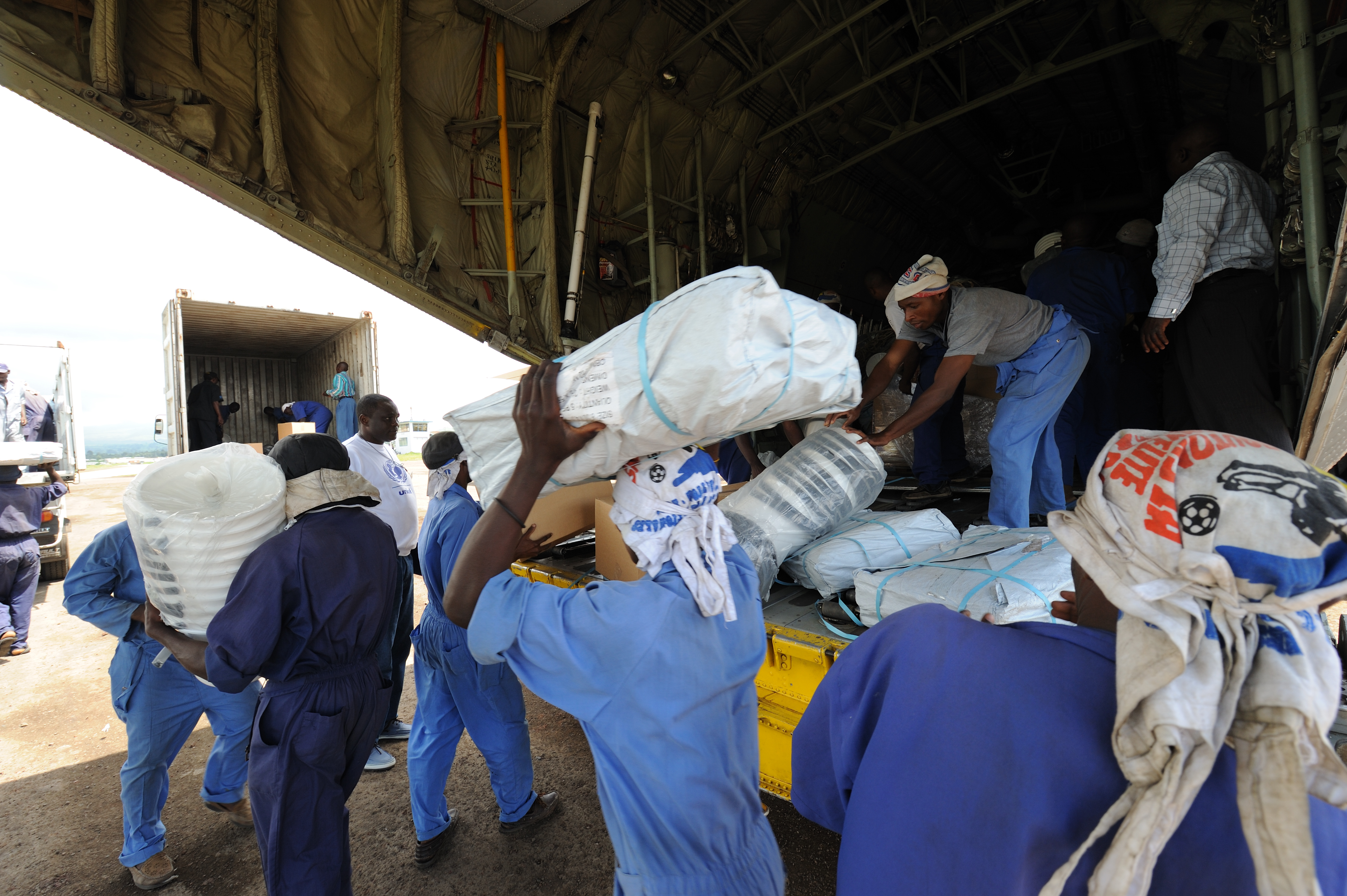
The first aid flight from the United Kingdom being unloaded on November 11, 2008.

On November 17, 2008, Nkunda met with UN special envoy and former President of Nigeria Olusegun Obasanjo to discuss the ceasefire amongst reports of scattered fighting in the Congo. While he backed the ceasefire, rebel troops were still reported to be active, and would later capture a village by force.

=== Battle for Kiwanja ===
On November 5, 2008, fighting erupted for the control of the town of Kiwanja, 72 km (45 mi) north of Goma. The main opponents of the rebels during the battle were Mai-Mai and Hutu Rwandan militias, who were aligned with the government. During the fighting, Congo's army was firing mortars toward rebel positions from behind militia lines. On November 6, in the nearby village of Mabenga, a Belgian journalist working for a German newspaper was kidnapped by the Mai-Mai along with his assistant and three rebel fighters. Also, Congolese journalist Alfred Nzonzo Bitwahiki Munyamariza was reported to have been shot and killed in Rutshuru during a stampede that followed the attack on Kiwanja. However, it was later confirmed that he, along with his family, escaped after rebels destroyed his house with a rocket. The battle had ended by the end of the second day of fighting, with rebel forces wresting control of Kiwanja from the Mai-Mai.

When the civilian population started to return to the town on November 7, 2008, they reported finding more than a dozen bodies in the town. The villagers said rebels had killed unarmed civilians suspected of supporting the Mai-Mai, but the rebels said the dead were militia fighters who had been armed. A U.N. official said there were two rounds of executions in the town. First the Mai-Mai arrived and killed those they accused of supporting the rebels, then the rebels stormed in, killing men they charged were loyal to the Mai-Mai. Human Rights Watch said at least 20 people were killed and another 33 wounded during the battle for the town. Rebel Capt. John Imani said about 60 people had been killed in the fighting, mostly Mai-Mai.

The Human Rights Watch would later find that "at least" 150 had been "summarily executed" by both sides at Kiwanja. HRW also criticized MONUC peacekeeping forces, who had been only 800 m (1/2 mi) away at the time.

=== Fighting resumes ===
Despite the pledges of peace by rebel leader Nkunda, fighting broke out on November 17, 2008, leading to the capture of Rwindi by rebel forces, which advanced throughout the region. Meanwhile, speculation of war crimes increased with UN reports of the death of 26 non-combatants in the village of Kiwanja, who were said to have been killed by rebels for working with government troops. The killings at Kiwanja were later confirmed at 150 or more deaths by the Human Rights Watch. Amongst brutalities was a roadblock formed of two dead Congolese army soldiers, serving as a warning to approaching forces. Recent fighting brought the death toll to approximately 100 civilians, with 200 wounded.

=== Fall of Rwindi ===
On November 17, 2008, after a few days of heavy artillery and mortar fire exchanges between the rebels and the military, the rebels took control of Rwindi, the headquarters of Virunga National Park. Soldiers were reported to be in full retreat and disarray while the rebels marched into the town and continued further north toward Kanyabayonga in a single-file organised column. During the bombardments, prior to the fall of the town, an Indian peacekeeper was wounded in the head by shrapnel while taking shelter in a trench.

=== Army clashes with the Mai-Mai ===
[on why the Mai-Mai were fighting the allied government forces] "We are stopping them and trying to force them back to the front. That is their job. We don't understand how they can flee when the rebels are about to come to Kanyabayonga."

— Pareco Mai-Mai General Sikuli Lafontaine

On November 18, 2008, rebel forces stopped their advance on Kanyabayonga and withdrew, as to create a buffer zone between them and government forces and give a chance for peace talks. Following the halt in fighting between the rebels and the Army, government soldiers started looting the towns of Kirumba and Kayna, but were attacked by the local Mai-Mai group Pareco. The Mai-Mai had been helping the government forces since the start of the conflict in their fight against the rebels. The fighting left five Mai-Mai militiamen and one government soldier dead. The Army said the conflict was the fault of the Mai-Mai, who were attempting to hamper a routine deployment. Following the fighting government soldiers laid out two charred bodies of militiamen on a dirt track in Kirumba.

On November 19, 2008, Mai-Mai militia fighters calling themselves Resistance Congolese Patriots fired on APCs carrying UN peacekeepers. The militia fighters had asked for food and money, but engaged the international force after being denied. At least one of the approximately five fighters was killed, though more were reported to be in the forest. According to Lieutenant Colonel Jean-Paul Dietrich, "It was a rather small incident, but it [was] disturbing because [it was] the second time in a week", referring to the November 18 incident.

The Mai-Mai had been supporting government forces, but began fighting against them with machine guns and RPGs when the government started to retreat, stating that they were "retreating too easily". General Sikuli Lafontaine said that the soldiers "...are cowards. They just flee and then rape and pillage in the cities."

=== Rebel withdrawal and the recapture of Rwindi ===
[on effectiveness of reinforcements] "Reinforcements are not going to resolve all the problems... Reinforcements will allow us to do something about the situation, which has deteriorated fast, help us to stabilize the situation a bit, and allow the political and diplomatic process to go forward. "

— UN spokesman Alan Doss

On November 18, 2008, Nkunda ordered rebel troops to pull back 40 kilometers (25 mi) from the town of Kabasha, citing the need to avoid clashes, get humanitarian aid to the region and create "separation zones" between the government and rebel forces, which would be patrolled by UN peacekeepers; this was amongst the sacking of General Dieudonne Kayembe, armed forces chief of the Congolese army, after a chain of defeats. His replacement was cited as a bid to bolster military strength. According to MONUC commanders the town had been captured on Sunday, though they could not confirm whether withdrawal had begun. Meanwhile, the French Foreign Ministry circulated a draft asking the UN to reinforce the MONUC garrison in the Congo by 3,000. This move was stated as a possible measure of stability, but not one of peace. UN spokesman Alan Doss said that "Reinforcements are not going to resolve all the problems... Reinforcements will allow us to do something about the situation, which has deteriorated fast, help us to stabilize the situation a bit, and allow the political and diplomatic process to go forward." While the United Nations Security Council voted on Wednesday, Doss acknowledged that it could take months to get reinforcements in, but wanted to speed the process. Doss also stated that he believed the humanitarian effort was improving.

On November 19, 2008, hundreds of rebel fighters retreated from the front lines to encourage peace talks. Monitored by UN aerial and ground patrols, the troops were confirmed to be retreating "from Kanyabayonga toward Kibirizi, from Kanyabayonga toward Nyanzale and from Rwindi south", according to Lieutenant Colonel Jean-Paul Dietrich. Witnesses stated that the rebels had moved 33 kilometers (21 mi) south from Kanyabayonga. The retreat was ordered by leader Nkunda, who arranged it after speaking with former Nigerian President Olusegun Obasanjo, where they agreed on another cease-fire. The rebels still held strategic positions near places such as the town of Kibati, facing off with "demoralized" government troops.

On November 20, 2008, dozens of Mai-Mai fighters entered Rwindi, which the rebels had abandoned a few days earlier. The Mai-Mai also attacked rebel forces at the villages of Katoro and Nyongera, in an attempt to advance toward Kiwanja. The rebels stopped them and reported that government and Rwandan Hutu forces from the FDLR were also involved in the fighting.

=== UN reinforcements ===
"[The reinforcements] would help to prevent the atrocities that continue to be committed against civilians on an ever greater scale here in North Kivu [province], on the border of Rwanda and Uganda... Since August 28, fighting has intensified in many areas, causing deaths, rapes, lootings, forced recruitment and further displacements of civilian populations. The population has thus been immersed in unspeakable suffering. In the last few days, fighting has drawn closer to large populated areas, such as the town of Goma. Fighting has also invaded and torn apart the region of Rutshuru, particularly in the town of Kiwanja, where hundreds of civilian deaths have now been recorded."

— Coalitions for reinforcing the UN garrison

On November 18, 2008, a draft resolution spearheaded by the French Foreign Ministry was presented before the United Nations Security Council. The resolution, signed by 44 different organizations and with the backing of the British Foreign Office minister Mark Malloch Brown, asked the UN to send 3,000 more peacekeepers to reinforce the 17,000-strong garrison in the Congo, which is the largest garrison of its kind. This was similar to the pleas of the Human Rights Watch and humanitarian aid groups in the region, who were also asking for reinforcements to bring stability to the area. In a shared statement, the coalition of organizations stated that "[The reinforcements] would help to prevent the atrocities that continue to be committed against civilians on an ever greater scale here in North Kivu [province], on the border of Rwanda and Uganda... Since August 28, 2008, fighting has intensified in many areas, causing deaths, rapes, lootings, forced recruitment and further displacements of civilian populations. The population has thus been immersed in unspeakable suffering. In the last few days, fighting has drawn closer to large populated areas, such as the town of Goma. Fighting has also invaded and torn apart the region of Rutshuru, particularly in the town of Kiwanja, where hundreds of civilian deaths have now been recorded." Local groups in the Congo also requested help from the European Union, as they would be able to deploy soldiers sooner, working as a "bridging force" until the UN reinforcements arrived. British EU spokeswoman Catriona Little stated that they were "not ruling in or out EU forces".

On November 20, 2008, the UN voted unanimously to send 3,085 more peacekeepers, citing "extreme concern at the deteriorating humanitarian situation and in particular the targeted attacks against civilian population, sexual violence, recruitment of child soldiers and summary executions." However, it did not extend MONUC's mandate in the Congo, which expires at the end of 2008. The decision was made despite the rebel commitment to pulling back from the front lines and allowing aid to reach the thousands of people still isolated, according to aid groups.

=== Tension between MONUC and DR Congo troops, opening of humanitarian aid corridor ===
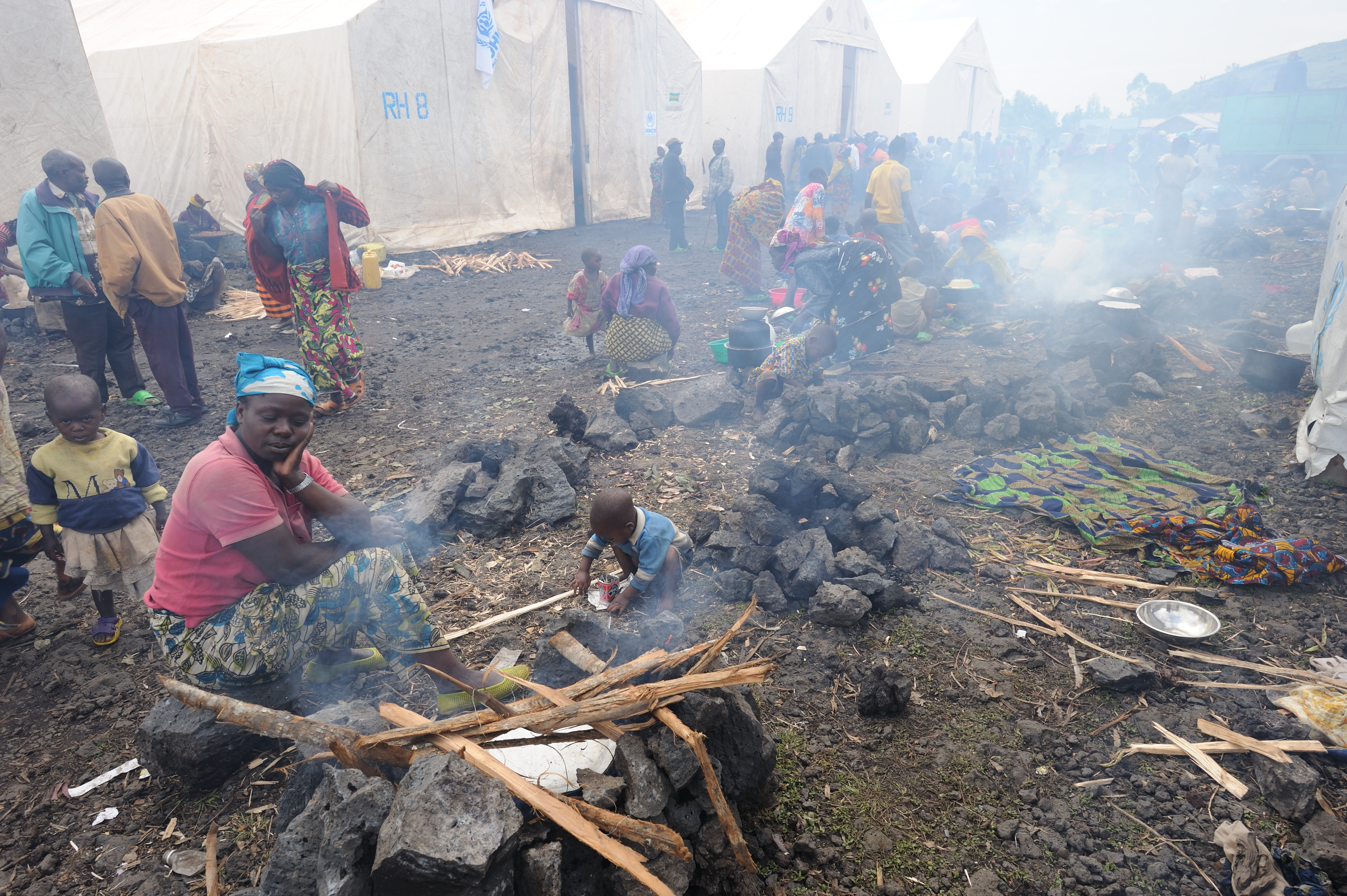
A refugee camp near the Kibati village

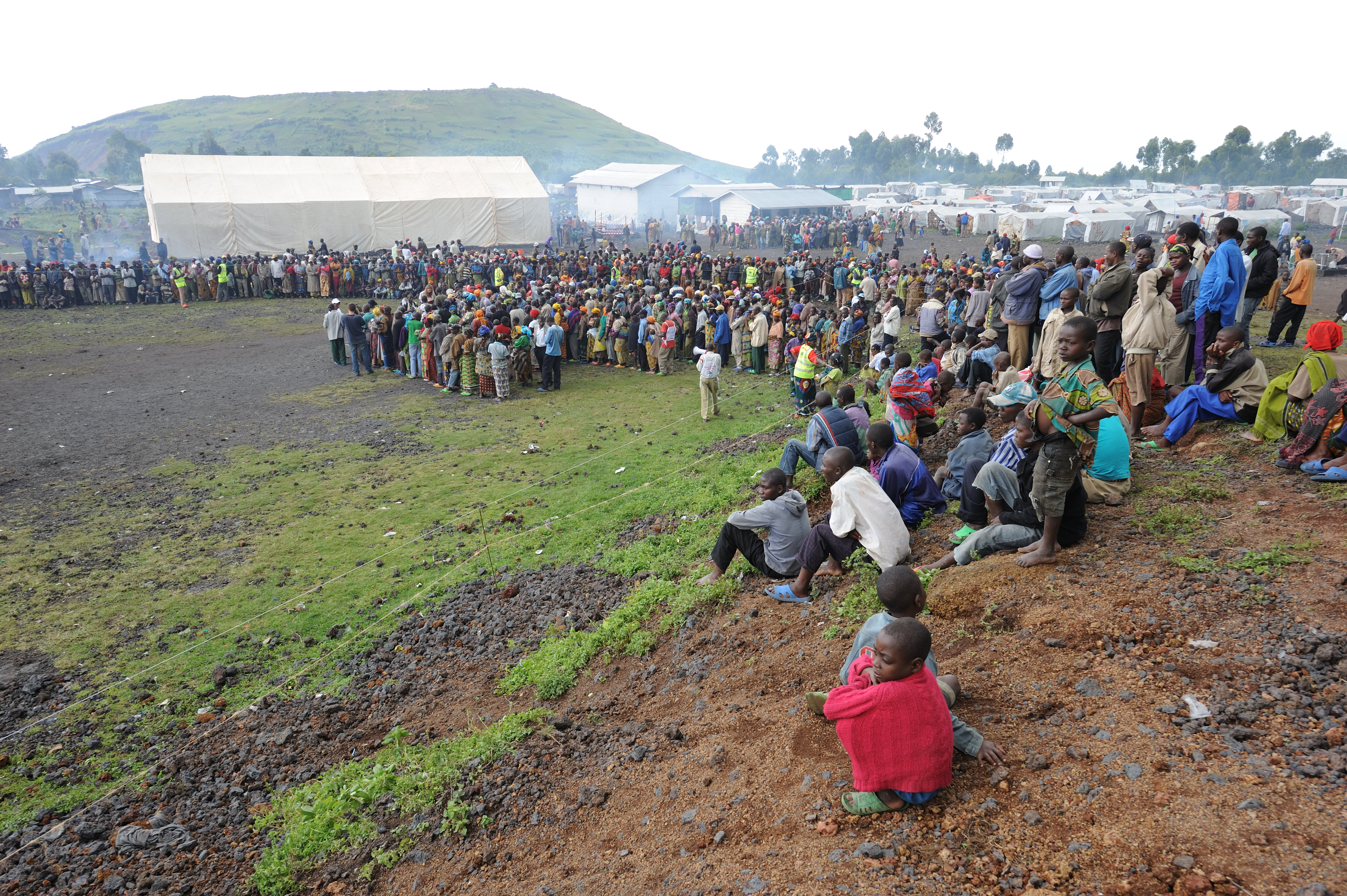
Refugees wait to get supplies

On November 23, 2008, government soldiers intercepted a UN convoy 2 kilometers north of Goma which was carrying 25 suspected Mai-Mai militants, unbeknownst to the government, and removed them, relocating them to Goma on the grounds of suspecting them to be rebel soldiers. The UN, which was transporting the militiamen as an "ongoing disarmament and rehabilitation process", refused to give the militants to the government troops, but eventually let them go; some witness reports stated that the government's troops forcibly removed the militiamen from the UN vehicles while an onlooking crowd insulted and threw stones at the peacekeepers.

While rebel troops did abide by the temporary ceasefire, Nkunda spoke to a crowd of 1,500 in a stadium in the rebel-held town of Rutshuru to tell them to reject the recent deployment of 3,000 more peacekeepers. He stated, "They are sending another 3,000 Blue Helmets and you are applauding. You are mistaken! We will not accept outsiders coming in to provide security for us here. Either you help us in the revolution or you keep quiet with MONUC. But if you wait for MONUC to bring you peace, you can wait forever."

Meanwhile, aid convoys were able to distribute medical supplies throughout the "humanitarian aid corridor", created by the rebel withdrawal. The corridor, patrolled by MONUC troops, allowed aid groups such as Merlin to access Kanyabayonga and Kirumba, which had gone for 10 days without supplies and were nearly depleted. While not nominal, the situation was referred to as "much better". "We're really pleased that we've gotten here", stated spokeswoman Louise Orton.

=== Merge proposal between rebels and government forces ===
"A silent war has been waged against women and children... women and girls in the hundreds have been targets of opportunistic and brutal rape, while children are also being targeted for recruitment or re-recruitment as child soldiers."

— World Vision advocacy director Sue Mbaya

On November 24, 2008, Nkunda expressed a desire to merge his rebel troops with the government's forces, reuniting the two. According to negotiator Olusegun Obasanjo talks were progressing. Obasanjo stated that Nkunda had made "demands that I do not consider outrageous and demands that the government of Congo can meet." Ideally, the talks would protect the Congo's ethnic minorities (such as the Tutsis and Hutus) and quell negotiation. The talks were slated to be held on November 28, 2008.

However, even with peace talks progressing, World Vision stated that rape incidents had risen sharply, with 120 seventeen-and-under girls interviewed having been raped. The threat of children being used as soldiers had also increased, with World Vision advocacy director Sue Mbaya claiming that "A silent war has been waged against women and children."

On November 26, 2008, rebel forces engaged Mai-Mai militia near the towns of Kinyando and Kwwenda despite the ceasefire, sending civilians "fleeing along highways". The UN condemned this breach of the ceasefire while calling on the Congolese government to discipline government troops, who were caught looting the village of Bulotwa. Meanwhile, a crowd of 100,000 displaced persons gathered in the rebel-held town of Rutshuru, where the United Nations were distributing supplies and medicine, intended to help combat cholera, which was reported to be affecting hundreds of people, having spread through unsanitary refugee camps.

On November 29, 2008, Nkunda stated that unless the Congolese government entered into direct talks he would re-initiate the conflict. After meeting with UN special envoy Olusegun Obasanjo Nkunda stated that, "If there is no negotiation, let us say then there is war. I think the good way is negotiation. I know [the Congolese government army] have no capacity to fight so they have only one choice, negotiation." Obasanjo affirmed that the "course of peace [had] been advanced", with the Congolese government agreeing to talks but not where to hold them.

=== Government-belligerent talks ===
On December 8, 2008, the Congolese government sent representatives to Nairobi to negotiate with a potential collection of 20 armed groups, who had been invited to foster peace talks in hopes of ending the conflict and settling issues in what was praised as a brave "first step" towards peace. According to Congolese information minister Lambert Mende, "We want this to be an inclusive process. We don't want to leave anyone out." However, the main rebel group, Laurent Nkunda's CNDP rebels, declined to attend, as did Congolese President Joseph Kabila, as both were after bilateral talks. CNDP spokesman Bertrand Bisimwa stated that this was because the group had not been informed about the decision to invite other groups, including government-aligned militias; he affirmed the rebel decision to have one-on-one talks with the government, stating, "Our position is very clear. We will negotiate with the government and no one else. The government can negotiate with whomever it wants. But any attempt to impose Amani (previous peace talks) on us will fail."

Tensions later heightened as Nkunda's rebels announced that they would walk out on the talks if other groups were included, while pro-government Mai-Mai rebels stated they would pull out of negotiations if the CDNP got their own separate talks that were not under the banner of earlier "Amani" peace talks from January 2008 which aimed to unite all of the armed groups in the Congo in peace talks. "To proceed in this way is to incite us to quit the Amani programme, the government should not forget this", claimed Mai-Mai leaders. "We are not a negligible group, we have arms... We want the CNDP to rejoin Amani. It seems that by quitting Amani, they have become more important than the other groups. We don't understand the decision by the government to go and negotiate with the CNDP... We are disappointed, it's a flagrant violation of Amani's terms." CNDP spokesman Bertrand Bisimwa stated that the rebels "are going to Nairobi to discuss only with the government outside of the Amani programme... If the government insists on staying in Amani, we'll pack our bags." CNDP representatives, led by deputy executive secretary Serge Kambasu Ngeve, had arrived in the Kenyan capital city of Nairobi believing that they would be participating in bilateral discussions with the Congolese government alone. The government representatives, led by Congolese Minister for International and Regional Cooperation Raymond Tshibanda, did not express concern, with Information Minister Lambert Mende claiming that if the CNDP wanted to walk out "that's their problem not ours. It's their problem if they don't want peace. They'll be held accountable for their acts." Meanwhile, Alan Le Roy, Under-Secretary General for Peacekeeping Operations, pressed for more action to be taken to intervene in the situation.

A military solution is not an option. We appeal to your principles to make this dialogue a success. The eyes of the world are on you. Let us stop the haemorrhage and open a new chapter of durable peace and harmony. The current humanitarian crisis in North Kivu is a scar on the conscience of the world.

— United Nations Special Envoy Olusegun Obasanjo

On December 9, 2008, at 1230 (GMT) bilateral talks between the CNDP and Kinshasa government opened at the United Nations headquarters in the Kenyan capital city of Nairobi, mediated by UN envoy Olusegun Obasanjo; the respective leaders of the two groups, Laurent Nkunda and President Joseph Kabila, did not participate. Kenyan Foreign Minister Moses Wetangula issued a statement to the delegations telling them to "put aside your differences and realise that you have only one Congo, and that the international community is here with you to encourage and assist you. Please don't let Africa and your country down." The talks, chaired by President Mwai Kibaki and attended by former President of Tanzania Benjamin Mkapa, who represented the African Union, were referred to as "an opportunity that should neither be lost nor wasted" by Obasanjo, who stated that "A military solution is not an option. We appeal to your principles to make this dialogue a success." Obasanjo went on to declare that the talks should accomplish a permanent ceasefire in eastern Congo, continued reinforcement of a corridor for humanitarian assistance in the region, and a lasting peace in Congo; he also praised the delegations for their efforts. Wetangula added, "The pictures and clips we have been seeing on international TV screens remains a terrible indictment to all of us Africans, you Congolese in particular. I want you to be awake to the fact that the children, the women, the boys and girls that we see on TV every day may be your sons and daughters, may be your brothers and sisters, may be your parents. And it is for those that you are here to talk peace." Rebel spokesman Rene Abandi declared the rebels' intent to "talk quickly and go back home as quickly as possible, even though there are many issues to solve".

Meanwhile, the Chinese embassy in Kinshasa, Congo, offered to help mediate the talks, having sent envoy Guojin Liu to the region the previous day to discuss a peace deal, according to ambassador Wu Zexian.

At a meeting in Brussels, Belgium on December 9, 2008, European Union ministers remained divided over the issue of sending a "bridging force" of EU troops to stabilize the region until UN reinforcements could be deployed. Belgium expressed a desire to support UN troops deployed in the region. Secretary-General of the United Nations Ban Ki-moon had repeatedly expressed a desire earlier on to provide forces to fill the gap between UN reinforcements; the EU placed Foreign Policy chief Javier Solana and the European Commission in charge of preparing a response. Italian Minister of Foreign Affairs Franco Frattini said that while he it was too early to decide whether or not Italy could donate troops to an EU battle group Italy would be glad to discuss the option if called upon. He stated, "One point is very clear, Europe should be effective. We cannot stay as inactive as we are now." Solana declared that the EU would review the calls for reinforcements, but "that the situation on the ground is getting slightly better, and politically also". Aid groups criticized the indecision, with Oxfam Head of Office in Brussels Elise Ford reprieving the EU and claiming that "We have had a month of every possible excuse as to why Europe will not send forces to bolster U.N. peacekeepers. Without an adequate professional force supporting U.N. peacekeepers to provide a measure of security for the population, the killing, raping and looting will continue unabated. We cannot stand by and watch."

On December 10, 2008, after CNDP and Congolese government representatives had met, UN envoy Olusegun Obasanjo stated that "[both sides] have made progress in their talks" and that they would have future, substantive discussions, though no date or location was decided. The invitation to the other 20 rebel groups was still standing, according to Obasanjo, though none had shown up, allowing for bilateral talks, which were the only thing the CNDP would accept.

On December 11, 2008, talks were encountering "serious difficulties" according to Obasanjo, who said that the rebels' lack of authority was the cause. "Either they give the people they have sent here the delegation, the power to make decisions or they send people who they will give such power to", Obasanjo stated, referring to how the rebels' inability to make concrete decisions was stalling the talks. He also accused them of "trying to broaden the negotiations to cover the whole of the DRC". The delegation of the Congolese government was referred to as "more flexible" and "empowered to take decision[s]", saying that "we have seen them taking decisions on the ground".

At the same time, allegations had surfaced that both the Congolese and Rwandan governments were fighting a proxy war by funding respectively-sided rebel groups, which included supporting the recruitment of child soldiers, a war crime. The United Nations Security Council agreed with this on December 12, 2008. However, Rwandan Foreign Minister Rosemary Museminali denied this, saying that "We are not supporting CNDP. We are not sending forces, we are not sending arms", while Nkunda stated that rebels "would already be in Kinshasa" if they had Rwanda's support. In response to these allegations the Netherlands suspended their financial support for the Rwandan government, canceling a roughly US$4 million transfer by the end of 2008 and another $5.32 million in 2009. Dutch Minister of Development Cooperation Bert Koenders stated this was due to the "strong evidence" produced tying Rwanda to Congolese militants. However, the Dutch government would continue humanitarian aid support for Rwandan civilians.

The European Union sent Development and Aid Commissioner Louis Michel as a diplomatic envoy in the region to ask rebel leader Nkunda to ask his delegation to be 'flexible' during the peace talks due to Obasanjo's complaint of the rebel delegation being uncooperative. Michel declared that he had "urged some flexible proposals with Nkunda"; however, Nkunda reaffirmed that he still wanted direct talks with the Congolese president, saying that DR Congo's problems extended beyond its borders. "The problems we are dealing with are national problems so they have to be addressed nationally and not as problems of one part of the country", he said. Nkunda also contested the president's election, saying that "Legitimacy is not elections and elections are not a blank cheque for a government to do whatever it wants." Michel contested this, saying that "President Kabila is legitimately elected ... Those who want to contest that legitimacy have to wait until the next elections."

On December 12, 2008, peace talks which had stalled earlier on were said to be progressing smoothly, with Obasanjo stating that "... delegations engaged in both direct and proximity talks in an atmosphere of goodwill". According to a high-level delegation that met with rebel general Laurent Nkunda to discuss topics raised by negotiations, rebel command response was "positive". Due to Kenyan Jamhuri (Independence) Day celebrations the mediators, after consulting with both parties, decided to adjourn the talks and resume on the 17th of that month. A statement released by Obasanjo stated that he was "pleased to note that [the delegations] are making steady progress towards agreement on the ground rules for substantive discussions." The statement also covered the postponement due to the Kenyan national holiday; "In reverence for Kenya's Jamhuri Day celebrations on 12 December, the Mediators, in consultation with the parties, have decided to adjourn and resume the direct talks on 17 December 2008."

In the meantime, the Human Rights Watch reported that 150 people had been killed in a crossfire between Nkunda's rebels and Mai-Mai militia on November 5, 2008. The killings, described as a "summary execution", took place 800 m (1/2 mi) away from a MONUC peacekeeping force, leading to criticism of the peacekeepers for not keeping guard over the area. "Due to the importance of these two towns as centers for humanitarian assistance, MONUC considered them a priority protection zone, yet the peacekeepers did not protect the towns from a rebel takeover or halt the destruction of displacement camps. Nor did they stop the mass killing of civilians in Kiwanja where they had an important field base", said the group. Earlier death estimates were around 20, and had been explained by spokesman Alan Le Roy as a consequence of the lack of peacekeeping troops to cover the whole area, with 10 peacekeepers for every 10,000 civilians. Later at 0100 local time a shootout between government and rebel troops took place in displaced-persons camp Kibati, killing a five-year-old girl and severely injuring another 7-year-old one. According to UN spokesman Ron Redmond "It does not appear they were targeted." Earlier on December 11 a woman had been raped by armed men outside of the same camp. Said a UN statement, "We remain extremely concerned for the safety of the displaced Congolese population in Kibati as the civilian character of these two UNHCR-run camps north of Goma is continually violated." The UN has been working to relocate people sheltering in the troubled camp, according to the organization.

== CNDP internal conflict and split ==
On 6 January 2009 former CNDP militant Jean-Bosco Ntaganda and other officers of the rebel faction claimed that they had stripped Nkunda of his power, replacing him with Ntaganda as general. However, the CNDP's second-in-command, Colonel Makinga Sultani, immediately denied that this had occurred, with another spokesperson assuring that "the group is intact and its various organs are fully operational". However, the day after saw the CNDP decided on the consequences for Bosco Ntaganda, according to sources. Meanwhile, the rebels questioned the UN peacekeeping force's true intentions, with spokesman Bertrand Bisimwa asking, "What is this game being played by the Monuc? More precisely, what mischief are they up to?" He accused the group of sowing confusion in the Congolese governmental army-controlled demilitarized zones east of Kibati. MONUC had previously issued a statement in their defense on January 2, saying that, "Contrary to the accusations of the CNDP (...), the Monuc is doing its level best to protect civilian lives, to strengthen the legitimate institutions of the Democratic republic of Congo and to encourage national reconciliation." The rebels stated that they required verification of peacekeeping in the conflict zone to proceed with peace talks.

We declare the end of hostilities between CNDP forces and government troops.

— Dissident leader Bosco Ntaganda

On 17 January rebels led by former CNDP militant Jean-Bosco Ntaganda, a war criminal already indicted by the International Criminal Court, formally declared separation from Nkunda's group and agreed to join the Congolese government's army in an effort to increase pressure on the rebel general to declare a lasting ceasefire. The dissidents announced the creation of the splinter group at a meeting in Goma attended by nine of the CNDP's leading commanders. Also, the meeting was attended by the Rwandan Chief of staff, significant in the fact that Rwanda had often been accused of using the CNDP as a proxy in the Congo. Nkunda was not present. Sources said that the splintering did not affect conflict in the country, as sporadic firefights continued.

On January 21 MONUC and the Congolese government ran into disagreement again on the topic of the joint operation, coordinated by the Congolese army and Rwandan Defence Forces, that involved action against Rwandan FLDR rebels operating in the South Kivu province of the Congo. The Congolese and Rwandan forces barred press reporters and MONUC from interfering. As for Ntaganda's involvement, MONUC had no objection, which surprised some sources, given the ICC's ties to the UN.

However, MONUC took a negative stance on Ntaganda's involvement. On May 12, the organization's peacekeepers first stated that they would not work with the nation's army if Ntaganda, the army's recently appointed deputy coordinator, was a part of it; later, they would revise their claim and announce that they would not work on any operation involving the former war criminal. This negative sentiment was finally scaled down to the point where MONUC stated that they would not "sit down and take a photo with Bosco Ntaganda."

=== Capture of Nkunda ===
Nkunda was arrested on 22 January 2009 after he had crossed into Rwanda. After unsuccessfully attempting to defeat the CNDP militarily, Congolese president Kabila made a deal with President Kagame of Rwanda to allow Rwandan soldiers into the DRC to uproot FDLR militants in exchange for Rwanda removing Nkunda. A military spokesperson said he had been seized after sending three battalions to repel an advance by a joint Congolese-Rwandan force. The force was part of a joint Congolese-Rwandan operation which was launched to hunt Rwandan Hutu militiamen operating in DR Congo. Nkunda is currently being held at an undisclosed location in Rwanda.

=== Cease-fire ===
On March 23, 2009, the CNDP signed a peace treaty with the government, in which it agreed to become a political party in exchange for the release of its imprisoned members.

=== Joint Congolese-Rwandan operation against FDLR ===
Over the weekend of 9/10 May 2009 FDLR rebels were blamed for attacks on the villages of Ekingi and Busurungi in Congo's eastern South Kivu province. More than 90 people were killed at Ekingi, including 60 civilians and 30 government troops, and "dozens more" were said to be killed at Busurungi. The FDLR were blamed by the United Nations' Office for the Coordination of Humanitarian Affairs; the UN's peacekeeping force, MONUC, and the Congolese Army are investigating the attacks. The FDLR had attacked several other villages in the preceding weeks and clashes occurred between FDLR forces and the Congolese Army, during which government forces are reported to have lost men killed and wounded. The most recent attacks have forced a significant number of people from their homes in Busurungi to Hombo, 20 kilometres (12 mi) north.

Another offensive against the FDLR rebel group by Congo and Rwanda, this time with the UN's backing, was announced in early May. This drew derision from aid agencies such as Oxfam. Oxfam's DR Congo head Marcel Stoessel stated that, "Four months ago an offensive against the FDLR set in train a spiral of violence against civilians which has forced 250,000 to flee their homes and caused untold death and suffering that continues to this day", adding, "the UN needs to be aware of the full implications of continuing to support military action in the present circumstances."

The joint-operation is part of an ongoing UN-backed rapprochement between the Congolese government and Rwanda. According to news media, improved relations between the two countries would enable MONUC, the region's peacekeeping force, to leave. Also, Rwandan President Paul Kagame stated that, "I do not understand Nkunda to be the cause of the problem... The problem is much bigger than one individual." Rwanda had been reluctant to release Nkunda, who it had arrested in January, to the Congolese government, where Nkunda would face the death penalty.

== Efficiency of humanitarian and peacekeeping efforts ==
=== Peacekeeping ===
The 17,000-strong MONUC peacekeeping force was regarded as failing to protect civilians and halt the progress of the rebels, who captured multiple U.N. field bases. MONUC's head, Alan Doss, stated that the U.N. troops were "certainly stretched... there's only so much we can do." The European Union was in the midst of talks related to sending reinforcements. Despite the presence of UN peacekeepers approximately 250,000 people were displaced by the conflict, bringing the total displaced person count to 2 million. The forces were also stated to be ineffective in keeping civilians safe from the rebel and government forces. This was hoped to be improved by deploying reinforcements consisting of 3,000 peacekeepers.

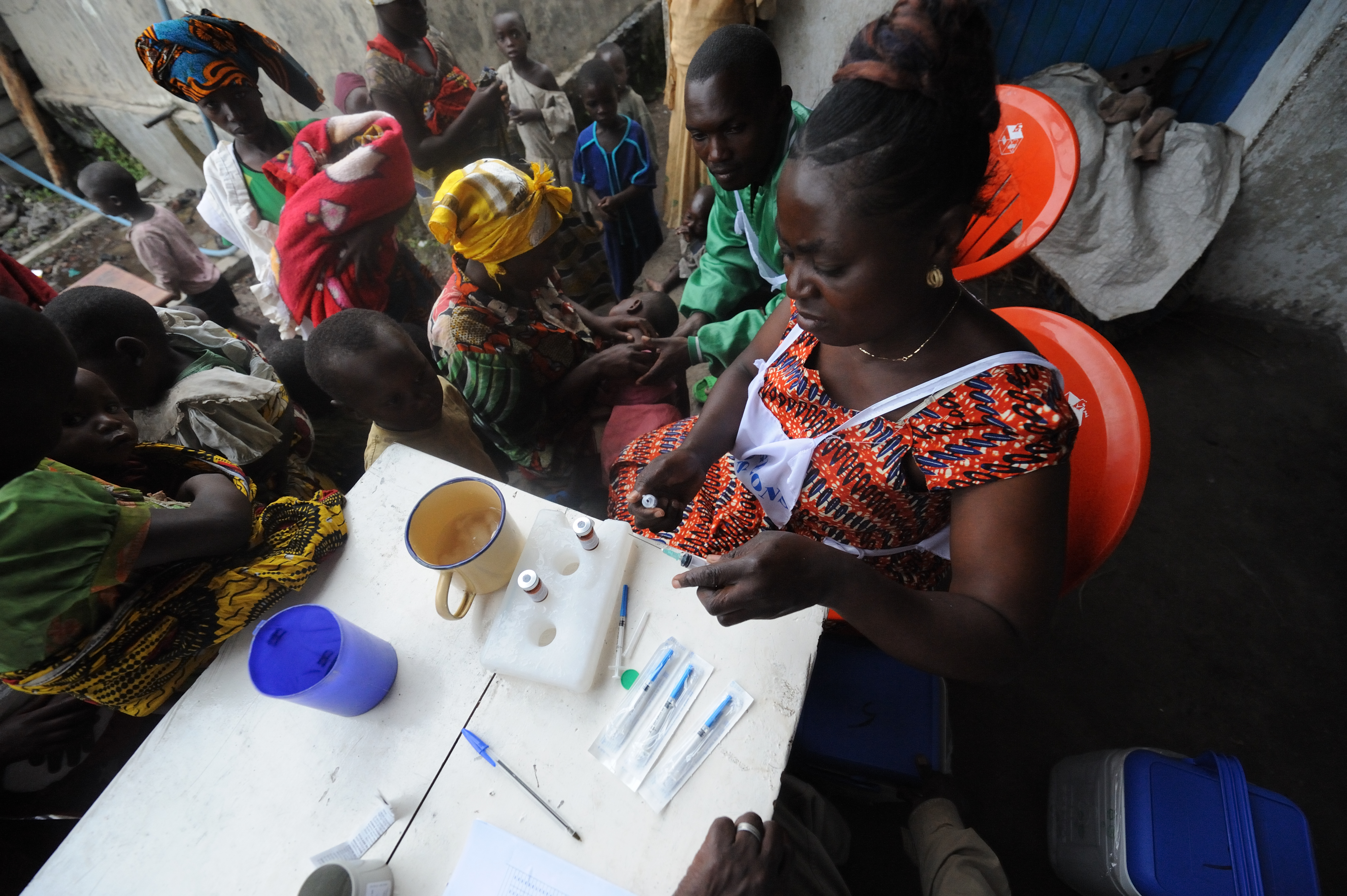
Refugees are vaccinated against measles and other infections.

The government's forces were criticized as well, with UN forces being stated to be protecting civilians from both rebels and Congolese troops. The soldiers were stated to be raping, looting, and were poorly fed, trained, paid and medicated; 11 soldiers were sentenced to life in prison for raping and looting while retreating from rebel forces. Another 12 faced court martial, with one allegedly having killed a family of 6 in Goma. They also were said to distrust armed forces commander, General Gabriel Amisi, due to his alliance with Nkunda during a 1998–2003 conflict.

On December 7, UN officials claimed that the $7.1 billion budget (USD) for peacekeeping troops was insufficient even before planned reinforcements of MONUC could be fulfilled; even the troop and equipment requirements may not be met, as Western countries declined support, citing the conflict not as "strategically vital" as those in Iraq and Afghanistan. International Crisis Group vice-president Fabienne Hara stated that, "Contributions of U.N. members states will probably not grow at the very least, if not diminish... [some missions] may not be funded properly due to a crisis in terms of resources." An anonymous UN official claimed that the Security Council could "drop the ball, move on to another issue and we're the ones at fault. We've seen before that is a recipe for failure." Reuters reported that a senior Western Security Council diplomat claimed that, while criticism was not invalid, other countries with reserves of troops should aid failing peacekeeping missions. The official stated that "We're not the only ones who can do this. Where are the Russians, the Ukrainians? Where are the developing countries who want to have seats on the Security Council? Where is Brazil? It doesn't always have to be us." The lack of peacekeeping resources was cited as counterproductive by political analyst Max Bergmann of the National Security Network. "UN forces ... do fail, but this is often the result of either too few troops or too little money. Our reliance on the United Nations to address trouble spots and to prevent them from worsening has only increased. Shorting the U.N. on peacekeeping funding is therefore akin to shooting ourselves in the foot." European Union nations declined to intervene.

The UN's foremost peacekeeping official, Under-Secretary General for Peacekeeping Operations Alan Le Roy, claimed that a "humanitarian tragedy" was unfolding in the Congo. Despite the organization's largest peacekeeping force being situated there, he claimed that "compared to the enormity of the tasks it is assigned and the vast expanse of the DRC – roughly the size of the United States east of the Mississippi and virtually without infrastructure – this number is actually rather small. Civilians have suffered from intense and often chaotic fighting, driven from their homes, caught in the crossfire and subjected to direct attacks and reprisals by armed groups and undisciplined elements of the national army. MONUC forces cannot serve as a substitute for the Congolese army to fight a war or impose peace; [the peacekeepers] are not an expeditionary or counterinsurgency force. With so much at stake, the international community simply cannot afford to let the Congo slide into the abyss, the time to act is, and indeed must be, now." Le Roy reaffirmed that more action should be taken until agreements could be reached by the opposing sides. At a conference on December 9 EU ministers remained divided on the issue of sending a "bridging force", citing the stabilizing situation.

On December 11, the Human Rights Watch found that 150 or more Congolese civilians had died at the hands of Congolese rebels in the town of Kiwanja. Earlier estimates had placed the death toll at 30. Mai-Mai militia, aligned with the government, had also "deliberately killed people". MONUC peacekeepers, who had been 800 m (1/2 mi) away at the time but had not been protecting it, were criticized for not supervising the town, which was one of several that had been taken over by rebel forces (another prominent one being the territorial capital of Rutshuru). The report stated that "Due to the importance of these two towns as centers for humanitarian assistance, MONUC considered them a priority protection zone, yet the peacekeepers did not protect the towns from a rebel takeover or halt the destruction of displacement camps. Nor did they stop the mass killing of civilians in Kiwanja where they had an important field base." HRW alleged that "following the Kiwanja killings, CNDP and Mai-Mai combatants continue to kill, rape, forcibly recruit children, and otherwise mistreat civilians in and around Kiwanja, the neighbouring town of Rutshuru, and in areas further north." Also, it reported another "18 deliberate killings in November and December perpetrated by the CNDP, the Mai-Mai and their allies", and received reports of "another 25 deaths, although ongoing insecurity has made it impossible to verify all such information."

On December 12, EU ministers remained divided on the issue of sending reinforcements; current president and French president Nicolas Sarkozy questioned the request, saying that it would be a better decision to draw troops from neighbouring countries instead of the distant EU. He declared, "It is not that from Europe we don't wish to participate, but ... isn't it better to draw on regional forces first of all, who are all pretty well ready to go?" Sarkozy cited the example of Angola, a regional power, who had earlier declared that they would support the Congolese government, and who the UN had alleged were already involved. Sarkozy also questioned the decision to reinforce MONUC peacekeepers, asking whether the extra 3,000 soldiers requested would be able to stop the conflict, saying "There are 17,000 UN soldiers in the Democratic Republic of Congo. It is the biggest ever operation and only 800 are doing a useful job. Why send another 3,000?" High Representative for the Common Foreign and Security Policy Javier Solana will meet with Secretary-General Ban Ki-moon on December 15 at the United Nations Headquarters to discuss the issue further. Sweden, Spain and Belgium were the only members of the 27-member committee to support the motion. Solana will also bring humanitarian, political and military proposals in front of the EU ministers to help bring peace and stability to the region. Solana's previous proposals included a separate EU military force, European troops in the region, and require troops to make roads and airports safe.

=== Refugee camps ===
The humanitarian effort was reported to be far underfunded, as thousands of refugees returned to rebel-held territory rather than stayed in the U.N.-governed camps. This was reported to be due to the lack of food, water and hygiene facilities.

The UN-operated World Food Programme began delivering hundreds of tons of food to the Congo on November 14, along with medical supplies and water purification kits. Congo Red Cross Secretary-General Jacques Katshitshi reported the situation as extremely impoverished, with "Displaced people [living] in extremely difficult conditions" and "a lack of food and water, and [terrible] hygiene conditions." He stated that cases of malnutrition had been reported even within UN refugee camps. The rations were said to cover approximately 50,000 people, providing them with one-month rations consisting of maize meal, peas, cooking oil and salt. The main obstacle to getting food to displaced persons was stated to be the upheaval in the region.

On November 20, the safety of internal refugee camps was called into question when gunmen, allegiance unknown, entered the Kibati camp, raped a girl, shot a 20-year-old woman to death, and looted nearby dwellings. The UN's High Commissioner for Refugees spokesman, Andrej Mahecic, said that the Congo situation was "extremely volatile", and did not know who the gunmen were working for, stating that "...we have seen both sides doing this." The High Commissioner for Refugees has repeatedly expressed concern over the safety of the 67,000 internally displaced persons in Kibati camps. According to Mahecic, "the fact that the camps are so close to the front lines is a huge cause of concern for us". This incident "adds more to the pressure to move these people as soon as possible".

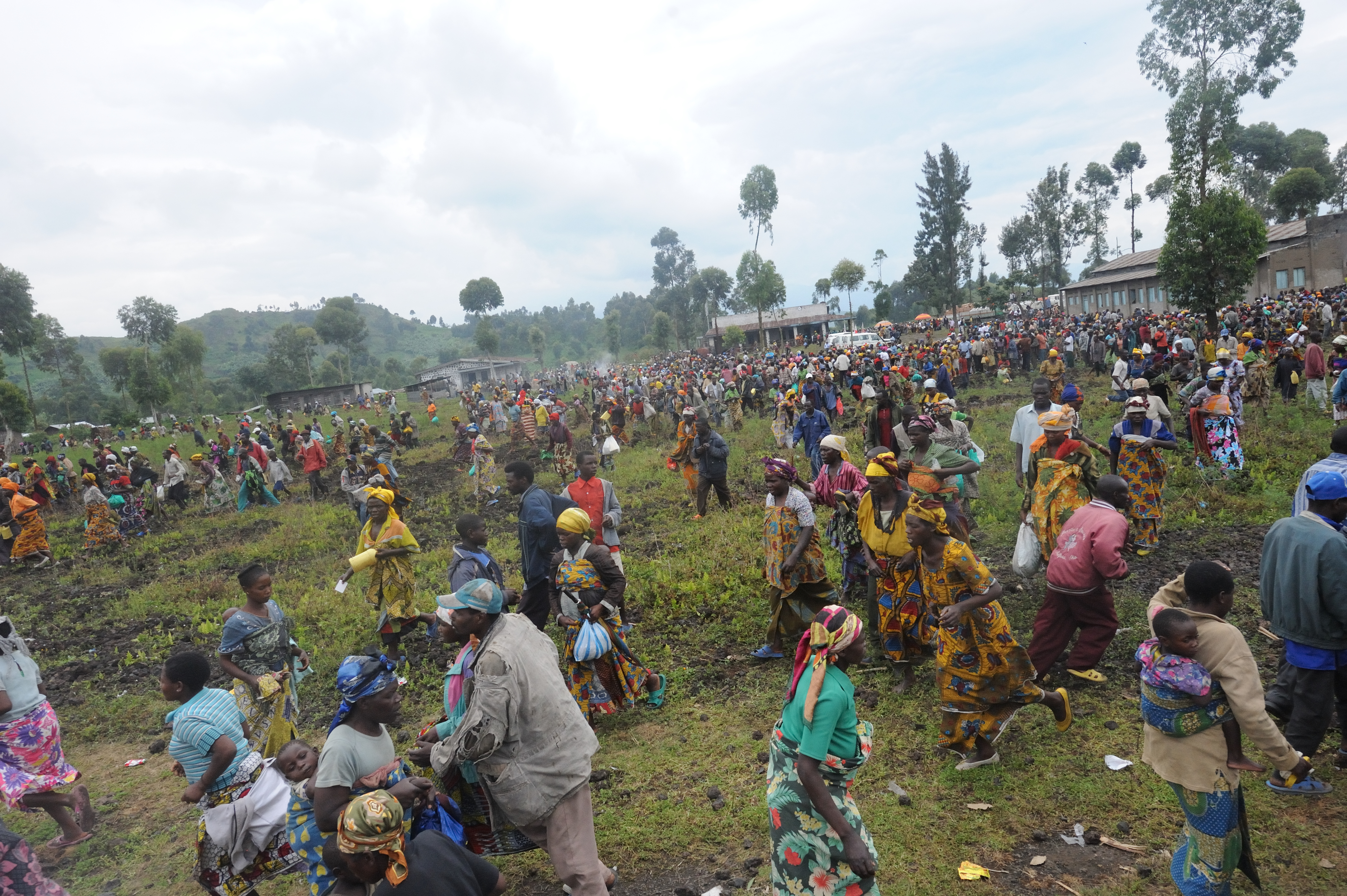
Masses of refugees scatter as shots are heard near the Kibati camp

As of December 10, Red Cross efforts had resulted in the reuniting of 15 families in the Congo, most who had separated from children in the confusion. Four radio stations were tasked with broadcasting the information of missing children, while Red Cross members posted pictures of lost children in displaced-person centers. The registered number of lost children was at 134, but according to the organization the number could be much higher.

On December 12, at 0100 local time, a firefight between government and rebel troops raged in the displaced-persons camp near Kibati. A five-year-old girl was killed in the crossfire, while a 7-year-old girl was severely injured. UN spokesman Ron Redmond stated that "It does not appear they were targeted." A woman had been raped by armed men outside of the same camp the previous day. The UN released a statement, saying that "We remain extremely concerned for the safety of the displaced Congolese population in Kibati as the civilian character of these two UNHCR-run camps north of Goma is continually violated." MONUC peacekeepers were said to be working on relocating internal refugees at the camp, according to the organization.

=== Wildlife ===
Animals have also felt the impact, with 200 of the world's 700 mountain gorillas living in a rebel-held park. A spokeswoman for the Virunga National Park, a UNESCO World Heritage Site, stated that the gorillas were "threatened" due to the gorillas' tendencies not to avoid gunfire or loud sounds, putting the nearly extinct animals at risk. Also, the inability of park rangers to get to the gorillas due to the rebel occupation was cited as dangerous, as the gorillas could not receive aid. On November 25, park rangers were allowed back into the park due to terms of the peace treaty, and plan to spend a month surveying the gorillas to assess their condition.

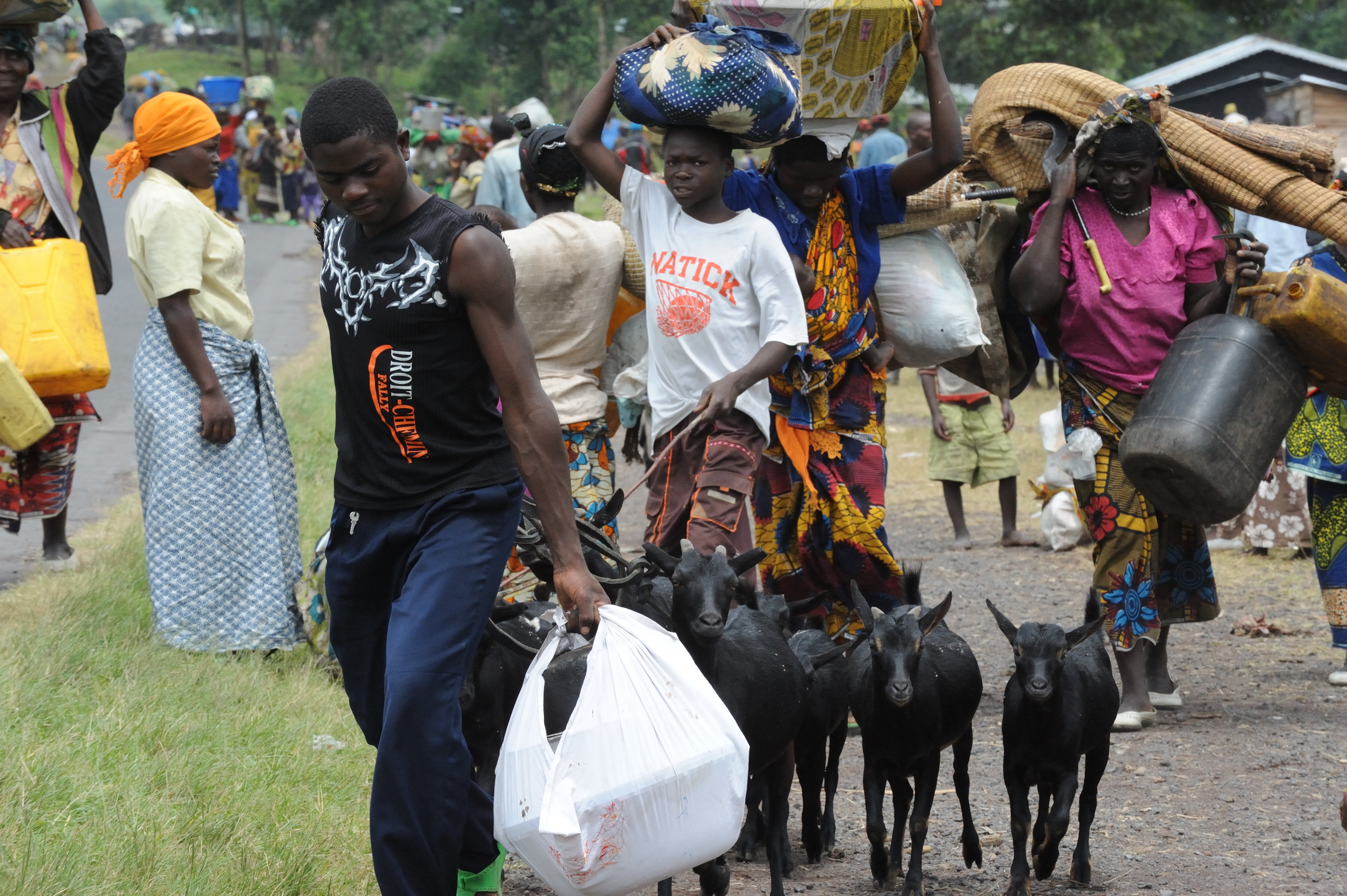
Refugees run as the Kibati camp comes under fire

=== Humanitarian aid corridor ===
On November 23, aid efforts improved as the planned humanitarian aid corridor opened and convoys were allowed access to several previously isolated cities to begin distributing supplies. Meanwhile, vendors in a local market in Goma were arrested for trying to sell UN food supplies compromising about 1% of the UN stockpile. World Food Programme spokeswoman Caroline Hutford stated that this was an expected outcome.

== Regional effects ==
Nkunda's motivations for the conflict were stated as a desire to protect Tutsi people from persecution by Hutus, some of whom had participated in killing Tutsis in the 1994 Rwandan genocide and had fled to the Democratic Republic of the Congo to be supported by the government. Nkunda's aspirations included fragmenting the Congo into ethnically divided states. As of November 4, 2008, tensions remained high as commentators speculated about the involvement of Rwanda, who is said to be affiliated to Nkunda by Congolese officials. Unofficial reports by civilians stated the presence of uniformed Rwandan soldiers fighting alongside rebel forces, though Rwanda officially denied these reports. The Congolese government, meanwhile, asked allied Angola to supply reinforcements in anticipation of Rwandan activity. The conflict has displaced almost a million people since it started, estimate some aid groups.

On November 27, 13,000 refugees were reported to have entered neighboring Uganda, fleeing the Congo situation from the Rutshuru district due to the alleged continuation of violence. As of December 9 this number had increased to over 30,000. According to United Nations spokeswoman for the United Nations High Commissioner for Refugees in Uganda, Roberta Russo, "Health, water and sanitation remain a major challenge in the camps."

Neighbouring locales, such as the town of Dungu in the Orientale Province, had also been struck by violence, with as many as 70,000 people estimated in need of help by the World Food Programme. Mustapha Darboe, the agency's regional director for East, Central and Southern Africa, claimed that "The suffering in Dungu has been overlooked as events further south in Goma and North Kivu have taken centre stage in recent weeks. Many thousands have been displaced and are living in fear of their children being abducted. Their situation could hardly be any worse." The UN had begun airlifting relief supplies in as of December 9.

== Casualties ==
While specific casualties have not been released, various sources have reported that an estimated 45,000 people die a month in the Congo, mostly of malnutrition and disease. Congo's monthly death rate of 2.2 deaths for each 1,000 people – essentially unchanged from the last survey in 2004 – is nearly 60 percent higher than the average for sub-Saharan Africa.

After the October 29 ceasefire, looting in Goma by Congolese soldiers was said to have caused at least 20 deaths and another 50 civilians were killed during the battle for Kiwanja. Death tolls as of November 7 were reported to be in the hundreds for civilians, though an estimated 1,400 die every day.

The Human Rights Watch stated that they had found at least 150 dead civilians in the town of Kiwanja who had been "summarily executed" by rebels. HRW reported in a statement that "following the Kiwanja killings, CNDP and Mai-Mai combatants continue to kill, rape, forcibly recruit children, and otherwise mistreat civilians in and around Kiwanja, the neighbouring town of Rutshuru, and in areas further north." Also, it reported another "18 deliberate killings in November and December perpetrated by the CNDP, the Mai-Mai and their allies", and received reports of "another 25 deaths, although ongoing insecurity has made it impossible to verify all such information."

=== War crimes ===
Speculation of war crimes began when a UN team reported the deaths of 26 non-combatants in the village of Kiwanja, said to have been killed by rebels working with government troops. Nkunda denied these claims, stating that the 'non-combatants' were Mai-Mai militia dressed in civilian clothing.

On November 19, child soldiers were confirmed to have been used by multiple factions, including rebel, government and militia forces. According to Save the Children spokesman George Graham 3,000 children were being used in various combat roles in the Congo; most were forced in by threats of bodily harm or harm to loved ones. UNICEF stated that the Congo was the "worst place in the world to be for a child".

On November 26 the United Nations began investigations on war crimes in the conflict, stating "alarming" evidence of "target killings and possibly massacres of civilians". This was raised by United Nations Secretary-General Ban Ki-moon in a report that recommended lengthening MONUC's mission through 2009, where it was originally supposed to end at the conclusion of 2008. According to DR Congo Special Representative Alan Doss MONUC had opened "several investigations into alleged massacres and extra-judicial executions", stating that "All belligerents have committed serious atrocities against civilians... Women and children have suffered most from the recurrent fighting. Sexual violence is rampant and many armed groups continue to recruit children into their ranks." The previous killing of 26 innocents in Kiwanja by rebels was a factor in the proposal. Ban also cited the International Criminal Court's warrant for the arrest of CNDP chief of staff Bosco Ntaganda, wanted for allegedly conscripting children into service in the Ituri region of eastern Congo in 2003.

On December 11, the Human Rights Watch reported that at least 150 civilians had been killed in the town of Kiwanja, where earlier estimates had placed the death toll at approximately 30. They reported that the majority of the dead civilians had been "summarily executed" by rebel troops. They also criticized MONUC peacekeepers, who had been 800 m (1/2 mi) away at the time of the incident but had not protected the town. The group stated that the practice was continuing, claiming that "following the Kiwanja killings, CNDP and Mai-Mai combatants continue to kill, rape, forcibly recruit children, and otherwise mistreat civilians in and around Kiwanja, the neighbouring town of Rutshuru, and in areas further north."

On December 12, a United Nations Security Council panel reported finding conclusive evidence of Rwandan government assistance in recruiting soldiers for rebel causes, including the recruitment of child soldiers. Amnesty International, meanwhile, stated that both the rebel and government sides had condoned rape in the conflict, and said that the failure to stop the crimes "suggests that, at the very least, they systematically condone the crime and thereby implicitly encourage its persistence on a mass scale". The organization said that some victims had been threatened with death if they asked for medical attention from others.

== External influences ==
- The UN claimed that Angolan troops were active in the conflict, though this was denied by Angola, who had stated it would support government troops if called upon.
- In May 2008 China lent the DRC approximately $9 billion USD to rebuild destroyed infrastructure and revitalize industry, along with a January investment of $35 million into the Congo's post office in the same year. Nkunda demanded these grants be reviewed, he said, "so that the Democratic Republic of Congo's mineral resources are not hypothecated and so that we can have a bright future."
- (Rwanda) Rwandan troops were reported to have been active in the conflict.
- (Zimbabwe) Zimbabwean troops were reportedly drawn into the conflict, supporting the government side at their request.

== Reactions ==
=== Government ===
- In response to allegations that Angola was involved in the war, the government of Angola denied, though they stated that they would support the government of DRC if called upon. However, according to UN officials, Angolan troops were in fact involved.
- (Belgium) Belgian foreign minister Karel De Gucht said the EU had "a moral responsibility".
- (Germany) German foreign minister Frank-Walter Steinmeier said that "There remain doubts among many member states whether a few 100 European soldiers will make a significant difference militarily", referring to the UN request of a European Union "bridging force" in the conflict.
- Rwanda supported Congolese rebel groups, according to the United Nations Security Council, though Rwanda itself denied this.
- (Netherlands) The Dutch canceled a planned $9.32 million (USD) transfer to the Rwandan government, citing Rwanda's ties to Congolese militants. However, they announced they would continue to send humanitarian support to Rwandan citizens.
- (Sweden) Swedish foreign minister Carl Bildt commented on the EU bridging force issue, stating that he did not expect a decision until 2009.
- The United States Department of State pushed for cooperation between Congo and the neighbouring countries of Rwanda and Uganda, stating that they "need to work together" to rein in "militia groups and other negative forces". Assistant Secretary of State for African Affairs Jendayi Frazer is scheduled to visit the region and urge talks. The Financial Times called on the United States and the UK to use their leverage over the Rwandan government to prevent a larger conflict.
- (Uganda) The Ugandan army expelled 35 Congolese policemen who had entered Ugandan territory with their weapons.
- United Nations Secretary-General Ban Ki-moon asked all involved parties "to make every effort to restore calm among the affected populations", due to concerns that the clash may spark widespread conflict.
- The UN declared the conflict "a humanitarian crisis of catastrophic dimensions".
- The World Food Programme stated that due to the displacement of approximately 200,000 in the region since August, malnourishment has risen and there were some cases of death due to starvation. According to a spokesman, the agency was short 33,000 tons of food if they were to last to March 2009, and needed US$46 million in donations to obtain it.

=== Civilian ===
- (Belgium) On Wednesday, November 12, Belgian protesters gathered outside the U.S. embassy protesting the U.S.'s support of both the Rwandan government and the government of the Democratic Republic of Congo.

=== Quotes ===
- "The world is failing in its responsibility to protect the Congo's innocent civilians... There has been an increase in incidents of forced labor, rape and widespread brutality, according to assessments carried out by international agency Oxfam over the past week, as armed men from all sides prey upon those who have sought 'sanctuary' from the fighting in North Kivu." — Juliette Prodhan, head of Congo Oxfam
- "Our concern is that it is going to take three months [for the United Nations] to get anybody on the ground. Our request is for the EU to send a bridging force. The EU has done this in the past for the Congo, and they have the capacity to get people on the ground within two weeks... the goal would be provide civilian protection, to do patrols and other things that would prevent looting, pillaging and raping by either the Congolese troops — which are doing this — or the rebel group." — Georgette Gagnon, executive director, African Human Rights Watch
- "We are going to liberate the people of Congo." — Rebel General Laurent Nkunda
- "The United States condemns and rejects the statements made by General Nkunda... The U.S. opposes all those who seek to foment instability in the Democratic Republic of the Congo." — Robert Wood, United States Department of State spokesman
- "What are they doing? They are supposed to protect us." — Jean-Paul Maombi, internal refugee, speaking about the retreating government troops
- "They are sending another 3,000 Blue Helmets and you are applauding. You are mistaken! We will not accept outsiders coming in to provide security for us here. Either you help us in the revolution or you keep quiet with MONUC. But if you wait for MONUC to bring you peace, you can wait forever." — Laurent Nkunda, rebel general
- "The forced displacement of populations and evidence of the targeted killings of civilians are alarming. In the current climate, the possibility of massacres of civilians cannot be ruled out." — Ban Ki-moon, Secretary-General of the United Nations
- "With so much at stake, the international community simply cannot afford to let the Congo slide into the abyss", he wrote. "The time to act is, and indeed must be, now." — Alan Le Roy, Under-Secretary General for Peacekeeping Operations
- "We have had a month of every possible excuse as to why Europe will not send forces to bolster U.N. peacekeepers. Without an adequate professional force supporting U.N. peacekeepers to provide a measure of security for the population, the killing, raping and looting will continue unabated. We cannot stand by and watch." — Elise Ford, Brussels Oxfam Head of Office
