= Algoma (placename) =

Algoma is a placename given to many different places throughout the United States and Canada. Examples include Algoma District, Ontario; Algoma, Oregon; Algoma, Wisconsin; and Algoma Township, Michigan. Algoma also lends its name to companies such as Algoma Steel and Algoma Central Railway.

== Word origin ==
The origin of the word Algoma is not entirely clear; the following are definitions culled from several different sources

- The word Algoma was invented as a placename by Henry Schoolcraft. Goma comes from the Algonquian suffix -gamaa for "lake", while Schoolcraft took the al- prefix from the word Algonquian. Henry Schoolcraft's original text, supports the idea that he invented this word:
  In the term Gitchegomee, the name for Superior, we have a specimen of their mode of making compounds. Gitche signifies something great, or possessing the property of positive magnitude. Gomee is itself a compound phrase, denoting, when so conjoined, a large body of water. It is the objective member of their term for the sea; but is governed by its antecedent, and may be used in describing other and minor, even the most minute liquid bodies, as we hear it, in the compound term mushkuagomee, i.e. strong drink. Under the government of the term gitchee, it appears to express simply the sense of great water, but conveys the idea, to the Indian mind, of sea-water. I have cast about, to find a sonorous form of elision, in which it may come into popular use, but find nothing more eligible than I-go-mee, or Igoma. A more practical word, in the shape of a new compound, may be made in Algoma, a term in which the first syllable of the generic name of this tribe of the Algonquin stock, harmonizes very well with the Indian idea of goma (sea), giving us, Sea of the Algonquins. The term may be objected to, as the result of a grammatical abbreviation, but if not adopted practically, it may do as a poetical synonym for this great lake. Such is, at least, the result of a full discussion of these names, with the very best speakers of the language.
  — Henry Schoolcraft,
- Another definition for the word states that Algoma actually comes from A'Goma (Potawatomi: Egema; Ojibwe: Agimaa) for "snow shoe".
- Yet another definition from the Algoma, Wisconsin Chamber of Commerce claims that Algoma is an Indian word meaning "park of flowers". Several web sites that provide meanings for the names of children and pets state that Algoma means "valley of flowers".
- The history of the town of Algoma, Mississippi contains a reference to Algoma as a Chickasaw word meaning "God abides" given as the name to the Algoma community by a Presbyterian preacher named Savage.

== Variations ==
The word Algona is frequently seen, substituting an n for an m. Various sources cite this as a corruption of Henry Schoolcraft's original word Algoma. Alcona itself is a placename used in the United States and Canada.
