= Algona =

Algona may refer to:

- Algona, Iowa, a city in Kossuth County, Iowa
- Algona, Washington, a city in King County, Washington
- Algona College, a former institution in Iowa (1869–1875)
- Algona Road, in Tasmania

== See also ==
- Algoma (disambiguation)
