= Ngoma =

Ngoma may refer to:

== Places ==
- Ngoma, Namibia, a settlement on the border between Namibia and Botswana
- Ngoma, Rulindo, Northern Province, Rwanda
- Ngoma, Uganda, a municipality in Nakaseke District
- Ngoma, Ukerewe, a ward in Ukerewe District, Tanzania
- Ngoma, Zambia, headquarters of Kafue National Park, Zambiq, and its airstrip:
  - Ngoma Airport
- Ngoma District, Rwanda district in East Province, centred on Kibungo

== Other things by the same name ==
- Ngoma (surname), a Congolese and Zambian surname
- Ngoma music about Ngoma music of Tanzania and the Great Lakes
- Ngoma (leafhopper), a leafhopper genus in the tribe Erythroneurini
- Ngoma (record label), an African local record company based in the Democratic Republic of the Congo
- Ngoma drums, used by certain Bantu populations of Africa
- Ngoma, an alternate term for the yuka (music) family of drums used in the music of Cuba
