= Jessie Jack Hooper House =

Historic house in Wisconsin, United States

- U.S. National Register of Historic Places
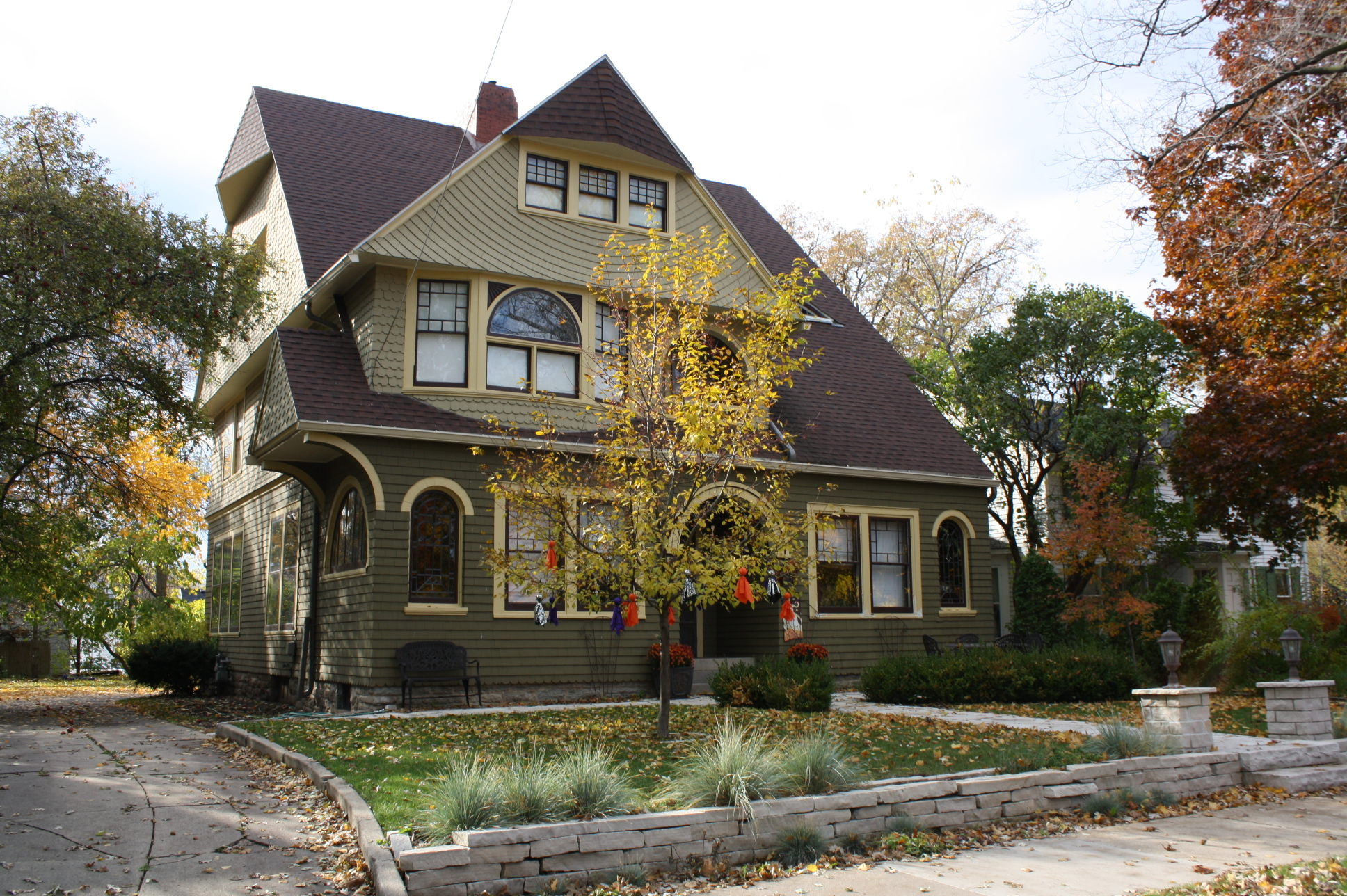
- Jessie Jack Hooper House
- Location: 1149 Algoma Blvd., Oshkosh, Wisconsin
- Coordinates: 44°01′52″N 88°33′20″W
- Area: 0.2 acres (0.081 ha)
- Built: 1888
- Architect: William Waters
- Architectural style: Shingle Style
- NRHP reference No.: 78000151
- Added to NRHP: December 18, 1978

The Jessie Jack Hooper House is located in Oshkosh, Wisconsin.

== History ==
Home of women's suffrage leader Jessie Jack Hooper. The house and matching coach house are Shingle style, designed by Waters and built in 1888. Her husband Benjamin was a lawyer for the sawmill. Jessie also organized women's war work during World War I, presided over the Wisconsin League of Women Voters in the 20s, and was involved in anti-war campaigns in the 30s.

The district was listed on the National Register of Historic Places in 1978 and on the State Register of Historic Places in 1989. It is located in the Algoma Boulevard Historic District.
