= Ngoma (surname) =

Ngoma is a Congolese and Zambian surname. Notable people with the name include:

- Angélique Ngoma, Gabonese politician
- Arthur Z'ahidi Ngoma (1947–2016), Congolese politician
- Aubrey Ngoma (born 1989), South African football player
- Becky Ngoma, Zambian actress and writer
- Brighton Ngoma (born 1985), South African actor
- Etienne Kassa-Ngoma (born 1962), Gabonese football player
- Fred Duval Ngoma (born 1997), Republic of the Congo football player
- Georges Ngoma-Nanitélamio (born 1978), Congolese football player
- Leonard Ngoma (born 1979), Zambian swimmer
- Nompumelelo Ngoma (born 1984), South African artist and printmaker
- Patrick Ngoma (born 1997), Zambian football player
- Serge Ngoma (born 2005), American football player
