= Alcona =

Alcona may refer to:

- Alcona, a railway flag stop in Sioux Lookout, Kenora District, Ontario, Canada
- Alcona, a community in Innisfil, Ontario, Canada
- Alcona Township, Township 5, Rooks County, Kansas, U.S.
  - Alcona, Kansas,
- Alcona County, Michigan, U.S.
  - Alcona Township, Michigan
  - Alcona, Michigan, an unincorporated community in Haynes Township

== See also ==
- Algoma (disambiguation)
- Alcona Dam
