= Algoma, Oregon =

Unincorporated community in the state of Oregon, United States

- Unincorporated community
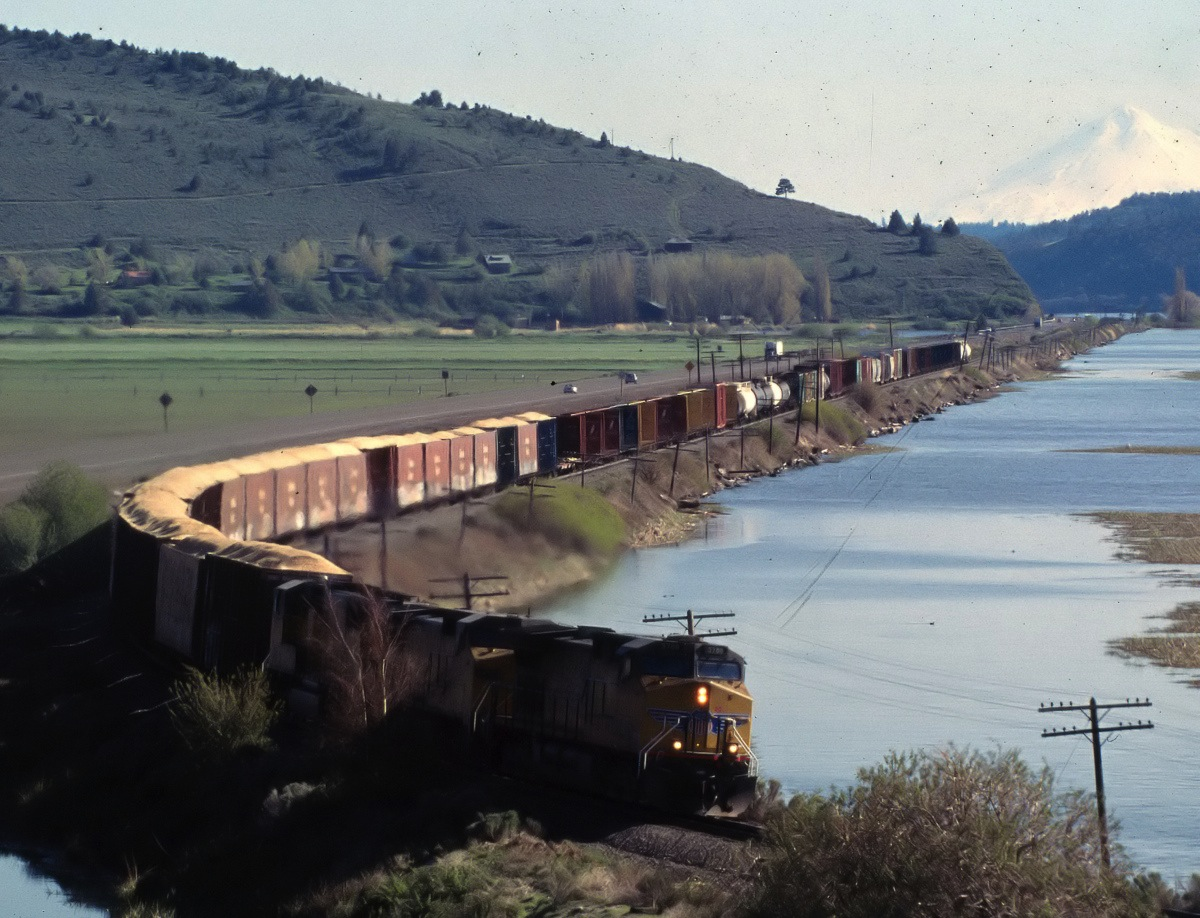
- Train passing by Algoma

- Location in Oregon Algoma, Oregon (the United States)
- Coordinates: 42°20′50″N 121°48′56″W
- Country: United States
- State: Oregon
- County: Klamath
- Elevation: 4,147 ft (1,264 m)
- Time zone: UTC-8 (Pacific)
  - Summer (DST): UTC-7 (Pacific)
- ZIP code: 97601
- Area codes: 458 and 541
- GNIS feature ID: 1135996

Algoma is an unincorporated community on the east shore of Upper Klamath Lake, in Klamath County, Oregon, United States. The community is approximately 8 miles (13 km) north of the city of Klamath Falls on U.S. Route 97. Algoma was named for the Algoma Lumber Company.

== History ==
In 1909, R. H. Hovey bought 10,000 acres (40 km^{2}) of timberland on the east shore of Upper Klamath Lake in Klamath County, Oregon. That was the beginning of the Algoma Lumber Company. In 1912, Hovey built a large sawmill with a capacity to mill 100,000 board-feet (236 m^{3}) of lumber per shift. Since the mill ran two shifts per day, the mill's daily production capacity was 200,000 board-feet (472 m^{3}). The company grew rapidly. By the end of its first year, the mill and its logging operations employed about 200 workers. To accommodate the workforce, the company platted the Algoma townsite.

Algoma post office opened in 1912. The town of Algoma had a population of 400 in 1919 and grew to 600 by 1931. In 1943, the post office closed. Today, Algoma is no longer recognized as a specific census data collection area so there is no current census information on the community.

== Company town ==
The Algoma townsite is located approximately 8 miles (13 km) north of Klamath Falls on Rattlesnake Point, on the shores of Upper Klamath Lake. It was established in 1912 to support the employees of the Algoma Lumber Company. The Algoma lumber mill was built on a 26-acre (0.11 km^{2}) site in Plum Valley near the southwest corner of Algoma Marsh, a 1,300-acre (5.3 km^{2}) meadowland between Barkley Springs to the north and Algoma Point to the south. The area is cut off from Upper Klamath Lake by a Union Pacific railroad embankment.

The Algoma Lumber Company logged all around Upper Klamath Lake. The company used a diesel-powered tugboat to tow log rafts to the mill site. The Algoma lumber mill's log pond was connected to the lake by a 20-foot (6.1 m) culvert that ran under the railroad embankment. Because of the shallow depth of the channel that connected the lake with the log pond, the company insisted that Upper Klamath Lake be maintained at a high level. The tugboat used by the Algoma Lumber Company was retired in 1943. Today, it is on display at the logging museum at Collier Memorial State Park, which is located 30 miles (48 km) north of Klamath Falls on U.S. Route 97.
