= Nompumelelo Ngoma =

Nompumelelo Ngoma (born 1984) is a visual artist and printmaker. Her work is in the permanent collection of the Smithsonian's National Museum of African Art.

In 2016, she received the Cassirer Welz Award.

== Biography ==
Ngoma was born in Soweto, Jabulani in South Africa.

Ngoma attended South West Gauteng College where she studied Fine Art. She completed a three-year printmaking program at the Artist Proof Studio and received an Honours degree in Visual Art from the University of Johannesburg in 2012.

Her monoprint, Take Care of Me, was purchased by the National Museum of African Art in 2014 and was featured in the museum's I Am...Contemporary Women Artists of Africa. Ngoma's first solo show was THULA MFAZI! at Circa Johannesburg in 2017. In 2021 Ngoma's work was included in North-West University (NWU) Gallery's online exhibit: Mantariana Mbokodo Musings focused on five South African women artists.

Ngoma lives and works in Johannesburg.
