= Alan Doss =

British civil servant

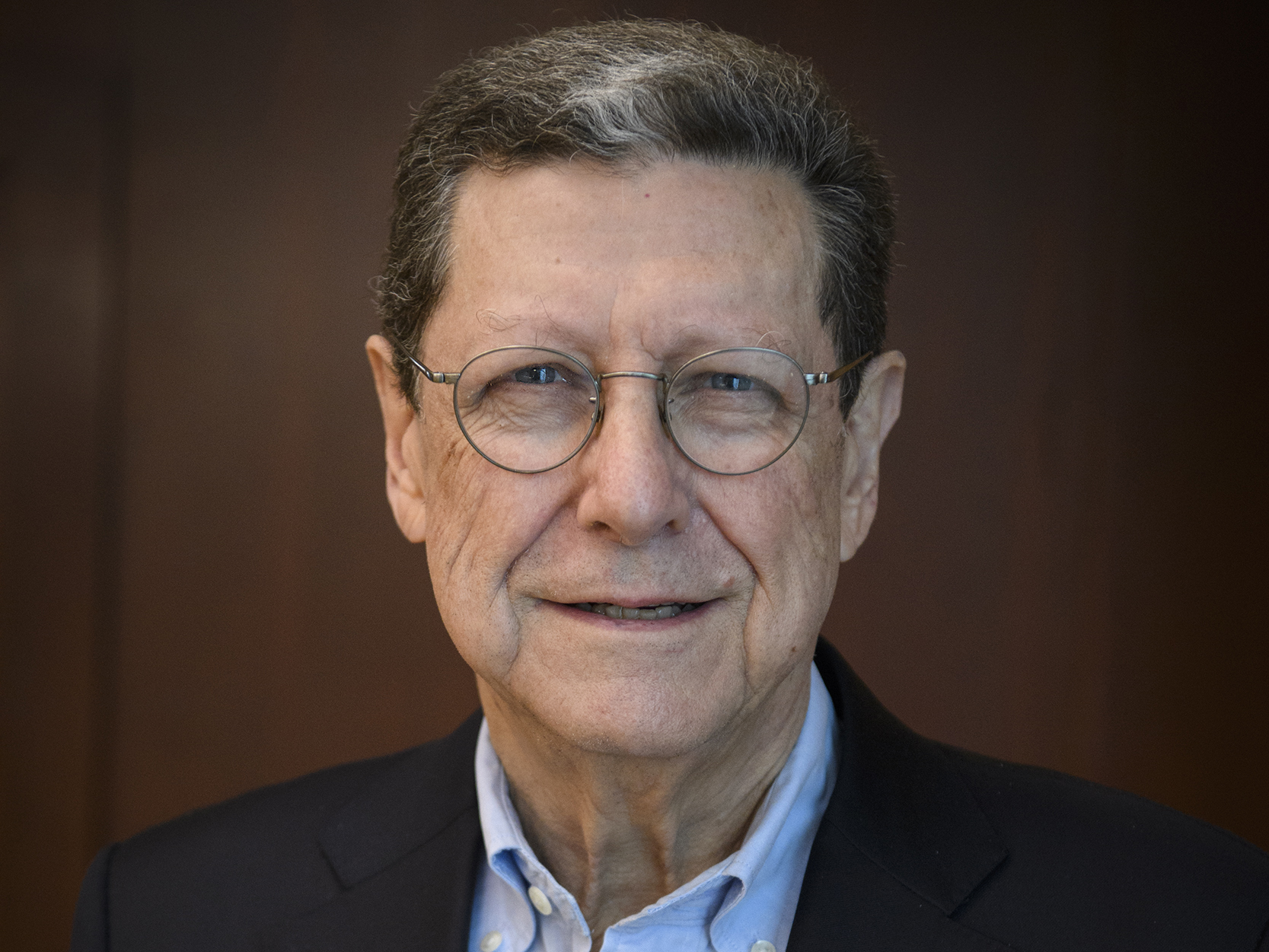
- Born: 7 January 1945 (age 81); United Kingdom
- Occupation: Civil servant

Alan Claude Doss (born 7 January 1945) is a British international civil servant who has spent his entire professional life in the service of the United Nations, working on peacekeeping, development and humanitarian assignments in Africa, Asia and Europe as well as at United Nations Headquarters in New York City.

== Early life ==
Doss grew up in Cardiff, Wales. He graduated from the London School of Economics and Political Science. He is married to Soheir Doss. They have three daughters and six granddaughters.

== Career at the United Nations ==
Alan Doss began his UN career in 1966 in Kenya working for the United Nations Development Programme (UNDP), the first of several assignments in Africa. Later appointments included posts as the UN Resident Coordinator and UNDP Resident Representative in Benin and the Democratic Republic of the Congo coordinating UN operational activities in those countries.

In 1977, he joined the Asia Bureau at UNDP headquarters and developed the first UNDP co-operation program for Vietnam. In 1979, he was appointed as Deputy Resident Representative of UNDP in China on the opening of the first international development co-operation programme and office in that country.

Doss then served as United Nations Resident Coordinator and Regional Representative of the UNDP in Bangkok, Thailand. At the same time, he was Director of the United Nations Border Relief Operation (UNBRO), in charge of United Nations assistance to hundreds of thousands of displaced Cambodians on the Thai-Cambodia border. During this period he was also the UN representative to the Mekong River Committee that manages South East Asia's greatest river network and was part of the negotiating team that restructured the institution into an inter-governmental commission with the re-admission of Cambodia to the group.

He was then appointed Director of the UNDP European Office in Geneva, Switzerland, where he was charged with strengthening UNDP's outreach and fund raising work in Western Europe, focusing on advocacy for human development. He concurrently represented the UNDP at the Development Assistance Committee (DAC) of the Organisation for Economic Co-operation and Development (OECD) in Paris where he was member of the group that drew up the DAC's landmark study on conflict, peace and development co-operation in 1997.

Doss subsequently held the position of Director of the United Nations Development Group (UNDG), which was set up by Secretary General Kofi Annan to strengthen co-ordination among the UN organisations dealing with development under the leadership of the Administrator of UNDP. He worked on the design and implementation of reforms aimed to improve the performance of UN operational activities around the world. During that period he coordinated the UNDG's work on the follow-up to the UN global conferences of the nineties, which led to the pioneer publication "A Better World for All" published jointly by the UN, World Bank, IMF and OECD and subsequently, at the end of the decade, to the UN's Millennium Development Goals.

In late 2000, Doss joined the UN peacekeeping mission in Sierra Leone, (UNAMSIL), as Deputy Special Representative of the UN Secretary General while serving concurrently as United Nations Humanitarian Coordinator and UNDP Resident Representative, His appointment, following on the recommendations of the Brahimi Panel on UN peace operations in late 2000, was aimed at strengthening the effectiveness of such operations through better co-ordination of UN peace keeping, humanitarian and development activities in country.

During this period he oversaw the reintegration of war affected populations, UN support for the disarmament program, the restoration of state authority, governance reform and the national recovery programme. In 2004 Doss became the Principal Deputy UN Special Representative of the Secretary-General for Ivory Coast, where he coordinated the work of the United Nations Peacekeeping Mission ONUCI in the areas of human rights, rule of law, civilian police and management.

Following on his assignment to Côte d'Ivoire, Doss was named as the Special Representative of the Secretary General of the United Nations in Liberia (UNMIL) and head of the UN peace keeping mission with the rank of Under Secretary General. The UN mission provided extensive security and political support for the 2005 national elections in Liberia, which resulted in the election of Ellen Johnson Sirleaf as Africa's first female elected head of state. Following the elections Doss worked very closely with the new Administration on national recovery and reconstruction including the groundbreaking governance and economic programme (GEMAP). During this time, he worked closely with the UN Special Court for Sierra Leone l to ensure that Charles Taylor, the former leader of Liberia was detained and transferred by to the Court's jurisdiction to face charges of war crimes and crimes against humanity.

On 24 October 2007, Doss was appointed as Special Representative of the Secretary General (SRSG) of the United Nations in the Democratic Republic of the Congo and Head of the UN peace keeping mission there (MONUC), again with the rank of Under Secretary General. MONUC (now MONUSCO), was the UN's largest peace operation at that time. The UN Mission was (and remains) supports the peace process in the Congo as it seeks to end armed conflict in the war ravaged eastern part of the country. The Mission is promoting human rights, the protection of women and children, reform of state institutions and the holding of democratic elections.

== Later career ==
Following his retirement from the United Nations in 2010, Doss joined the Geneva Centre for Security Policy (GCSP) as a Visiting and then Associate Fellow where he lectured and published on peacekeeping, peace building and leadership.

He was appointed Companion of the Order of St Michael and St George (CMG) in the 2011 New Year Honours for services to the United Nations.

He was a member of the Governing Board of Interpeace and the UN Institute for Training and Research’s I.Peace Advisory Board.

== The Kofi Annan Foundation ==
In October 2011, Alan Doss was appointed by Kofi Annan as Senior Political Advisor to set up a peace and security unit at his Foundation based in Geneva. The Foundation is an independent, non profit organisation that works to promote better global governance and strengthen the capacities of people and countries to achieve a fairer, more peaceful and resilient world.

In September 2014, Alan Doss was appointed Executive Director of the Kofi Annan Foundation, where his "outstanding experience in peace operations, development cooperation and humanitarian action gives him a unique perspective that will serve the Foundation well".

In March 2018, Alan Doss was appointed by Kofi Annan as President of the Foundation. Alan Doss stepped down from the executive leadership of the Kofi Annan Foundation in June 2020 and was succeeded by Corinne Momal-Vanian. He is now Senior Adviser to the Foundation.

After leaving the Kofi Annan Foundation, Doss has chaired the Advisory Board of the Oxford Global Society (OXGS) and is a founding member of Diplomats without Borders (DWB).

== Publications ==
- Eyewitness: Crisis, Contention and Coherence - Reflections from the Field: International Peacekeeping Vol 14, No 2 April 2007.
- Ending an endless Congo war: Washington Times July, 2008.
- The 2009 Nelson Mandela Africa lecture at the Royal United Services Institute.
- Peacebuilding in Practice: A Personal Perspective on Liberia and the DRC: in Victory Among People: Lessons from Countering Insurgency and Stabilising Fragile States; ed: Greg Mills and David Richards, Royal United Services Institution and the Brenthurst Foundation, 2011.
- After the Fall: Leaders, Leadership, and the Challenges of Post–Conflict Peacebuilding: Geneva Centre for Security Policy Paper #17, June 2011.
- Great Expectations: UN Peacekeeping, Civilian Protection, and the Use of Force: Geneva Centre for Security Policy, Research Series, 2011.
- Peace Operations and the Humanitarian Space: How can the Military and Civilians Cooperate in Protecting Civilians? International Forum for the Challenges of Peace Operations, Geneva Centre for Security Policy and the Swiss Confederation, 2012.
- A Life in Trouble: A Personal Reflection on Managing Crises: Britain and the World, Edinburgh University Press, Volume 5, 2012.
- Foreword: A New Deal? Development and Security in a Changing World: Jeremy Allouche and Jeremy Lind, Institute of Development Studies, UK, 2013.
- Truth and Consequences: Alan Doss and David Tolbert, Project Syndicate, July 11, 2014.
- In the Footsteps of Dr Bunche: The Congo, UN Peacekeeping and the Use of Force: Journal of Strategic Studies 37(5), July 2014.
- United Nations Organization Mission in the Democratic Republic of Congo (MONUC) and United Nations Organization Stabilization Mission in the Democratic Republic of Congo (MONUSCO):The Oxford Handbook of United Nations Peacekeeping Operations, October, 2014.
- Kofi Annan’s Unfinished Green Revolution: Project Syndicate September 5, 2018.
- “Reflections on the 100th anniversary of the armistice that ended WWI”, Alan Doss and Scott Weber, Le Monde, 9 November 2018.
- Mo Ibrahim and Alan Doss: “A Defeat for Democracy” -Guardian and Le Monde, February 2019.
- Alan Doss and Faizel Ismail: “Defending democracy: Nelson Mandela and Kofi Annan’s ideals under the spotlight” - The Daily Maverick, South Africa, 5 September 2019.
- “How can liberal democracies Best Manage China’s Re-emergence as a Great Power?” - The South China Morning Post, 4 November 2019.
- Preventing covid from killing democracy in Africa. Alan Doss and Mo Ibrahim. The Economist June 17th 2020.
- Safeguarding Democracy in West Africa. Africa Center for Strategic Studies, September 2020.
- A Peacekeeper in Africa: Learning from UN Interventions in Other People's Wars. Lynne Rienner Publishers, 2020.
- A Letter to the USA: Why Your Vote on Nov. 3 Matters for the World. PassBlue, New York, October 27, 2020.
- See also other Alan Doss articles on Peace, Conflict and Development in PassBlue.
- Episode 19: Book Talk - Alan Doss on A Peacekeeper in Africa: Learning from UN Interventions in Other People’s Wars.
- IPI Global Observatory: Reflections on UN Peacekeeping: Q&A with Alan Doss, 25 February 2020.
- Alan Doss on Diplomacy and Politics in United Nations Peacekeeping, International Peace Institute, February 10, 2020.
- Africa and the Soldiers of Misfortune, African Arguments, May 10, 2022
- Burma’s Struggle for the Future, Oxford Global Society, June 2022
- Engaging with Political Elites and Non-State Armed Groups in The Political Economy of Civil War and UN Peace Operations. Eds. Berdal and Sherman, Routledge, 2023
- Out of Step: The West’s Waltz with Africa, Oxford Global Society, May 2023
- Building a Vision for the Future from the Tunnels of the Past, PassBlue, August 20, 2024
- A Peacekeepers Lament , International Center for Dialogue Initiatives, February 2024
- Does Democracy Deliver Development, OXGS Podcast with Prof Brian Wong, July 2025
- What Prospects for Peace in Gaza? Diplomacy Now, December 2025
