= Algoma Boulevard Historic District =

Historic district in Wisconsin, United States

- U.S. National Register of Historic Places
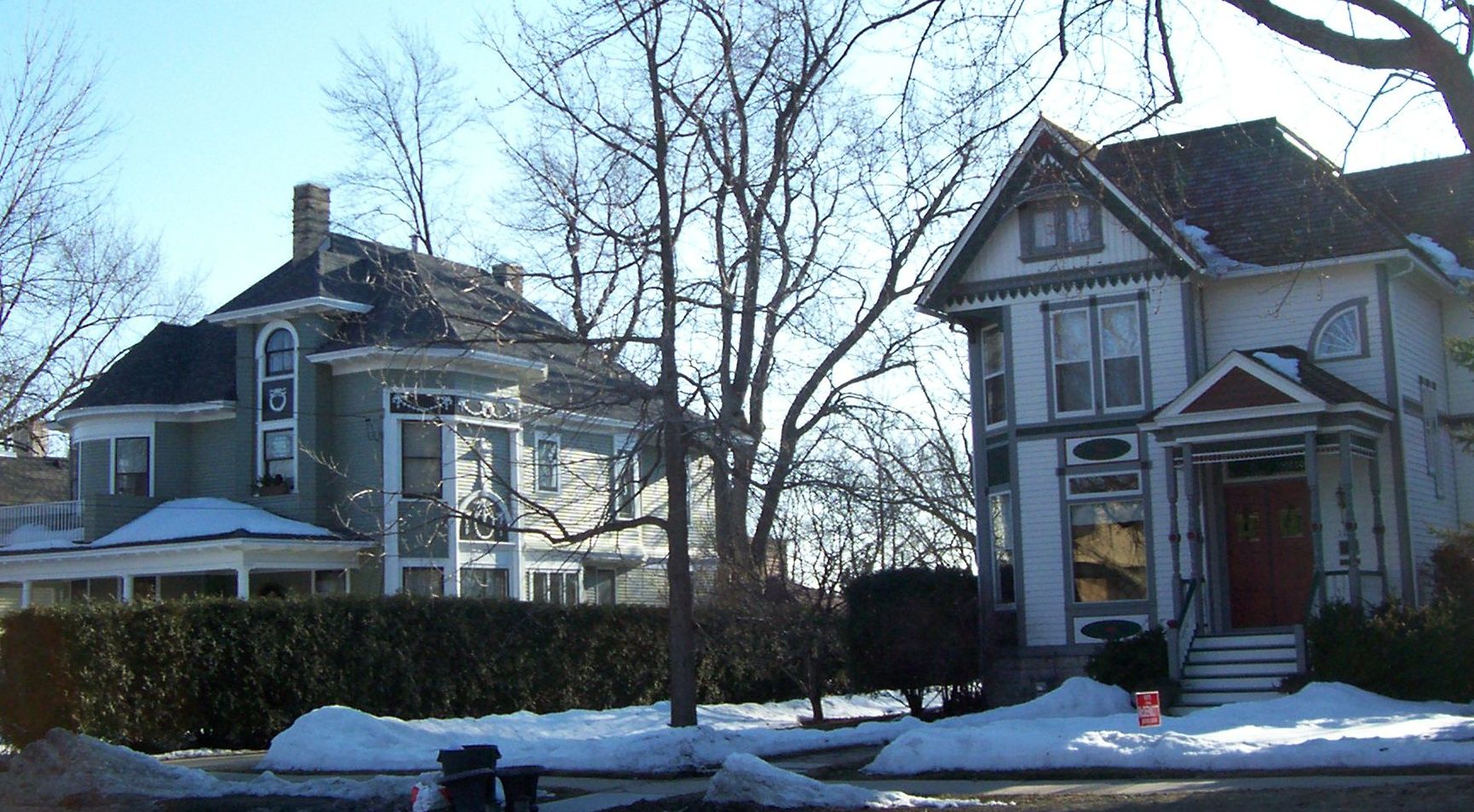
- A portion of the district.
- Location: Roughly, Algoma Blvd. from Woodland Ave. to Hollister Ave., Oshkosh, Wisconsin
- Area: 42 acres (17 ha)
- NRHP reference No.: 94001368
- Added to NRHP: December 1, 1994

The Algoma Boulevard Historic District is located in Oshkosh, Wisconsin.

== History ==
The district features a string of large, elaborate homes, once known as the "Gold Coast" of Oshkosh. Many were built by lumber barons and officers of their companies. Notable examples of different styles are the 1857 Greek Revival Kohlmann house, the 1868 Italianate Anthes house, the 1888 Queen Anne Charles Wood house, the 1897 Shingle-style Ideson-Osborn house, the 1911 Richardsonian Romanesque Moses Hooper house, the 1908 Tudor Revival Sawyer house, the 1911 Colonial Revival Schriber house, the 1917 Wright-designed Prairie Style Hunt house, and the 1926 Mediterranean Revival Converse house. A number of houses in the district were designed by noted architect William Waters, among them being the Jessie Jack Hooper House.

The district was added to both the State and the National Register of Historic Places in 1994.
