= Anneke Van Woudenberg =

British activist

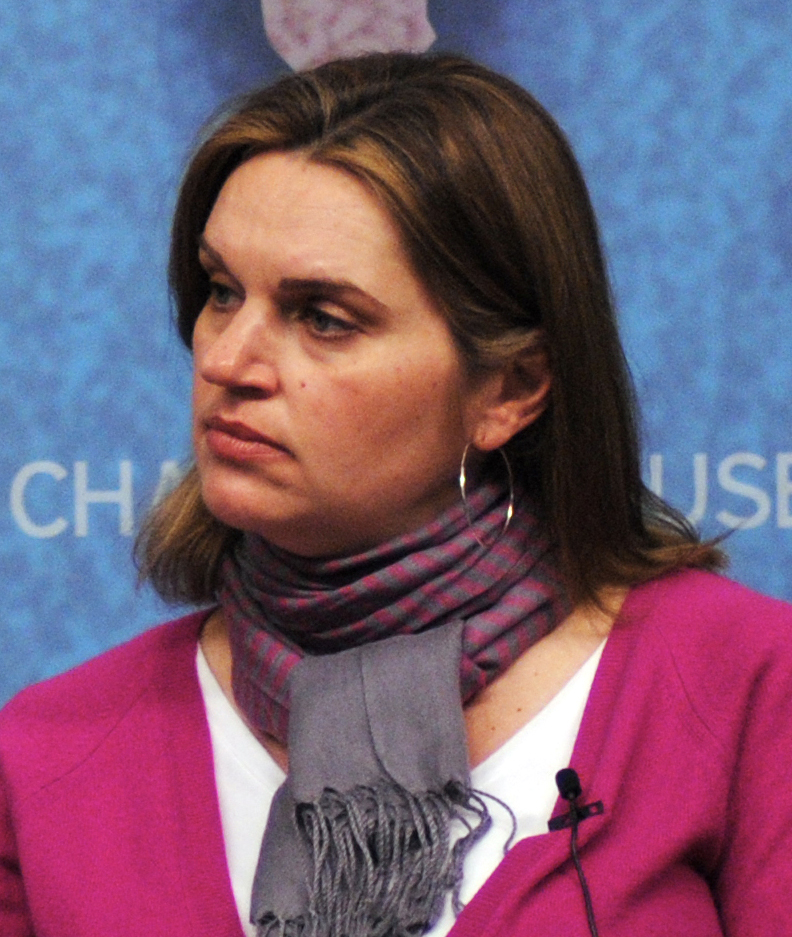
- Van Woudenberg in February 2013
- Education: London School of Economics
- Occupation: Executive Director
- Employer(s): Rights & Accountability in Development (RAID)

Anneke Van Woudenberg is the executive director of UK corporate watchdog Rights & Accountability in Development (RAID), which seeks to hold companies to account for human rights abuses and environmental harm. Previously she was the Deputy Director for Africa at Human Rights Watch. She joined Human Rights Watch in 2002, where she focused on humanitarian and human rights issues in the Great Lakes region of Africa, especially in the Democratic Republic of Congo (DRC). She has authored numerous human rights reports and regularly presents briefings to the United Nations Security Council, the British and European Parliaments, and the United States Congress.

Van Woudenberg has testified at numerous war crimes trials including at the International Criminal Court in The Hague, where she testified against Congolese warlord Bosco Ntaganda.

Van Woudenberg frequently appears in the international media, providing commentary on corporate accountability and human rights, and has appeared on the American television show 60 Minutes.

Van Woudenberg worked as a researcher for the British and Canadian parliaments then entered the private sector for six years, working at Andersen Consulting and large multinational banks.

Between 1999 and 2002, she also worked for Oxfam GB as Country Director in DR Congo.

Van Woudenberg attended the London School of Economics where she received her master's degree in international relations.
