= Algoma Boulevard United Methodist Church =

Historic church in Wisconsin, United States

- Algoma Boulevard Methodist Church
- U.S. National Register of Historic Places
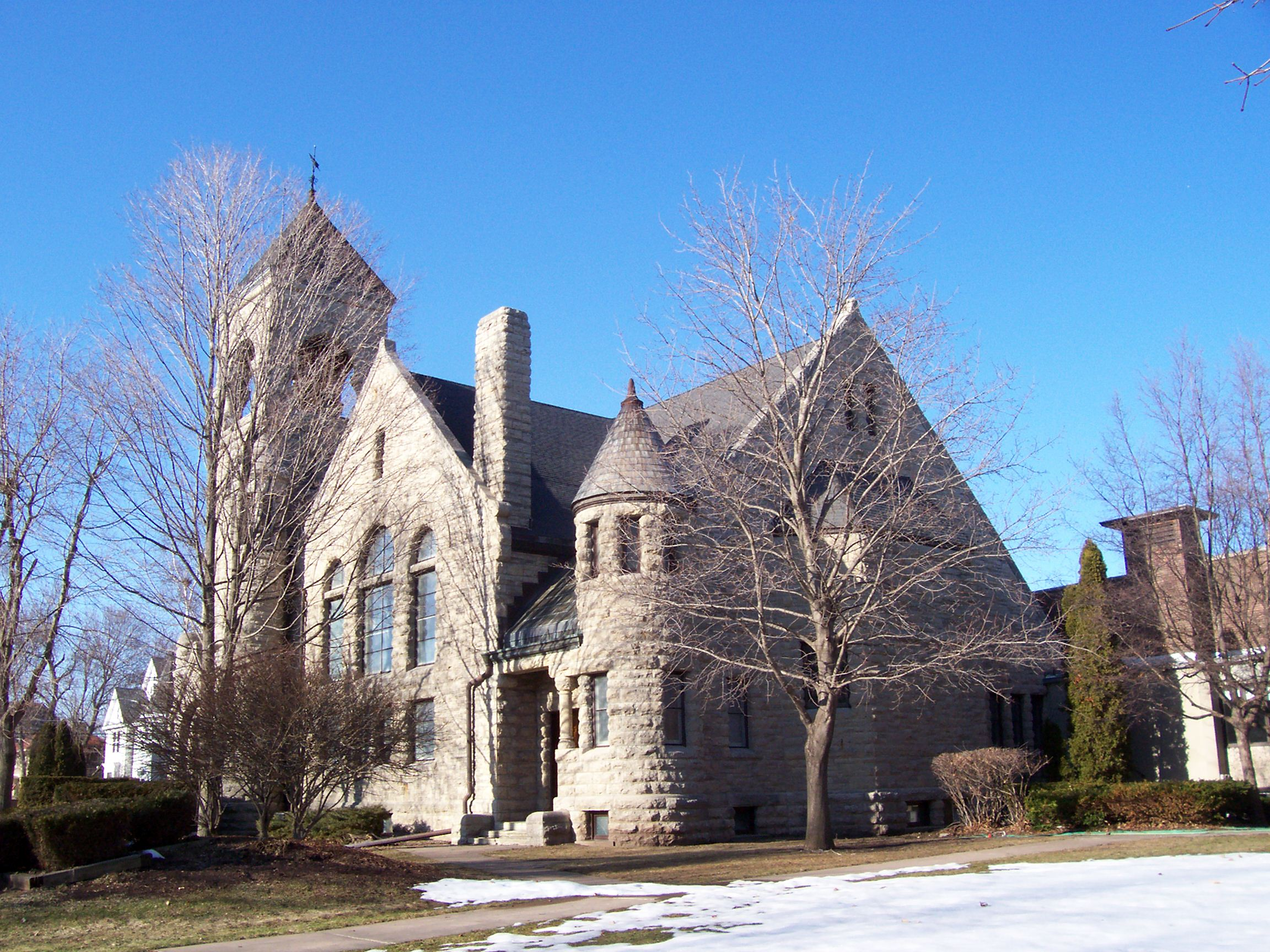

- Location within Wisconsin Location within the United States
- Location: 1174 Algoma Blvd., Oshkosh, Wisconsin
- Coordinates: 44°1′55″N 88°33′19″W
- Area: less than one acre
- Built: 1890
- Architect: William Waters
- Architectural style: Richardsonian Romanesque
- NRHP reference No.: 74000140
- Added to NRHP: December 3, 1974

Algoma Boulevard United Methodist Church is a historic Methodist church in Oshkosh, Wisconsin, United States. The congregation was founded in 1870. Its building was built in 1890 and it was added to the National Register of Historic Places in 1974.

The church was designed by prominent Wisconsin architect William Waters (1843–1917).
