= 2026 United States gubernatorial elections =

- November 3, 2026

39 governorships 36 states; 3 territories
	Majority party	Minority party
Party	Democratic	Republican
Seats before	24	26
Seats after	30	20
Seat change	▲6	▼6
Seats up	18	18
Seats won	24	12
- Democratic hold Democratic gain Republican hold Republican gain TBD in runoff No election

Gubernatorial elections were held in the United States on November 3, 2026. These elections took place in 36 states and three territories. The governorships up for election in 2026 were split evenly - 18 Republicans and 18 Democrats. Democrats won 24 of them, while Republicans won 12, as the Democrats achieved turn-overs in Alaska, Georgia, Iowa, Nevada, Ohio and Texas. Republicans successfully defended two governorships in states that Kamala Harris won in 2024 (New Hampshire and Vermont), while Democrats successfully defended five governorships up for election in states that Donald Trump won in 2024 (Arizona, Kansas, Michigan, Pennsylvania, and Wisconsin).

The previous gubernatorial elections for this group of states took place in 2022, except in New Hampshire and Vermont, where governors serve two-year terms and elected their governors in 2024.

Fifteen of the thirty-six states and two of the three United States territories with elections in this cycle had officially term-limited incumbents.

The Democrats flipped six state governorships, while the Republicans flipped two in the territories of Guam and the Northern Mariana Islands. As a result, this was the first time since 2009 where Democrats won a majority of governorships. At 30 governorships after these elections, this represents the most for the Democrats since 1992. Democrats will govern three-quarters of the United States population, a jump from 57 percent prior to the elections.

== Partisan composition ==
Going into the election, there were 26 Republican governors and 24 Democratic governors in the United States. The governorships up for election in 2026 were split evenly – 18 Republicans and 18 Democrats. Republicans held two governorships up for election in states that Kamala Harris won in 2024 (New Hampshire and Vermont), while Democrats held five governorships up for election in states that Donald Trump won in 2024 (Arizona, Kansas, Michigan, Pennsylvania, and Wisconsin).

== Retirements ==
Map of retirements: Republican incumbent ran Democratic incumbent ran Republican incumbent term-limited or retired Democratic incumbent term-limited, retired, or lost renomination Independent incumbent retired No election

There were 22 incumbent governors (11 Democrats, 10 Republicans, and one Independent) who retired, of which 17 incumbent governors (eight Democrats and nine Republicans) were term-limited. The remaining five incumbent governors (three Democrats, one Republican, and one Independent) did not seek reelection.

=== Democratic ===
1. California: Gavin Newsom was term-limited after 2 terms.
2. Colorado: Jared Polis was term-limited after 2 terms.
3. District of Columbia: Muriel Bowser retired.
4. Guam: Lou Leon Guerrero was term-limited after 2 terms.
5. Kansas: Laura Kelly was term-limited after 2 terms.
6. Maine: Janet Mills was term-limited after 2 terms.
7. Michigan: Gretchen Whitmer was term-limited after 2 terms.
8. Minnesota: Tim Walz retired.
9. New Mexico: Michelle Lujan Grisham was term-limited after 2 terms.
10. United States Virgin Islands: Albert Bryan Jr. was term-limited after 2 terms.
11. Wisconsin: Tony Evers retired.

=== Republican ===
1. Alabama: Kay Ivey was term-limited after 2 full terms.
2. Alaska: Mike Dunleavy was term-limited after 2 terms.
3. Florida: Ron DeSantis was term-limited after 2 terms.
4. Georgia: Brian Kemp was term-limited after 2 terms.
5. Iowa: Kim Reynolds retired.
6. Ohio: Mike DeWine was term-limited after 2 terms.
7. Oklahoma: Kevin Stitt was term-limited after 2 terms.
8. South Carolina: Henry McMaster was term-limited after 2 full terms.
9. Tennessee: Bill Lee was term-limited after 2 terms.
10. Wyoming: Mark Gordon was term-limited after 2 terms.

=== Independents ===
1. Northern Mariana Islands: David M. Apatang retired.

== Incumbents defeated ==
=== In primary elections ===
==== Democrats ====
One Democrat lost renomination. The last elected incumbent governor to lose renomination was Neil Abercrombie of Hawaii in 2014. (Note: Jeff Colyer, who succeeded Sam Brownback as Governor of Kansas in 2017 and finished out Brownback's term, ran for a full term in 2018 but lost the primary to Kris Kobach, who lost the general election to Laura Kelly.)

1. Rhode Island: Dan McKee lost renomination to Helena Foulkes.

=== In general elections ===
==== Republicans ====
Two Republicans lost reelection.

1. Nevada: Joe Lombardo lost reelection to Aaron Ford.
2. Texas: Greg Abbott lost reelection to Gina Hinojosa.

== Predictions ==
Several sites and individuals published predictions of competitive seats. These predictions looked at factors such as the strength of the incumbent (if the incumbent was running for reelection) and the other candidates, and the state's partisan lean (reflected in part by the state's Cook Partisan Voting Index rating). The predictions assigned ratings to each seat, indicating the predicted advantage that a party had in winning that seat. Most election predictors used:

- "tossup": no advantage
- "tilt" (used by some predictors): advantage that is not quite as strong as "lean"
- "lean": slight advantage
- "likely": significant, but surmountable, advantage
- "safe" or "solid": near-certain chance of victory

Constituency		Incumbent		Ratings								Result
State	PVI	Governor	Last election (Note: The last elections for this group of governors, with the exception of New Hampshire and Vermont, were in 2022, except for those who became governors after their predecessor's resignation.)	Cook Oct. 29, 2026	DDHQ Nov. 3, 2026	Fox Nov. 1, 2026	IE Oct. 29, 2026	NBC Nov. 3, 2026	RCP Nov. 1, 2026	Sabato Nov. 2, 2026	Silver Nov. 3, 2026	Result
Alabama	R+15	Kay Ivey (term-limited)	66.91% R	Solid R	Likely R	Solid R	Solid R	Solid R	Solid R	Likely R	Solid R	Tuberville
Alaska	R+6	Mike Dunleavy (term-limited)	50.29% R	Lean D (flip)	Lean D (flip)	Tossup	Tilt D (flip)	Lean D (flip)	Lean D (flip)	Likely D (flip)	Likely D (flip)	Kreiss-Tomkins (flip)
Arizona	R+2	Katie Hobbs	50.32% D	Likely D	Likely D	Lean D	Tilt D	Likely D	Lean D	Likely D	Solid D	Hobbs
Arkansas	R+15	Sarah Huckabee Sanders	62.96% R	Solid R	Safe R	Solid R	Solid R	Solid R	Solid R	Safe R	Solid R	Huckabee Sanders
California	D+12	Gavin Newsom (term-limited)	59.18% D	Solid D	Safe D	Solid D	Solid D	Solid D	Solid D	Safe D	Solid D	Becerra
Colorado	D+6	Jared Polis (term-limited)	58.53% D	Solid D	Likely D	Solid D	Solid D	Solid D	Solid D	Safe D	Solid D	Weiser
Connecticut	D+8	Ned Lamont	55.97% D	Solid D	Likely D	Solid D	Solid D	Solid D	Solid D	Safe D	Solid D	Lamont
Florida	R+5	Ron DeSantis (term-limited)	59.37% R	Lean R	Lean R	Lean R	Lean R	Lean R	Tossup	Lean R	Likely R	Donalds
Georgia	R+1	Brian Kemp (term-limited)	53.41% R	Tossup	Lean D (flip)	Tossup	Tilt D (flip)	Tossup	Tossup	Lean D (flip)	Lean D (flip)	Lance Bottoms (flip)
Hawaii	D+13	Josh Green	63.21% D	Solid D	Safe D	Solid D	Solid D	Solid D	Solid D	Safe D	Solid D	Green
Idaho	R+18	Brad Little	60.52% R	Solid R	Safe R	Solid R	Solid R	Solid R	Solid R	Safe R	Solid R	Little
Illinois	D+6	JB Pritzker	54.91% D	Solid D	Safe D	Solid D	Solid D	Solid D	Solid D	Safe D	Solid D	Pritzker
Iowa	R+6	Kim Reynolds (retiring)	58.04% R	Lean D (flip)	Lean D (flip)	Lean D (flip)	Lean D (flip)	Lean D (flip)	Lean D (flip)	Lean D (flip)	Likely D (flip)	Sand (flip)
Kansas	R+8	Laura Kelly (term-limited)	49.54% D	Tossup	Lean R (flip)	Lean R (flip)	Tilt R (flip)	Lean R (flip)	Tossup	Lean R (flip)	Tossup	Holscher
Maine	D+4	Janet Mills (term-limited)	55.69% D	Solid D	Likely D	Solid D	Solid D	Solid D	Likely D	Likely D	Solid D	Pingree
Maryland	D+15	Wes Moore	64.53% D	Solid D	Safe D	Solid D	Solid D	Solid D	Solid D	Safe D	Solid D	Moore
Massachusetts	D+14	Maura Healey	63.74% D	Solid D	Safe D	Solid D	Solid D	Solid D	Solid D	Safe D	Solid D	Healey
Michigan	EVEN	Gretchen Whitmer (term-limited)	54.47% D	Lean D	Likely D	Lean D	Lean D	Lean D	Lean D	Likely D	Solid D	Benson
Minnesota	D+3	Tim Walz (retiring)	52.27% DFL	Solid D	Likely D	Likely D	Likely D	Solid D	Likely D	Safe D	Solid D	Klobuchar
Nebraska	R+10	Jim Pillen	59.74% R	Lean R	Likely R	Likely R	Likely R	Lean R	Solid R	Likely R	Likely R	Pillen
Nevada	R+1	Joe Lombardo	48.81% R	Tossup	Tossup	Tossup	Tossup	Tossup	Tossup	Lean D (flip)	Tossup	Ford (flip)
New Hampshire	D+2	Kelly Ayotte	53.64% R	Likely R	Lean R	Likely R	Solid R	Likely R	Lean R	Lean R	Likely R	Ayotte
New Mexico	D+4	Michelle Lujan Grisham (term-limited)	51.97% D	Solid D	Likely D	Solid D	Likely D	Solid D	Lean D	Safe D	Solid D	Haaland
New York	D+8	Kathy Hochul	53.12% D	Solid D	Likely D	Solid D	Likely D	Solid D	Solid D	Safe D	Solid D	Hochul
Ohio	R+5	Mike DeWine (term-limited)	62.41% R	Lean D (flip)	Lean D (flip)	Lean D (flip)	Tilt D (flip)	Lean D (flip)	Tossup	Lean D (flip)	Likely D (flip)	Acton (flip)
Oklahoma	R+17	Kevin Stitt (term-limited)	55.45% R	Likely R	Safe R	Solid R	Likely R	Likely R	Solid R	Likely R	Likely R	Mazzei
Oregon	D+8	Tina Kotek	46.96% D	Lean D	Likely D	Lean D	Tilt D	Likely D	Tossup	Lean D	Likely D	Kotek
Pennsylvania	R+1	Josh Shapiro	56.49% D	Solid D	Safe D	Solid D	Solid D	Solid D	Solid D	Safe D	Solid D	Shapiro
Rhode Island	D+8	Dan McKee (lost renomination)	57.92% D	Solid D	Safe D	Solid D	Solid D	Solid D	Solid D	Safe D	Solid D	Foulkes
South Carolina	R+8	Henry McMaster (term-limited)	58.04% R	Solid R	Likely R	Solid R	Solid R	Solid R	Likely R	Safe R	Solid R	Wilson
South Dakota	R+15	Larry Rhoden	61.98% R	Solid R	Safe R	Solid R	Solid R	Solid R	Solid R	Safe R	Solid R	Rhoden
Tennessee	R+14	Bill Lee (term-limited)	64.91% R	Solid R	Likely R	Solid R	Likely R	Solid R	Solid R	Safe R	Solid R	Blackburn
Texas	R+6	Greg Abbott	54.76% R	Lean R	Lean R	Lean R	Tilt R	Lean R	Tossup	Lean R	Lean R	Hinojosa (flip)
Vermont	D+17	Phil Scott	73.43% R	Likely R	Likely R	Likely R	Likely R	Likely R	Tossup	Lean R	Tossup	Scott
Wisconsin	EVEN	Tony Evers (retiring)	51.15% D	Lean D	Lean D	Tossup	Tilt D	Lean D	Tossup	Lean D	Likely D	Crowley
Wyoming	R+23	Mark Gordon (term-limited)	74.07% R	Solid R	Safe R	Solid R	Solid R	Solid R	Solid R	Safe R	Solid R	Barlow
Overall				D - 26; R - 21; 3 tossups	D - 27; R - 22; 1 tossup	D - 24; R - 22; 4 tossups	D - 27; R - 22; 1 tossup	D - 26; R - 22; 2 tossups	D - 23; R - 18; 9 tossups	D - 28; R - 22	D - 27; R - 20; 3 tossups	D - 30; R - 20

== Closest races ==
States where the margin of victory was under 5%:

1. Kansas, 1.03%
2. Florida, 1.29%
3. Tennessee, 2.57%
4. Guam, 3.30%
5. Alabama, 4.00%
6. New Hampshire, 4.28%
7. South Carolina, 4.45%

States where the margin of victory was under 10%:

1. Oklahoma, 6.00%
2. Vermont, 6.60%
3. Texas, 7.14%
4. Nevada, 7.56%
5. Nebraska, 7.88%
6. Ohio, 7.92%
7. Wisconsin, 8.00%
8. Georgia, 8.68%
9. Oregon, 9.60%

Blue denotes races won by Democrats. Red denotes races won by Republicans.

== Race summary ==
=== States ===
State	Previous Governor	Previous Party	First elected	Status	Candidates
Alabama	Kay Ivey	Republican	2017 (Note: Ivey took office after her predecessor, Robert J. Bentley, resigned. She was subsequently elected in 2018.)	Incumbent term-limited. Republican hold.	▌ ✓ Tommy Tuberville (Republican) 52.0%; ▌Doug Jones (Democratic) 48.0%
Alaska	Mike Dunleavy	Republican	2018	Incumbent term-limited. Democratic gain.	▌ ✓ Jonathan Kreiss-Tomkins (Democratic) 50.2%; ▌Bernadette Wilson (Republican) 28.7%; ▌Dave Bronson (Republican) 13.8%; ▌Treg Taylor (Republican) 7.3%
Arizona	Katie Hobbs	Democratic	2022	Incumbent re-elected.	▌ ✓ Katie Hobbs (Democratic) 55.4%; ▌Andy Biggs (Republican) 42.8%; ▌Risa Lombardo (Green) 0.9%; ▌Teri Hourihan (No Labels) 0.9%
Arkansas	Sarah Huckabee Sanders	Republican	2022	Incumbent re-elected.	▌ ✓ Sarah Huckabee Sanders (Republican) 53.9%; ▌Fredrick Love (Democratic) 38.6%; ▌Colt Shelby (Libertarian) 7.6%
California	Gavin Newsom	Democratic	2018	Incumbent term-limited. Democratic hold.	▌ ✓ Xavier Becerra (Democratic) 64.6%; ▌Steve Hilton (Republican) 35.4%
Colorado	Jared Polis	Democratic	2018	Incumbent term-limited. Democratic hold.	▌ ✓ Phil Weiser (Democratic) 60.8%; ▌Victor Marx (Republican) 33.5%; Others: ▌Greg Lopez (Independent) 2.8%; ▌Eric Mulder (Libertarian) 1.6%; ▌Stephen Hamilton (American Constitution) 0.6%; ▌Erik Underwood (Approval Voting) 0.3%; ▌Jeff Peckman (Unity) 0.2%
Connecticut	Ned Lamont	Democratic	2018	Incumbent re-elected.	▌ ✓ Ned Lamont (Democratic) 59.3%; ▌Ryan Fazio (Republican) 40.7%
Florida	Ron DeSantis	Republican	2018	Incumbent term-limited. Republican hold.	▌ ✓ Byron Donalds (Republican) 50.0%; ▌David Jolly (Democratic) 48.7%; Others: ▌Scott Jewett (Libertarian) 0.5%; ▌Frank Russo (Independent) 0.3%; ▌Charles Burkett (Independent) 0.2%; ▌Dean Abrams (Independent) 0.2%; ▌Jeffrey Datto (Independent) 0.1%; ▌Moe Dimanche (Independent) 0.1%
Georgia	Brian Kemp	Republican	2018	Incumbent term-limited. Democratic gain.	▌ ✓ Keisha Lance Bottoms (Democratic) 54.3%; ▌Rick Jackson (Republican) 45.7%
Hawaii	Josh Green	Democratic	2022	Incumbent re-elected.	▌ ✓ Josh Green (Democratic) 71.2%; ▌Gary Cordery (Republican) 26.8%
Idaho	Brad Little	Republican	2018	Incumbent re-elected.	▌ ✓ Brad Little (Republican) 57.1%; ▌Terri Pickens (Democratic) 32.3%; ▌John Stegner (Independent) 7.6%; ▌Paul Sand (Libertarian) 1.6%; ▌Pro-Life (Constitution) 1.3%
Illinois	JB Pritzker	Democratic	2018	Incumbent re-elected.	▌ ✓ JB Pritzker (Democratic) 59.8%; ▌Darren Bailey (Republican) 36.8%; ▌Collin Corbett (Independent) 3.4%
Iowa	Kim Reynolds	Republican	2017 (Note: Reynolds took office after her predecessor, Terry Branstad, resigned. She was subsequently elected in 2018.)	Incumbent retiring. Democratic gain.	▌ ✓ Rob Sand (Democratic) 55.5%; ▌Zach Lahn (Republican) 44.5%
Kansas	Laura Kelly	Democratic	2018	Incumbent term-limited. Democratic hold.	▌ ✓ Cindy Holscher (Democratic) 50.3%; ▌Ty Masterson (Republican) 49.7%
Maine	Janet Mills	Democratic	2018	Incumbent term-limited. Democratic hold.	▌ ✓ Hannah Pingree (Democratic) 54.5%; ▌Robert B. Charles (Republican) 37.4%; ▌Rick Bennett (Independent) 8.1%
Maryland	Wes Moore	Democratic	2022	Incumbent re-elected.	▌ ✓ Wes Moore (Democratic) 62.8%; ▌Dan Cox (Republican) 33.2%; ▌Andy Ellis (Green) 2.1%; ▌Cathy White (Working Class) 2.0%
Massachusetts	Maura Healey	Democratic	2022	Incumbent re-elected.	▌ ✓ Maura Healey (Democratic) 62.2%; ▌Mike Minogue (Republican) 34.5%; ▌Andrea C. James (Independent) 3.3%
Michigan	Gretchen Whitmer	Democratic	2018	Incumbent term-limited. Democratic hold.	▌ ✓ Jocelyn Benson (Democratic) 54.5%; ▌John James (Republican) 43.8%; Others: ▌Anthony Hudson (Libertarian) 0.9%; ▌Donna Brandenburg (U.S. Taxpayers) 0.4%; ▌Douglas Campbell (Green) 0.4%
Minnesota	Tim Walz	DFL	2018	Incumbent retired. DFL hold.	▌ ✓ Amy Klobuchar (DFL) 55.5%; ▌Lisa Demuth (Republican) 42.6%; ▌Steven Young (Green) 1.8%
Nebraska	Jim Pillen	Republican	2022	Incumbent re-elected.	▌ ✓ Jim Pillen (Republican) 50.8%; ▌Lynne Walz (Democratic) 42.2%; ▌Brett Lindstrom (America First) 4.4%; ▌Rick Beard (Legal Marijuana Now) 2.7%
Nevada	Joe Lombardo	Republican	2022	Incumbent lost re-election. Democratic gain.	▌ ✓ Aaron Ford (Democratic) 51.5%; ▌Joe Lombardo (Republican) 44.2%; ▌Danielle Ford (Independent) 2.9%; ▌None of These Candidates 1.5%
New Hampshire	Kelly Ayotte	Republican	2024	Incumbent re-elected.	▌ ✓ Kelly Ayotte (Republican) 51.4%; ▌Cinde Warmington (Democratic) 47.1%; ▌Stephen Villee (Libertarian) 1.5%
New Mexico	Michelle Lujan Grisham	Democratic	2018	Incumbent term-limited. Democratic hold.	▌ ✓ Deb Haaland (Democratic) 57.3%; ▌Gregg Hull (Republican) 42.7%
New York	Kathy Hochul	Democratic	2021 (Note: Hochul took office after her predecessor, Andrew Cuomo, resigned. She was subsequently elected in 2022.)	Incumbent re-elected.	▌ ✓ Kathy Hochul (Democratic) 59.6%; ▌Bruce Blakeman (Republican) 40.2%
Ohio	Mike DeWine	Republican	2018	Incumbent term-limited. Democratic gain.	▌ ✓ Amy Acton (Democratic) 52.3%; ▌Vivek Ramaswamy (Republican) 44.4%; ▌Donald Kissick (Libertarian) 3.3%
Oklahoma	Kevin Stitt	Republican	2018	Incumbent term-limited. Republican hold.	▌ ✓ Mike Mazzei (Republican) 51.9%; ▌Cyndi Munson (Democratic) 45.9%; Others: ▌Robert Brooks Sr. (Independent) 1.0%; ▌Jerry Griffin (Independent) 0.7%; ▌Orlando Bush (Independent) 0.4%
Oregon	Tina Kotek	Democratic	2022	Incumbent re-elected.	▌ ✓ Tina Kotek (Democratic) 52.6%; ▌Christine Drazan (Republican) 44.5%; ▌Brett Smith (Pacific Green) 2.8%
Pennsylvania	Josh Shapiro	Democratic	2022	Incumbent re-elected.	▌ ✓ Josh Shapiro (Democratic) 60.4%; ▌Stacy Garrity (Republican) 38.3%; ▌Ken Krawchuk (Libertarian) 1.3%
Rhode Island	Dan McKee	Democratic	2021 (Note: McKee took office after his predecessor, Gina Raimondo, resigned. He was subsequently elected in 2022.)	Incumbent lost renomination. Democratic hold.	▌ ✓ Helena Foulkes (Democratic) 57.7%; ▌Ken Block (Independent) 27.8%; ▌Aaron Guckian (Republican) 13.2%; Others: ▌CD Reynolds (Independent) 0.6%; ▌Jasjit Gotra (Independent) 0.5%
South Carolina	Henry McMaster	Republican	2017 (Note: McMaster took office after his predecessor, Nikki Haley, resigned. He was subsequently elected in 2018.)	Incumbent term-limited. Republican hold.	▌ ✓ Alan Wilson (Republican) 51.6%; ▌Jermaine Johnson (Democratic) 47.1%; ▌Michael Addison (United Citizens) 0.8%; ▌Walid Hakim (Green) 0.4%
South Dakota	Larry Rhoden	Republican	2025 (Note: Rhoden took office after his predecessor, Kristi Noem, resigned.)	Incumbent elected to full term.	▌ ✓ Larry Rhoden (Republican) 63.5%; ▌Dan Ahlers (Democratic) 36.5%
Tennessee	Bill Lee	Republican	2018	Incumbent term-limited. Republican hold.	▌ ✓ Marsha Blackburn (Republican) 45.5%; ▌Jerri Green (Democratic) 43.0%; ▌David Hatley (Independent) 9.3%; Others: ▌Lauren Pinkston (Independent) 1.2%; ▌Dean Brewer (Independent) 0.2%; ▌Ray Brown (Independent) 0.1%; ▌Wendell Jackson (Independent) 0.1%; ▌Eddie Lee Murphy (Independent) 0.1%; ▌Robert Vick (Independent) 0.1%; ▌Misam Abidi (Independent) 0.1%; ▌Charles Van Morgan (Independent) 0.1%; ▌L. Webb Taylor (Independent) 0.1%; ▌Dave Seeman (Independent) 0.0%; ▌Victor Scoggin (Independent) 0.0%; ▌Karl Smithson (Independent) 0.0%
Texas	Greg Abbott	Republican	2014	Incumbent lost re-election. Democratic gain.	▌ ✓ Gina Hinojosa (Democratic) 52.8%; ▌Greg Abbott (Republican) 45.7%; ▌Pat Dixon (Libertarian) 1.5%
Vermont	Phil Scott	Republican	2016	Incumbent re-elected.	▌ ✓ Phil Scott (Republican) 52.6%; ▌Amanda Janoo (Democratic) 45.6%; Others: ▌Brian Judd (Independent) 0.8%; ▌June Goodband (Green Mountain) 0.4%; ▌Dean Roy (Freedom and Unity) 0.4%
Wisconsin	Tony Evers	Democratic	2018	Incumbent retiring. Democratic hold.	▌ ✓ David Crowley (Democratic) 54.0%; ▌Tom Tiffany (Republican) 46.0%
Wyoming	Mark Gordon	Republican	2018	Incumbent term-limited. Republican hold.	▌ ✓ Eric Barlow (Republican) 68.1%; ▌Rebecca Bextel (Constitution) 16.7%; ▌Kenneth Casner (Democratic) 14.6%

=== Territories and federal district ===
Territory	Governor	Party	First elected	Status	Candidates
District of Columbia	Muriel Bowser	Democratic	2014	Incumbent retiring. Democratic hold.	▌ ✓ Janeese Lewis George (Democratic) 84.0%; ▌Rhonda Hamilton (Independent) 10.3%; ▌Robert Gross (Green) 3.6%
Guam	Lou Leon Guerrero	Democratic	2018	Incumbent term-limited. Republican gain.	▌ ✓ Vicente Ada (Republican) 51.45%; ▌Therese Terlaje (Democratic) 48.15%
Northern Mariana Islands	David M. Apatang	Independent	2025 (Note: Apatang took office after his predecessor, Arnold Palacios, died.)	Incumbent retiring. New governor to be elected on November 20, 2026 after no candidate received over 50% of the vote on November 3, 2026.	First round: ▌ Ralph Torres (Republican) 49.5%; ▌ Blas T. Attao (Independent) 38.7%; ▌Lawrence F. Camacho (Independent) 11.8%; Runoff: ▌Ralph Torres (Republican); ▌Blas T. Attao (Independent Democrat)
U.S. Virgin Islands	Albert Bryan	Democratic	2018	Incumbent term-limited. Democratic hold.	▌ ✓ Stacey Plaskett (Democratic) 62.8%; ▌Adlah Donastorg Jr. (Independent) 13.3%; ▌Oakland Benta (Independent) 12.0%; ▌Warren Mosler (Independent) 6.8%; ▌Gustav James (Independent) 3.4%

== Alabama ==
Alabama gubernatorial election
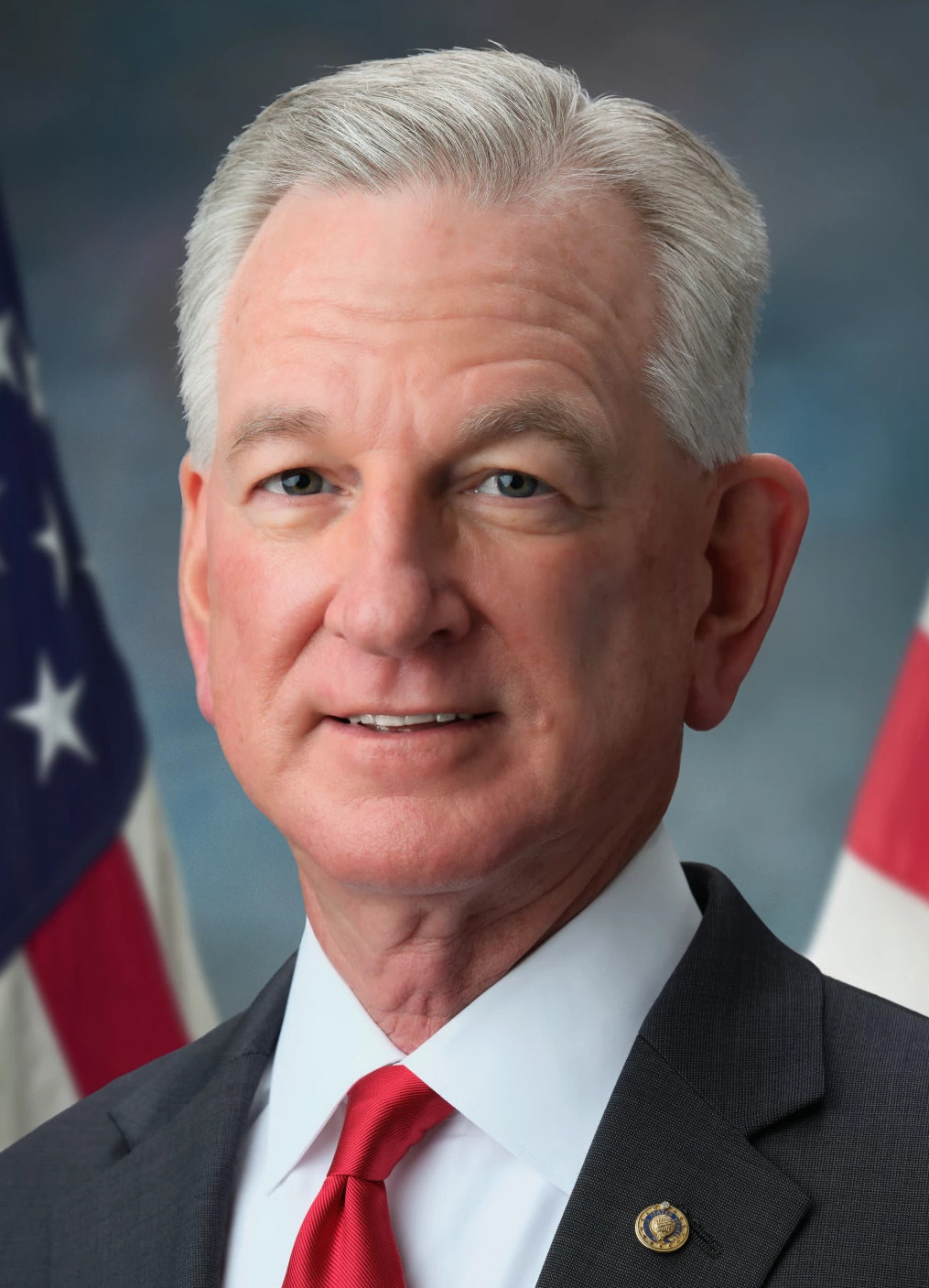

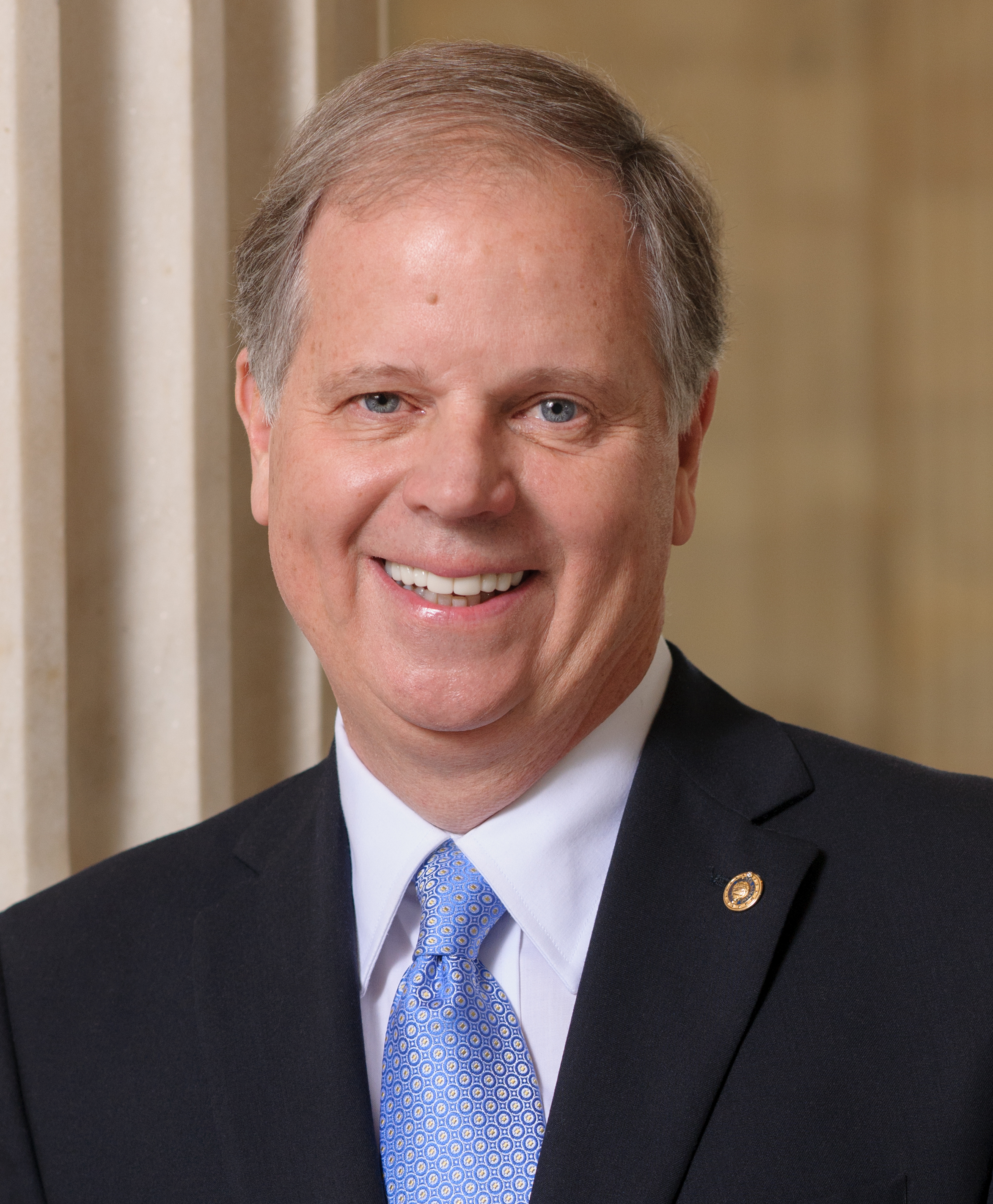
Nominee	Tommy Tuberville	Doug Jones
Party	Republican	Democratic
Popular vote	873,332	806,270
Percentage	52.0%	48.0%
- Tuberville: 50–60% 60–70% 70–80% 80–90% Jones: 50–60% 60–70% 70–80% 80–90%
Governor before election
Kay Ivey
Republican
Elected Governor
Tommy Tuberville
Republican

Governor Kay Ivey, a Republican, was re-elected in 2022 with 67.4% of the vote. She will be term-limited by the Constitution of Alabama in 2026 and cannot seek re-election to a third consecutive full term. Republican U.S. Senator Tommy Tuberville entered the gubernatorial race in May 2025, joined by former candidate for Alabama's 6th congressional district in 2024 Ken McFeeters and event center operations manager Will Santivasci.

Democratic candidates include former U.S. Senator Doug Jones; the 2022 gubernatorial nominee Yolanda Flowers; Will Boyd, a former city councilor of Greenville, Illinois, and the nominee for Alabama Lieutenant Governor in 2018 and for U.S. Senate in 2022; pastor Ja'Mel Brown; candidate for governor in 2022 Chad Chig Martin; and former state representative Nathan Mathis.

As Jones and Tuberville won their respective primaries, the gubernatorial election will be a rematch of the 2020 United States Senate election, which saw Tuberville defeat Jones. Tuberville has faced several challenges to his eligibility for the governorship.

On November 4, 2026, Tuberville was declared the winner by the Associated Press. He won 52% to Jones's 48%, making it the closest gubernatorial election in Alabama since 2002.

== Alaska ==
Alaska gubernatorial election
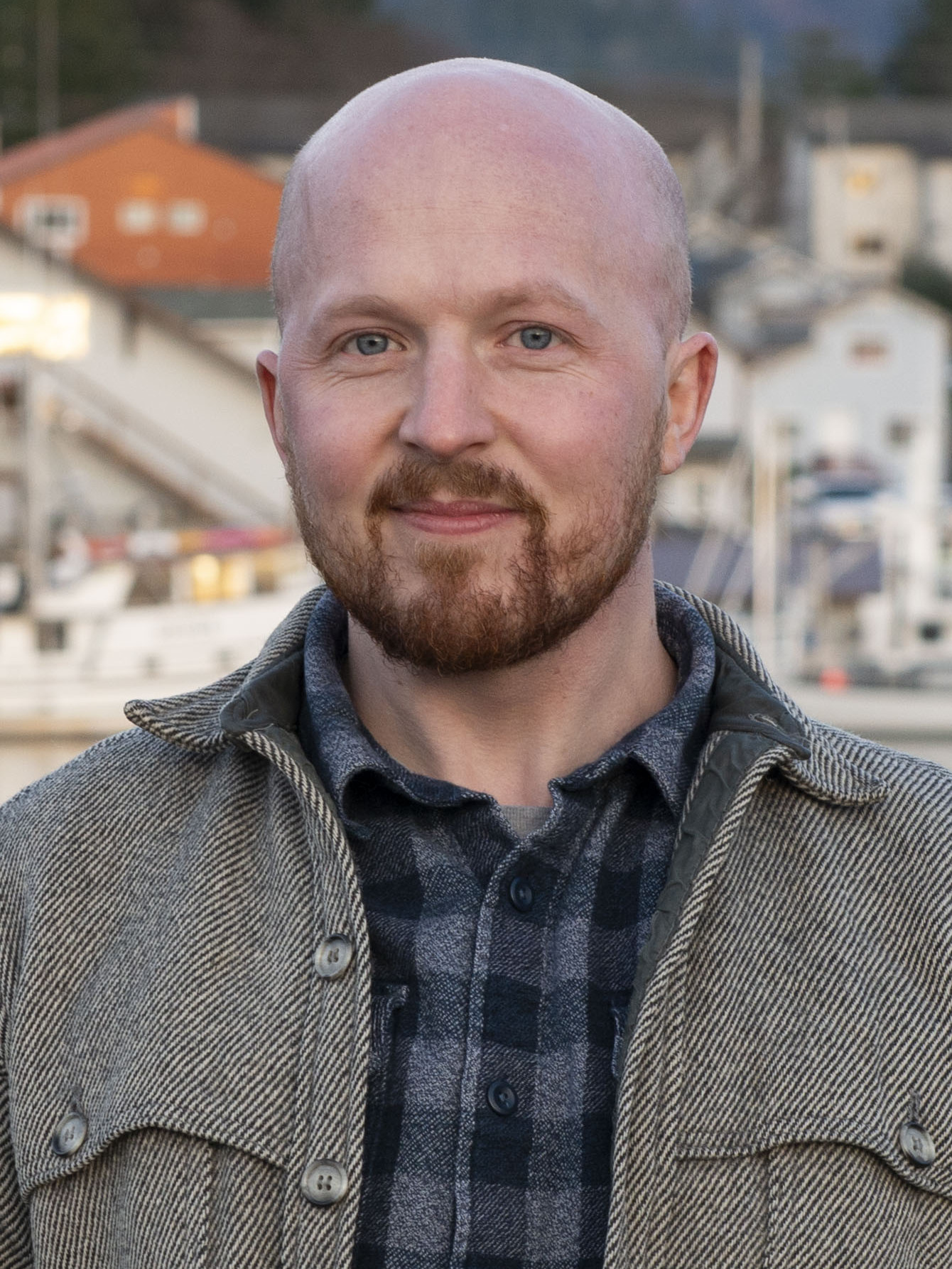

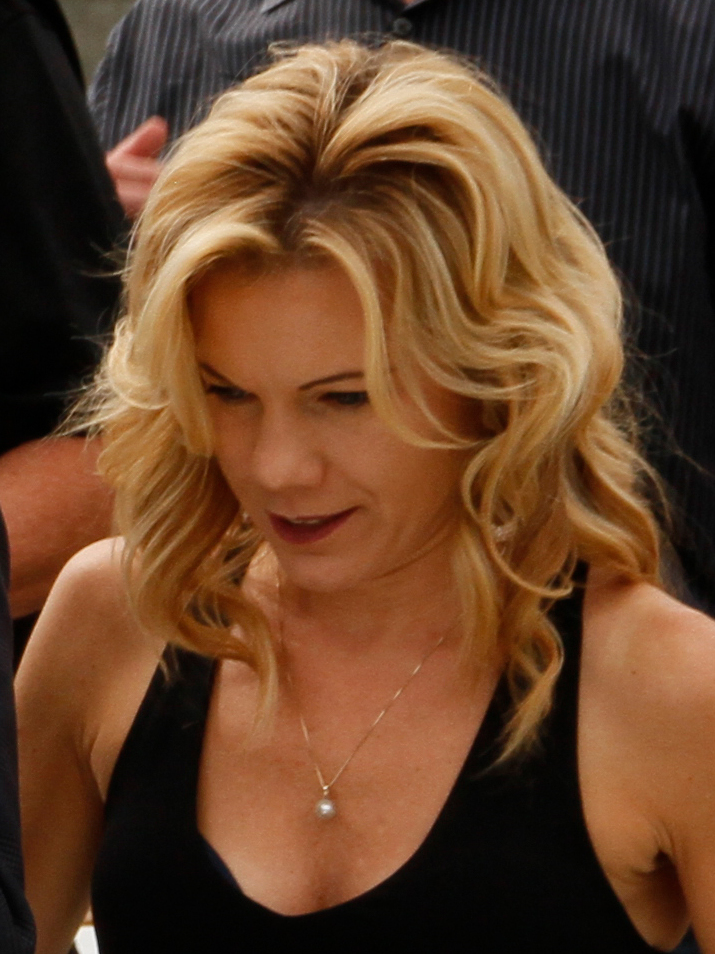

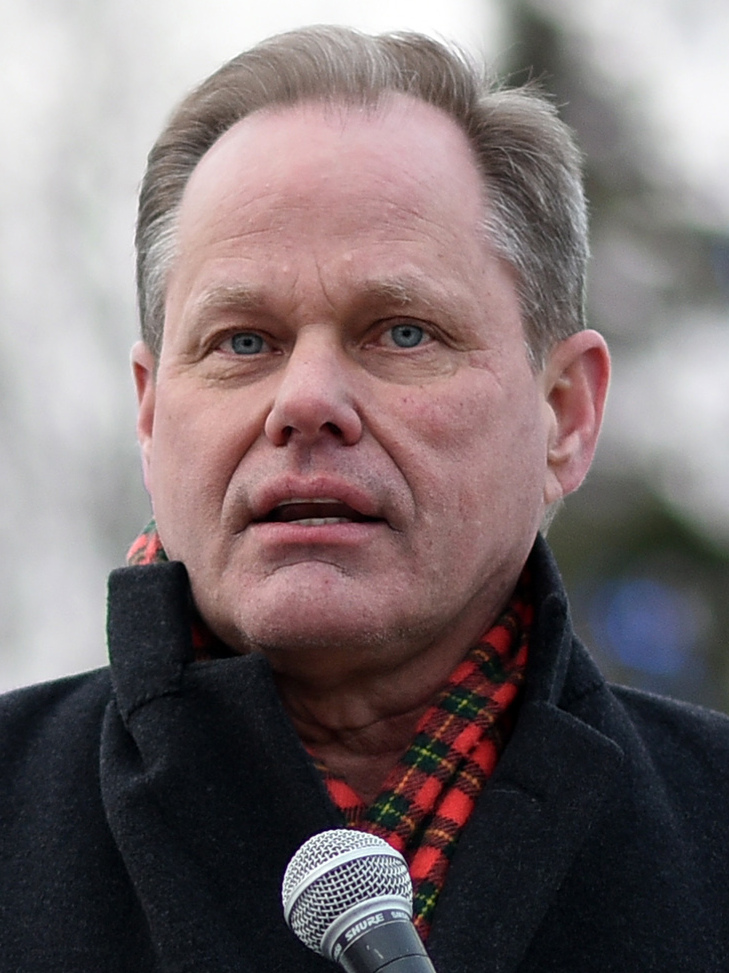

Candidate	Jonathan Kreiss-Tomkins	Bernadette Wilson
Party	Democratic	Republican
Running mate	Zac Johnson	Mike Shower
Popular vote	139,293	77,110
Percentage	50.8%	28.1%
Candidate	Dave Bronson	Treg Taylor
Party	Republican	Republican
Running mate	Josh Church	Candice English
Popular vote	37,252	19,709
Percentage	13.6%	7.2%
Governor before election
Mike Dunleavy
Republican
Elected Governor
Jonathan Kreiss-Tomkins
Democratic

Governor Mike Dunleavy, a Republican, was re-elected in 2022 with 50.3% of the vote. He will be term-limited by the Constitution of Alaska in 2026 and cannot seek re-election to a third consecutive term.

A nonpartisan primary was held on August 18, 2026, with the top four candidates by vote count (using first past the post) advancing to the general election, which will be conducted using instant-runoff ranked-choice voting. The advancing candidates are Republicans former state Attorney General Treg Taylor, businesswoman Bernadette Wilson; former Anchorage mayor Dave Bronson; and Democratic former state representative Jonathan Kreiss-Tomkins.

After initially finishing second in the primary, former state senator Tom Begich withdrew and endorsed Kreiss-Tomkins, allowing fifth-place finisher Taylor to advance to the general election. However, the Alaska Public Offices Commission recommended against certifying Taylor's candidacy after finding that his financial disclosure did not substantially comply with state law. On August 31, Lieutenant Governor Nancy Dahlstrom declined to certify Taylor, temporarily elevating his running mate, Candice English, to the gubernatorial nomination; English subsequently selected Taylor's wife, Jodi Taylor, as her running mate. On September 4, Dahlstrom reversed her decision and announced that Taylor would be certified after a preliminary review by the Alaska Department of Law raised questions about whether the financial disclosure requirements had been applied consistently.

Kreiss-Tomkins won the election, receiving more than 50% of the first-choice vote and avoiding a ranked-choice runoff.

== Arizona ==
Arizona gubernatorial election
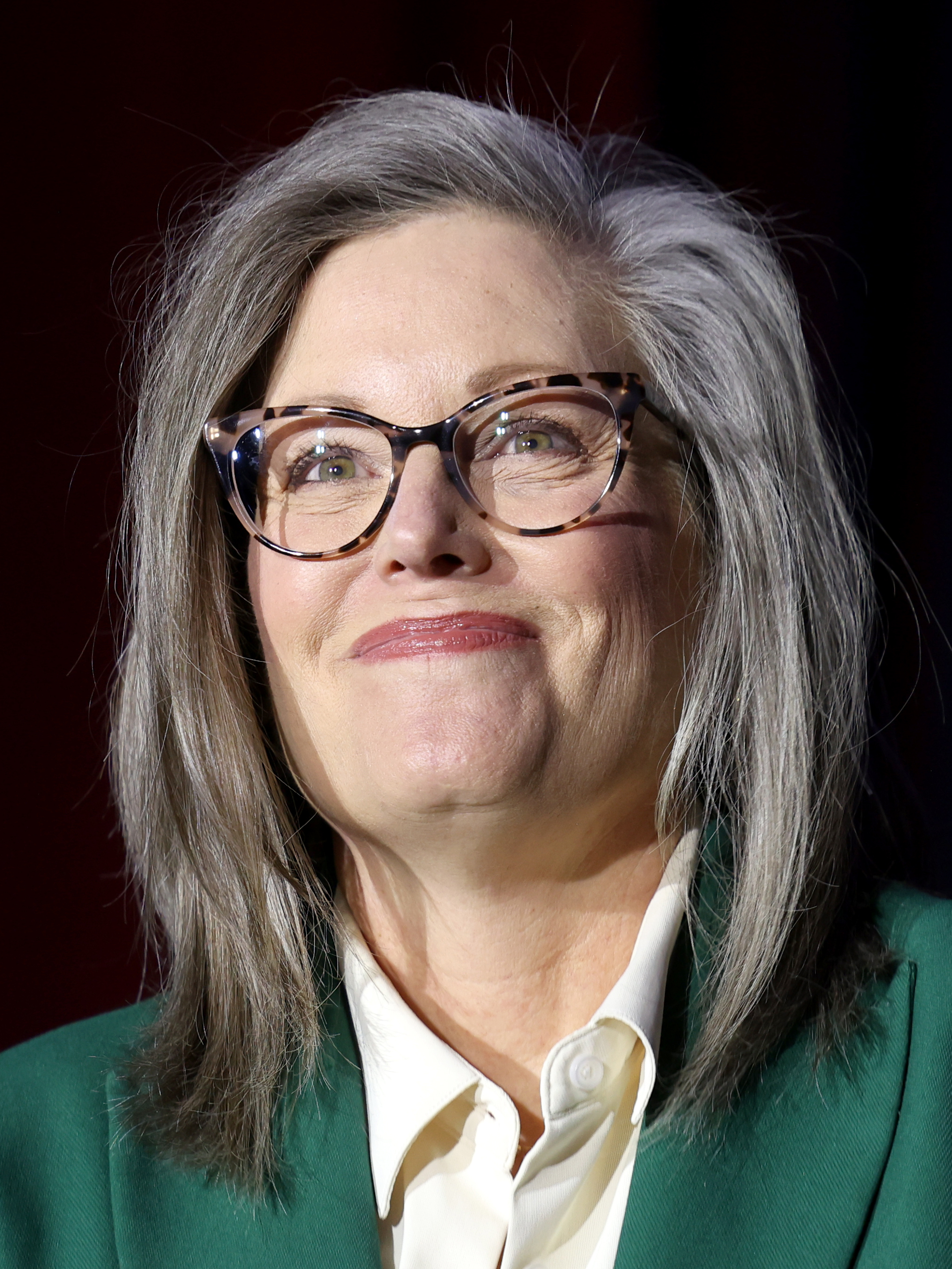

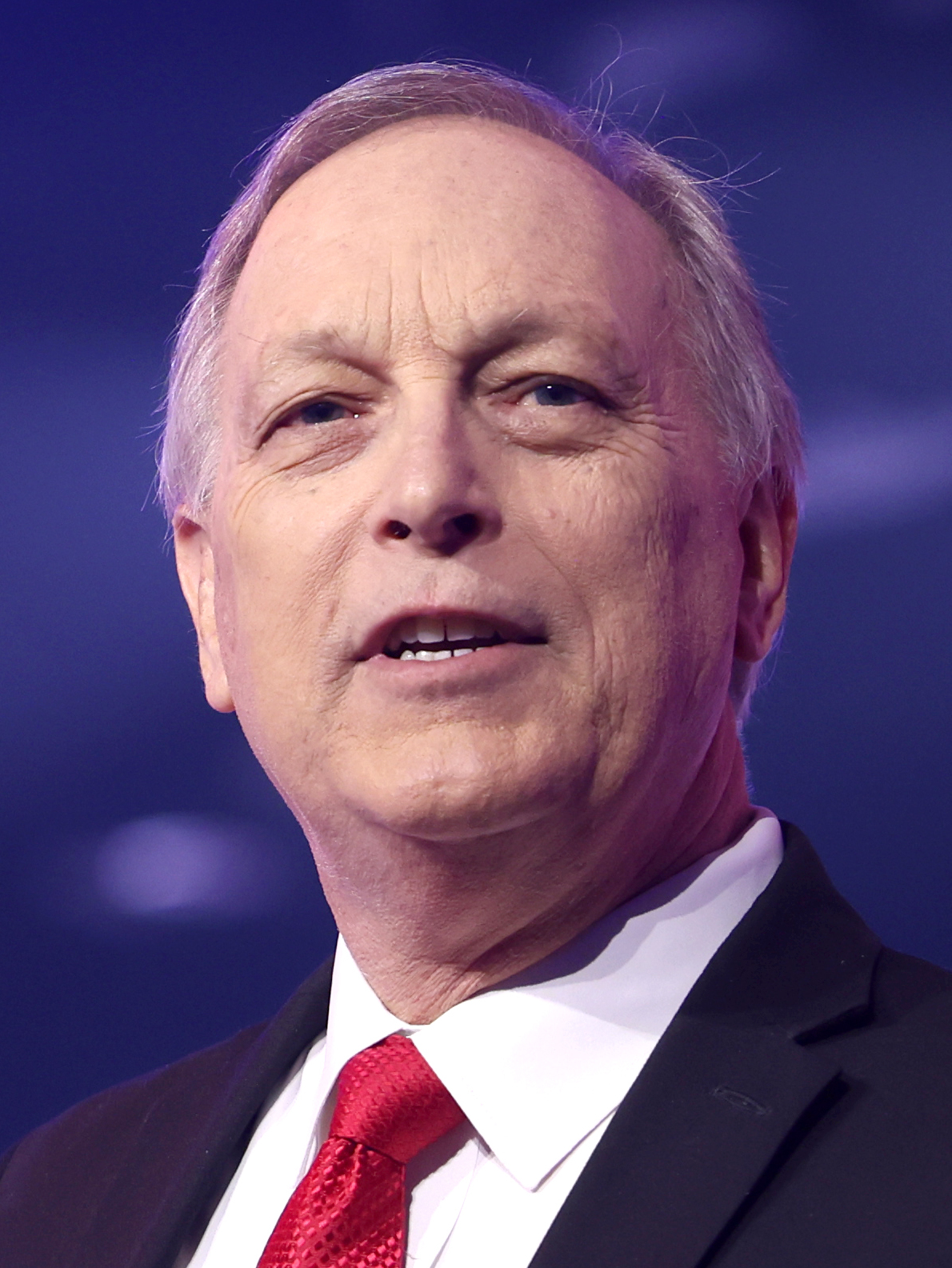
Nominee	Katie Hobbs	Andy Biggs
Party	Democratic	Republican
Running mate	John Giles	Sine Kerr
Popular vote	1,433,772	1,093,643
Percentage	55.7%	42.5%
- Hobbs: 40–50% 50–60% 60–70% 70–80% 80–90% Biggs: 40–50% 50–60% 60–70% 70–80%
Governor before election
Katie Hobbs
Democratic
Elected Governor
Katie Hobbs
Democratic

Governor Katie Hobbs, a Democrat, was elected in 2022 with 50.3% of the vote. Starting with this election cycle, gubernatorial candidates were required to nominate a running mate for the newly established office of Lieutenant Governor. Hobbs ran for re-election to a second term and was the nominee, as no other candidates successfully filed for the Democratic primary.

U.S. Representative from Arizona's 5th congressional district Andy Biggs defeated U.S. Representative from Arizona's 1st congressional district David Schweikert, as well as business owner Ken Miceli and concrete plumbing contractor Scott Neely with 74% of the vote in the Republican primary.

Healthcare entrepreneur Hugh Lytle and Teri Hourihan ran in the No Labels/Arizona Independent Party primary. Former Democratic state representative Leezah Sun announced a campaign as an independent, but did not appear on the ballot.

This was the first gubernatorial election in which a candidate is required to select a running mate, following the passage of Proposition 131 in the 2022 elections.

Hobbs defeated Biggs by 13 points.

== Arkansas ==
Arkansas gubernatorial election
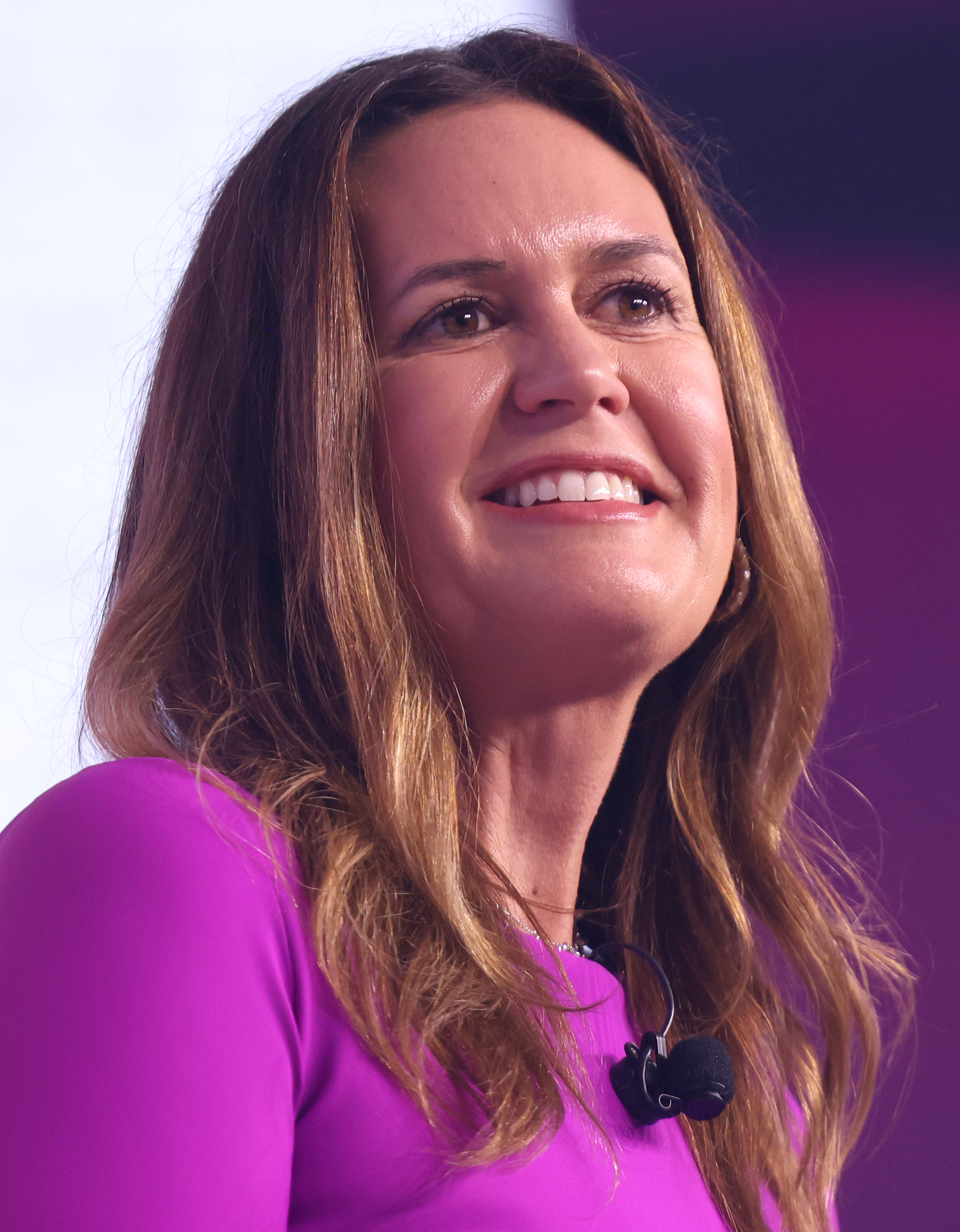

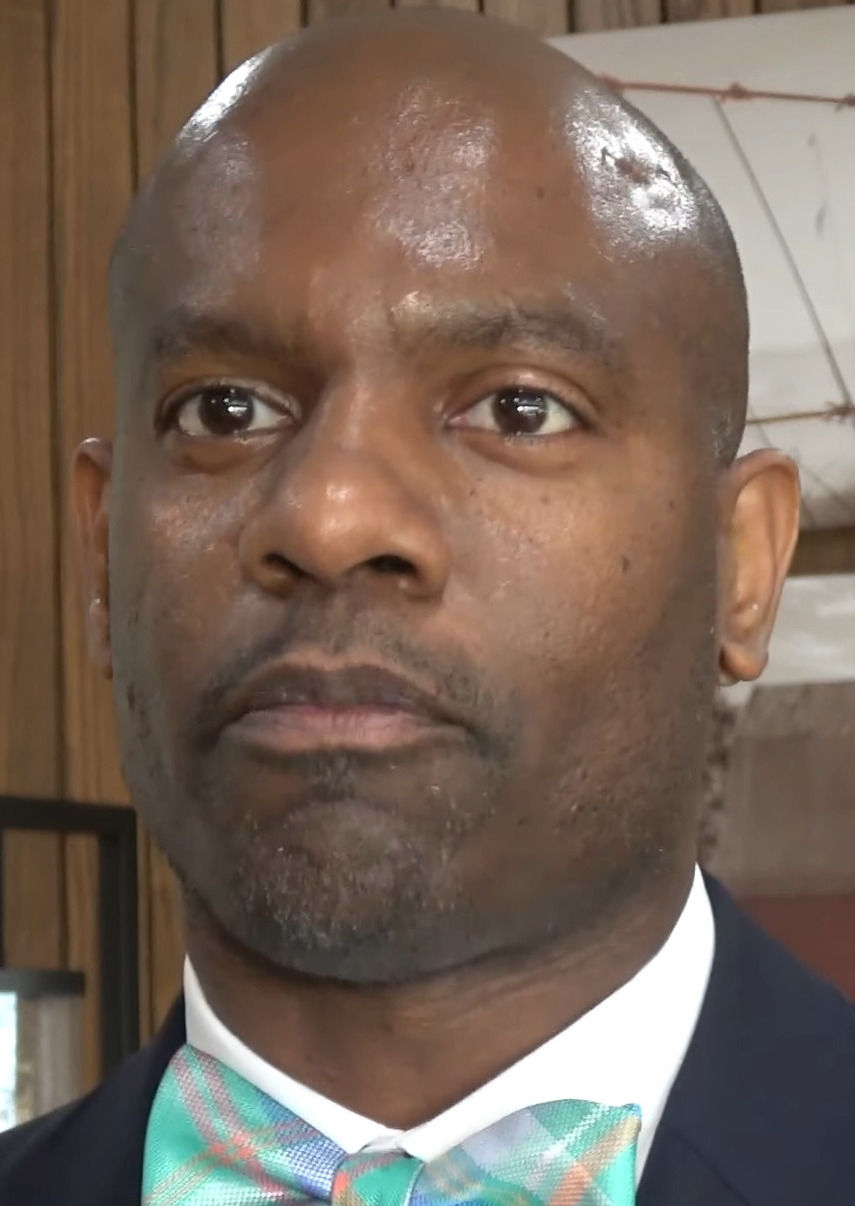

Nominee	Sarah Huckabee Sanders	Fredrick Love	Colt Shelby
Party	Republican	Democratic	Libertarian
Popular vote	477,304	341,842	66,913
Percentage	53.9%	38.6%	7.6%
- Sanders: 40–50% 50–60% 60–70% 70–80% Love: 50–60% 60–70% Shelby: 40–50%
Governor before election
Sarah Huckabee Sanders
Republican
Elected Governor
Sarah Huckabee Sanders
Republican

Governor Sarah Huckabee Sanders, a Republican, was elected in 2022 with 63.1% of the vote. She is seeking re-election to a second term and ran unopposed for the Republican nomination.

State senator Fredrick Love defeated former Walmart executive Supha Xayprasith Mays in the Democratic primary on March 3, 2026.

Farmer Colt Shelby is running in the general election as a Libertarian.

Sarah Huckabee Sanders was re-elected. Shelby became the first third-party Arkansas gubernatorial candidate to win a county since 1896 when he carried his home county of Franklin.

== California ==
California gubernatorial election
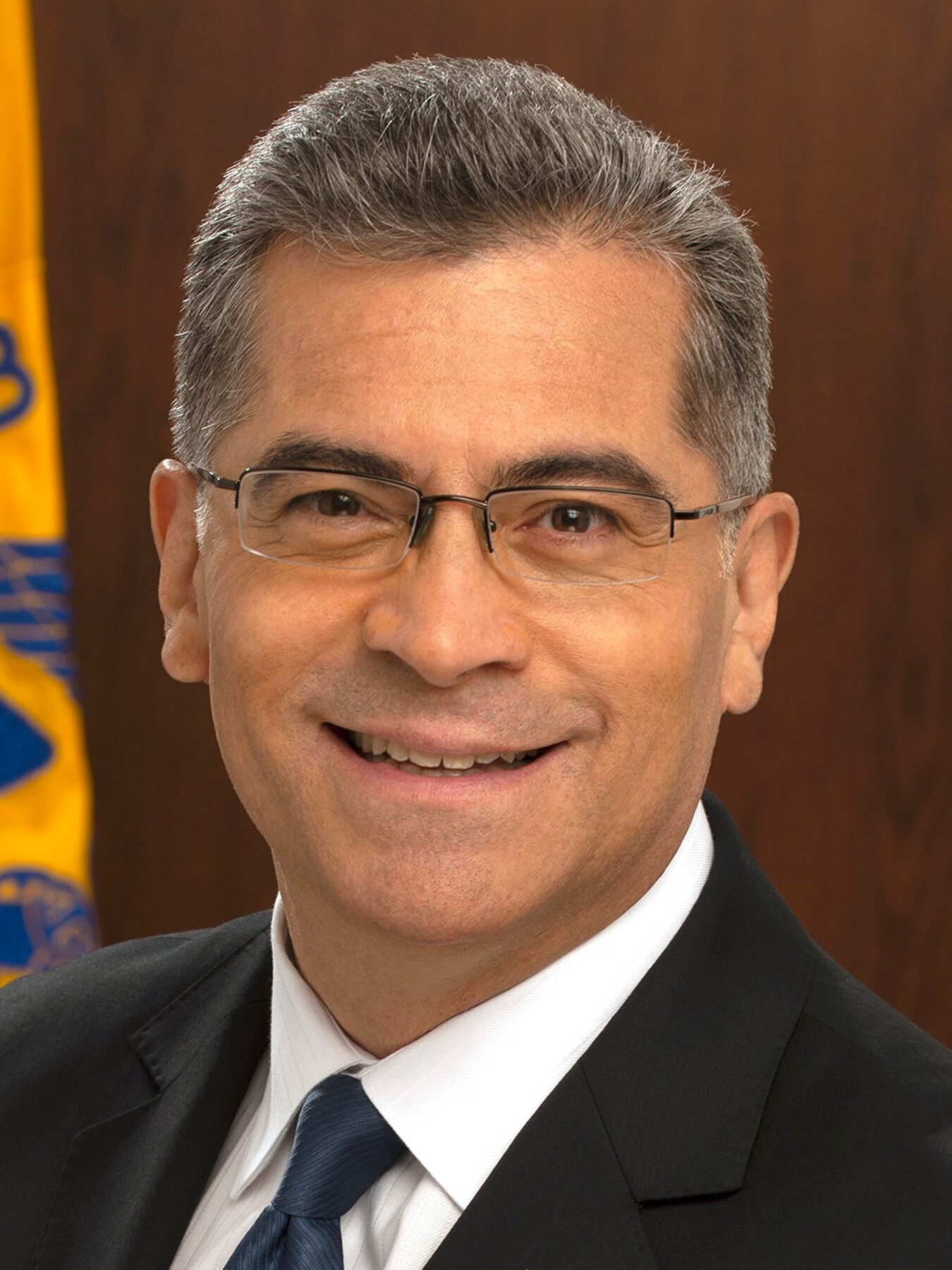

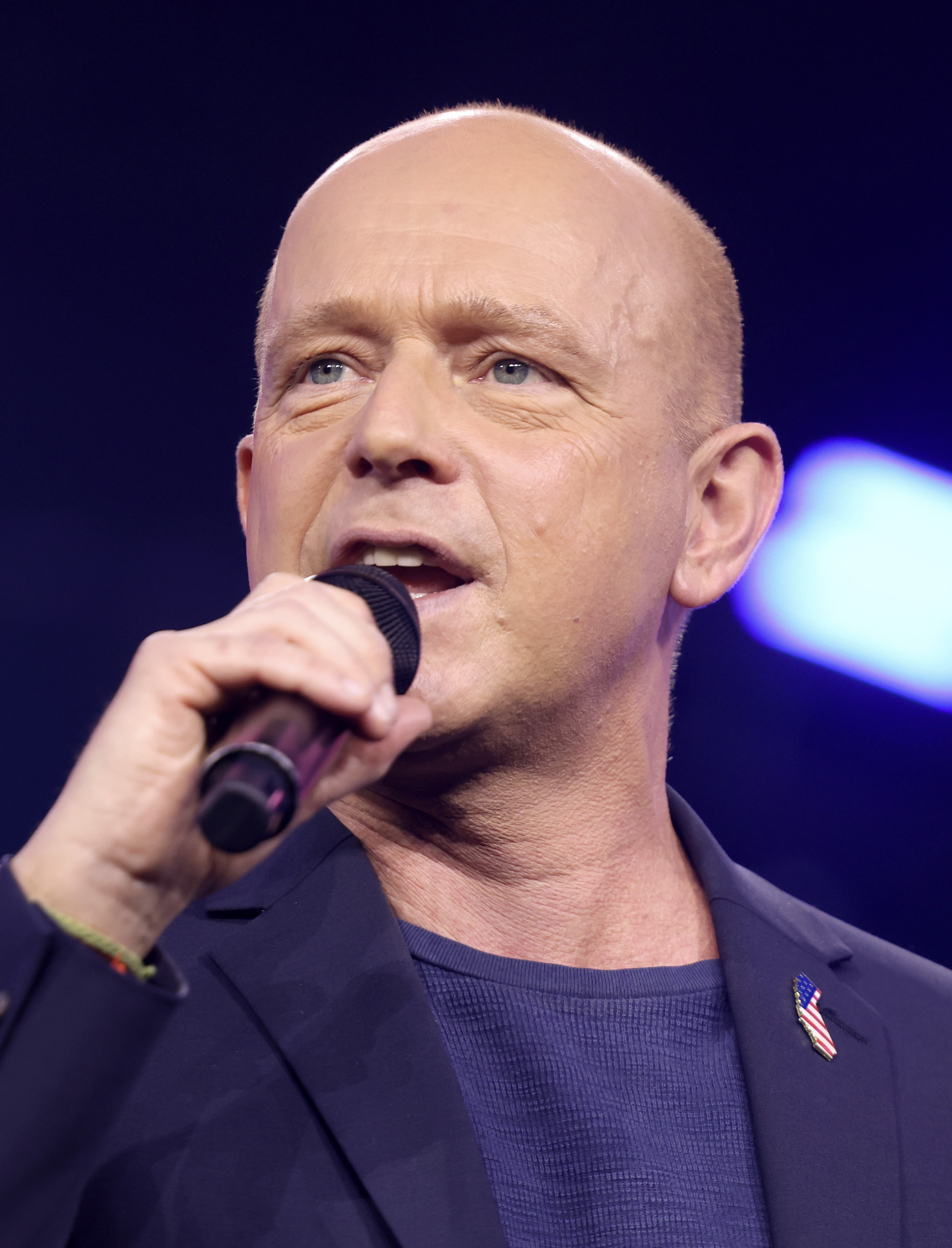
Candidate	Xavier Becerra	Steve Hilton
Party	Democratic	Republican
Popular vote	8,526,667	4,470,796
Percentage	65.6%	34.4%
- Becerra: 50–60% 60–70% 70–80% 80–90% Hilton: 50–60% 60–70% 70–80%
Governor before election
Gavin Newsom
Democratic
Elected Governor
Xavier Becerra
Democratic

Democratic Governor Gavin Newsom was re-elected in 2022 with 59.2% of the vote. He is term-limited by the California Constitution in 2026, and cannot seek re-election to a third term. More than sixty candidates appeared on the June 2026 primary ballot. Democrat Xavier Becerra, former U.S. Secretary of Health and Human Services and former California Attorney General, and Republican political commentator Steve Hilton advanced to the general election. Becerra won the election.

Other Democratic candidates included San Jose mayor Matt Mahan; former congresswoman for California's 47th congressional district Katie Porter; businessman and 2020 presidential candidate Tom Steyer; State Superintendent of Public Instruction Tony Thurmond; and former Los Angeles Mayor Antonio Villaraigosa.

U.S. representative Eric Swalwell initially announced a campaign in November 2025, but withdrew and resigned from Congress in April 2026 amid sexual assault allegations, with his name still on the ballot. Former state Controller Betty Yee also withdrew from the race in April 2026 and will remain on the ballot.

Former Vice President of the United States and 2024 Democratic nominee for President Kamala Harris had considered running, but ultimately decided not to enter the race.

Other Republican candidates included Riverside County Sheriff Chad Bianco, diplomat Tim Nelson and businessman Leo Zacky.

Butch Ware, the Green Party's 2024 vice presidential nominee, announced his candidacy but did not meet the requirements to appear on the primary ballot and instead ran as a write-in candidate.

Becerra won the election by over 30 points.

== Colorado ==
Colorado gubernatorial election
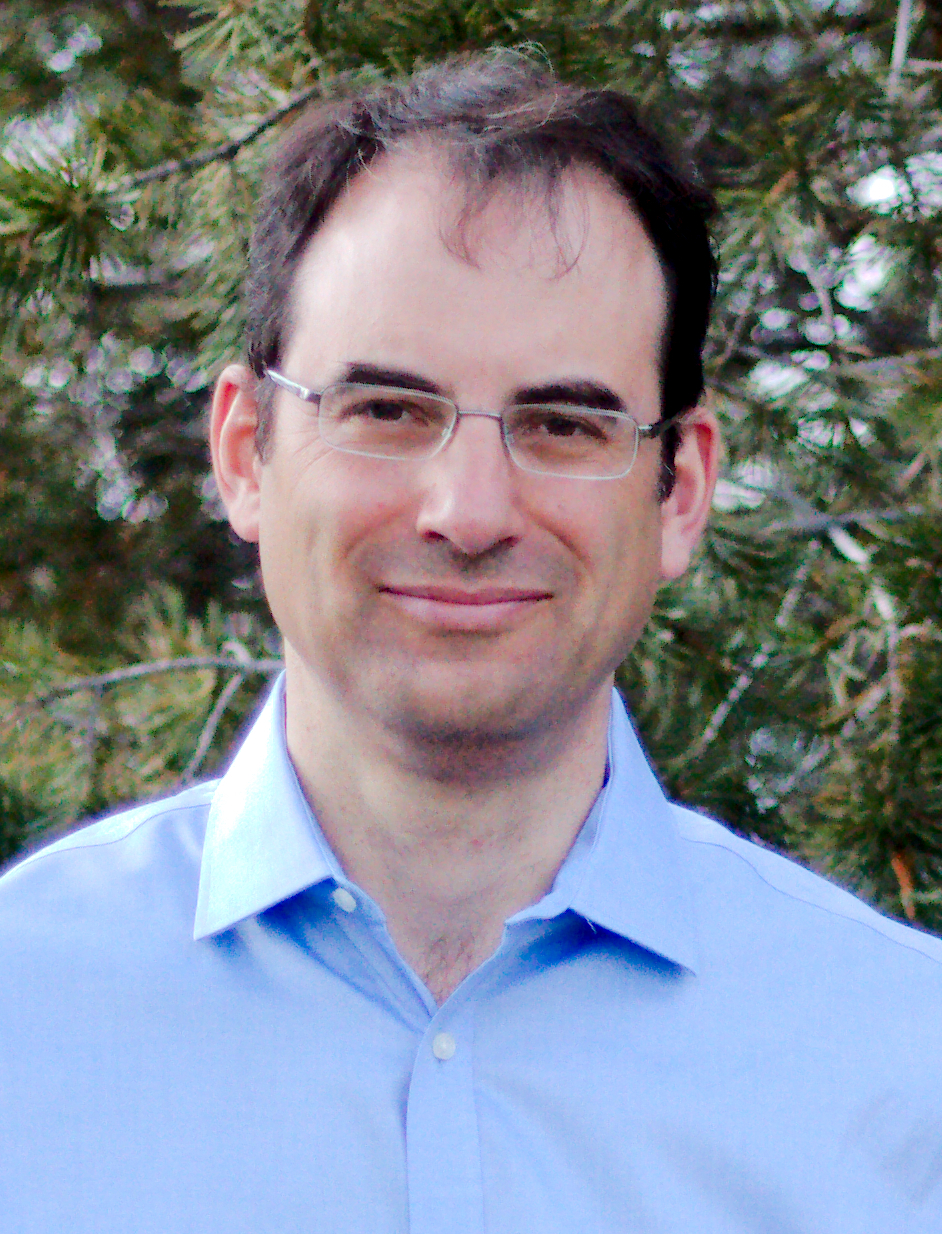

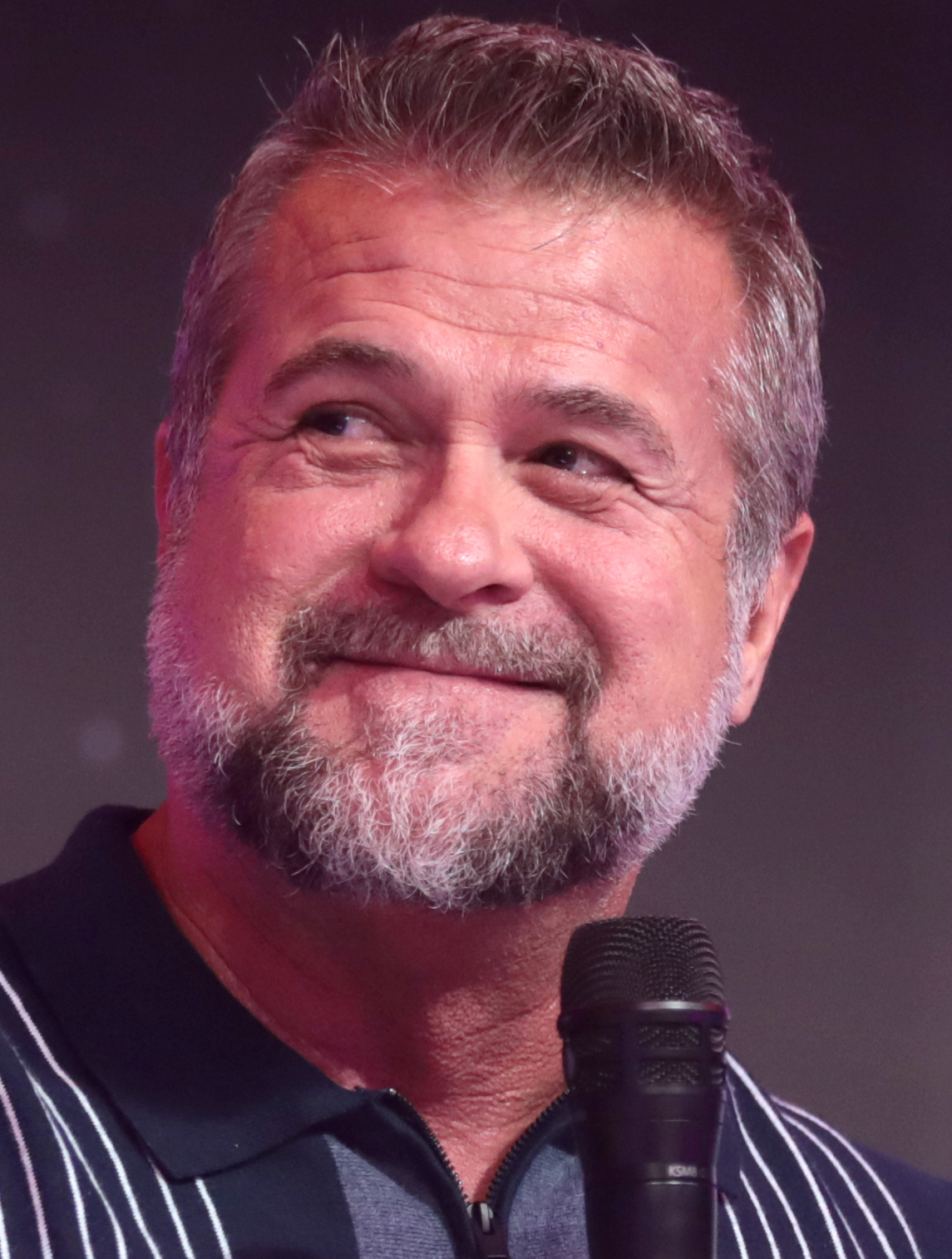
Nominee	Phil Weiser	Victor Marx
Party	Democratic	Republican
Running mate	Lesley Dahlkemper	George Markert
Popular vote	1,628,795	887,672
Percentage	61.1%	33.3%
- Weiser: 40–50% 50–60% 60–70% 70–80% 80–90% Marx: 40–50% 50–60% 60–70% 70–80%
Governor before election
Jared Polis
Democratic
Elected Governor
Phil Weiser
Democratic

Governor Jared Polis, a Democrat, was re-elected in 2022 with 58.5% of the vote. He will be term-limited by the Colorado Constitution in 2026 and cannot seek re-election to a third consecutive term.

State Attorney General Phil Weiser defeated U.S. Senator Michael Bennet for the Democratic nomination.

On the Republican side, ministry leader Victor Marx defeated state representative Scott Bottoms and state senator Barbara Kirkmeyer for the nomination.

Former U.S. Representative for Colorado's 4th congressional district Greg Lopez initially announced his campaign as a Republican but later left the party in January 2026 and is continuing his campaign as an independent.

Weiser defeated Marx and Lopez in a landslide.

== Connecticut ==
Connecticut gubernatorial election
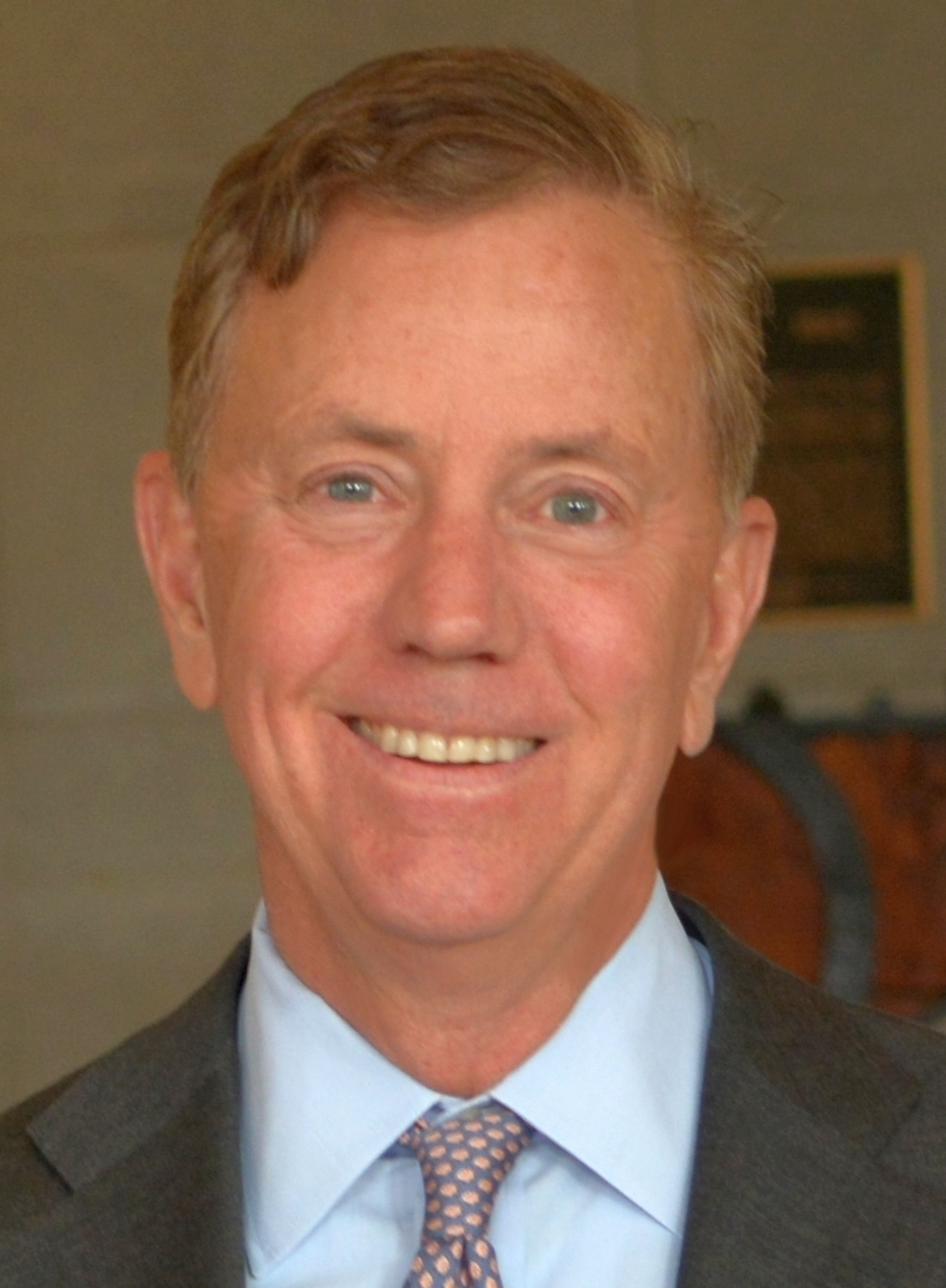

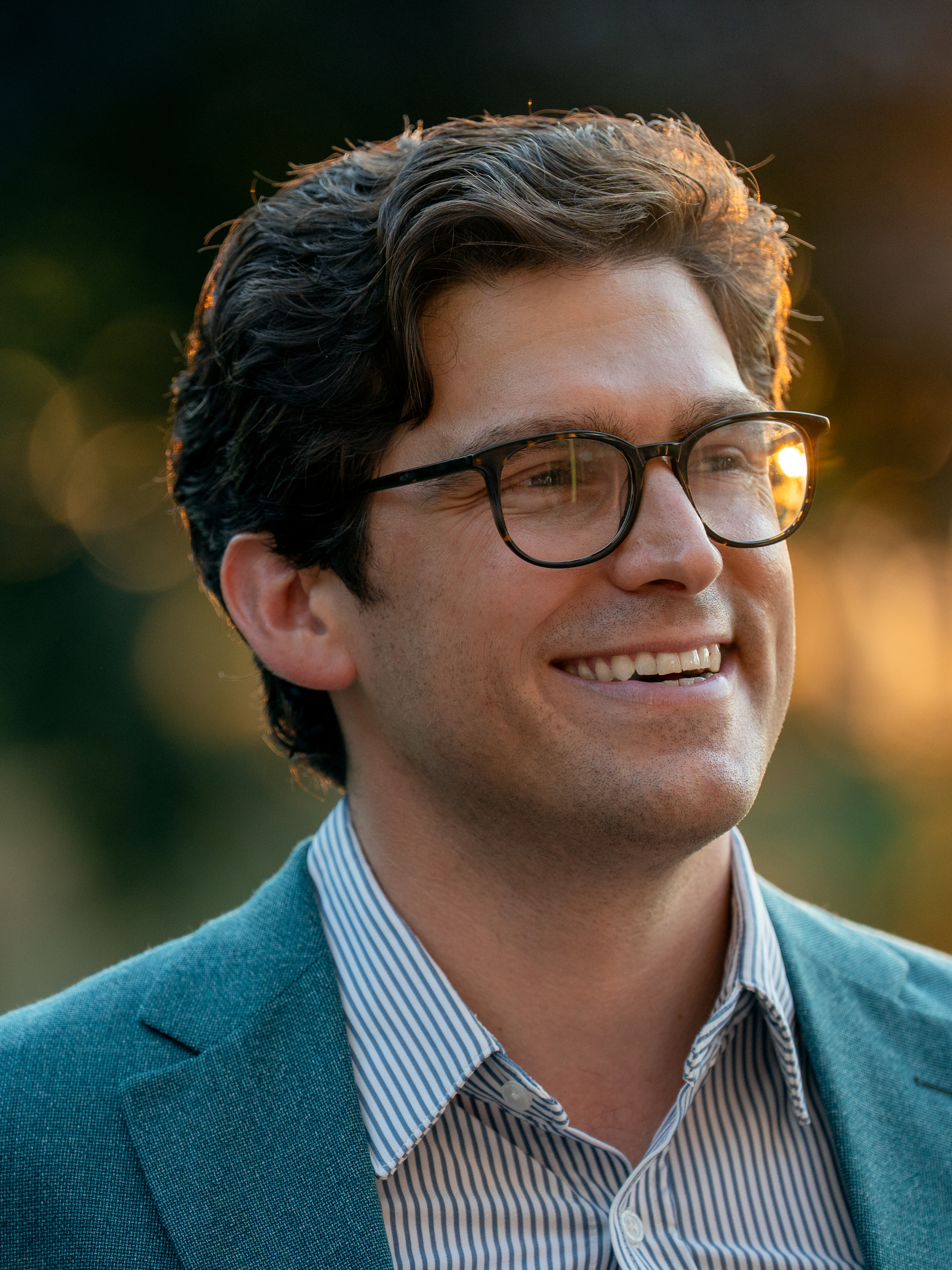
Nominee	Ned Lamont	Ryan Fazio
Party	Democratic	Republican
Alliance	Working Families	Independent Party
Running mate	Susan Bysiewicz	Matthew Corey
Popular vote	773,554	525,121
Percentage	59.6%	40.4%
- Lamont: 50–60% 60–70% 70–80% 80–90% Fazio: 50–60% 60–70%
Governor before election
Ned Lamont
Democratic
Elected Governor
Ned Lamont
Democratic

Governor Ned Lamont, a Democrat, was re-elected in 2022 with 56% of the vote. Because Connecticut does not have gubernatorial term limits in its Constitution, Lamont has announced that he is running for a third term. Lamont fended off a primary challenge from State representative for the 88th district Josh Elliott.

State senator for the 36th district Ryan Fazio is the Republican nominee. Former lieutenant governor of New York Betsy McCaugheyinitially announced her candidacy for the Republican nomination in March 2026 but withdrew after not receiving 15% of the convention vote in May. New Britain mayor Erin Stewart initially ran but dropped out of the race in May 2026, after allegations of misconduct during her tenure as mayor.

Lamont defeated Fazio by nearly 20 points.

== Florida ==
Florida gubernatorial election
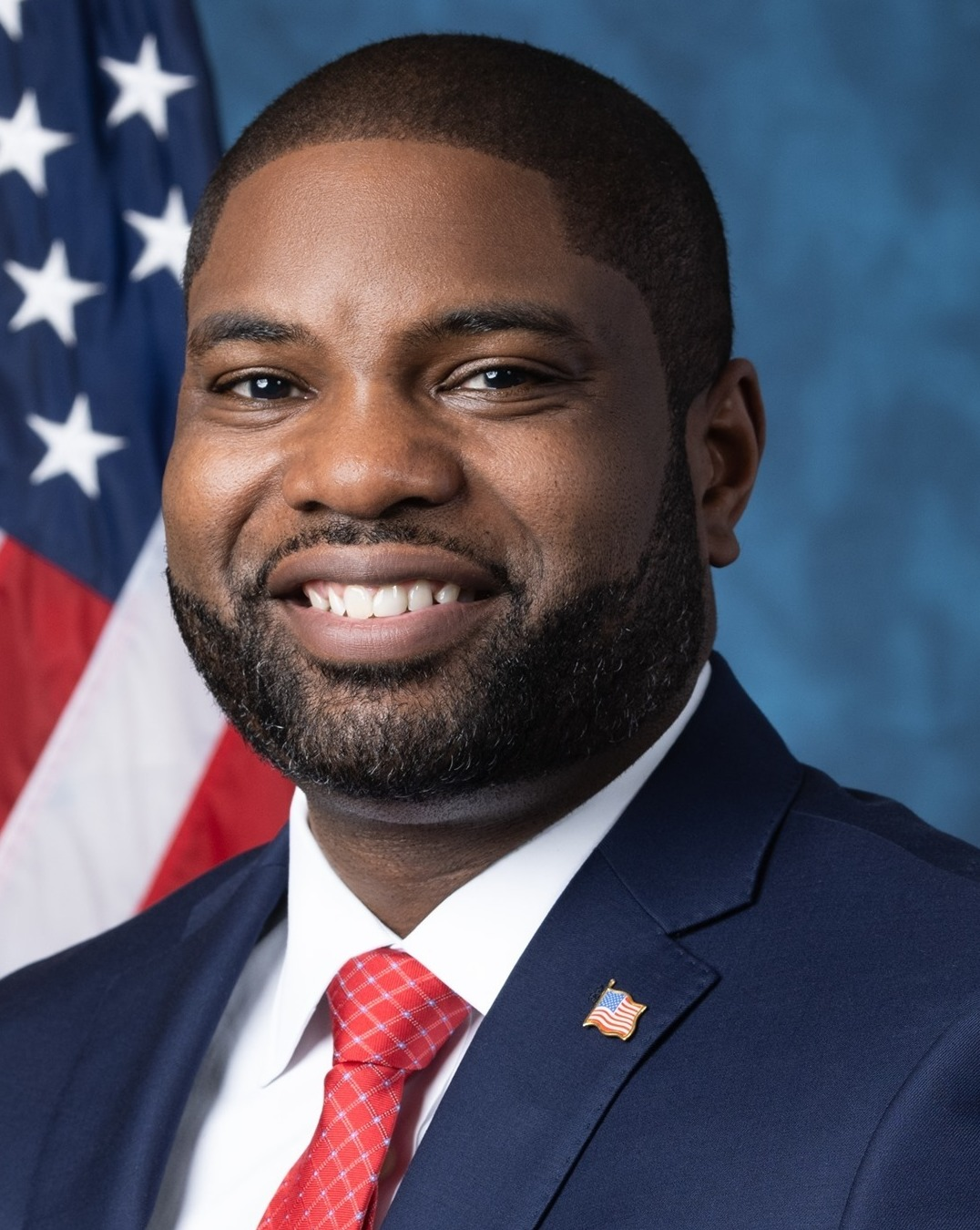

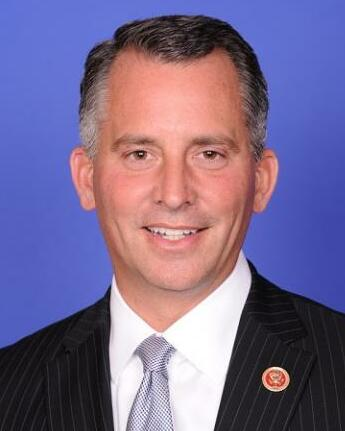
Nominee	Byron Donalds	David Jolly
Party	Republican	Democratic
Running mate	Bryan Avila	Gwen Graham
Popular vote	4,135,701	4,029,461
Percentage	50.0%	48.7%
- Donalds: 50–60% 60–70% 70–80% 80–90% Jolly: 50–60% 60–70%
Governor before election
Ron DeSantis
Republican
Elected Governor
Byron Donalds
Republican

Republican Governor Ron DeSantis was re-elected in 2022 with 59.4% of the vote. He is term-limited by the Florida Constitution in 2026 and cannot seek re-election to a third consecutive term.

U.S. representative for Florida's 19th congressional district Byron Donalds announced his candidacy on February 25, 2025, becoming the first major Republican to enter the race. Paul Renner, former Speaker of the Florida House of Representatives, announced his candidacy in September 2025, and Lieutenant Governor Jay Collins joined the race in January 2026. Other Republican candidates included entrepreneur James Fishback. Donalds won the nomination with 47.8% of the vote.

Former Republican U.S. representative for Florida's 13th congressional district David Jolly, a staunch critic of Trump, joined the Democratic Party in 2025 and announced his candidacy June 2025. He won the Democratic nomination with 61.0% of the vote.

Former State Senate Minority Leader Jason Pizzo launched an independent bid for governor in May 2025, while Moliere Dimanche announced his own independent campaign in July 2024, becoming the first Haitian candidate for governor in Florida's history. Pizzo ultimately withdrew from the race.

Donalds won the election by a 50.01%–48.72% margin. Donalds’ victory was historic as Florida’s first African American governor and the first elected African American Republican governor in U.S. history. The narrow Republican victory also marked a significant contrast with the party’s landslide gubernatorial win in 2022. This was the second consecutive Florida gubernatorial election in which the Democratic nominee was a former Republican and the eighth consecutive victory for Republicans.

== Georgia ==
Georgia gubernatorial election
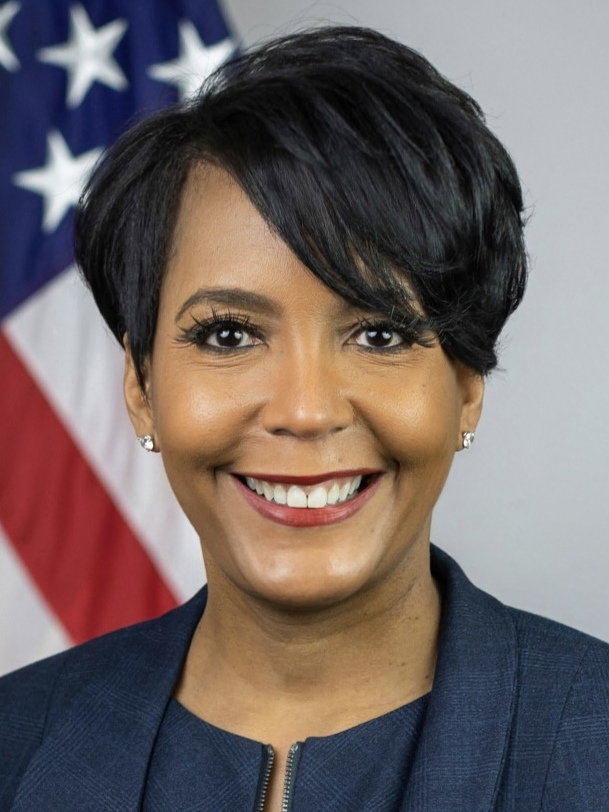

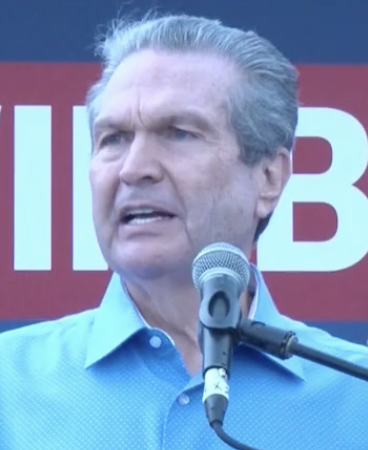
Nominee	Keisha Lance Bottoms	Rick Jackson
Party	Democratic	Republican
Popular vote	2,271,581	1,909,566
Percentage	54.3%	45.7%
- Bottoms: 50–60% 60–70% 70–80% 80–90% Jackson: 50–60% 60–70% 70–80% 80–90% 90–100%
Governor before election
Brian Kemp
Republican
Elected Governor
Keisha Lance Bottoms
Democratic

Republican Governor Brian Kemp was re-elected in 2022 with 53.4% of the vote. He is term-limited by the Georgia Constitution in 2026 and cannot seek re-election to a third consecutive term.

Attorney General Chris Carr, Lieutenant Governor Burt Jones, Secretary of State Brad Raffensperger, and healthcare executive Rick Jackson all announced bids for the Republican nomination. Jackson and Jones advanced to a runoff that took place on June 16, which Jackson won, thus becoming the Republican nominee.

On the Democratic side, former Mayor of Atlanta and former director of the White House Office of Public Engagement Keisha Lance Bottoms became the nominee on May 19 and defeated a crowded field, which included former state senator Jason Esteves, former DeKalb County Chief Executive Officer and 2010 nominee for U.S. Senate Mike Thurmond, and state representative Derrick Jackson. Former Lieutenant Governor Geoff Duncan, a Republican critic of Donald Trump, switched to the Democratic Party and ran for governor.

This race was expected to be highly competitive due to the state's nearly even partisan lean and Bottoms' perceived poor electability. Most polling showed the two candidates within the margin of error. However, in the midst of a historic Democratic wave nationwide, Keisha Lance Bottoms unexpectedly pulled away on election night and won by a comfortable 8.6% margin, much to her own surprise. Along with her victory, Democrats won every other statewide office in Georgia on the same ballot. Bottoms is the first woman and first African-American to be elected governor of Georgia. Bottoms will be the first African-American woman to be governor of any U.S. state. She is also the first Democrat to be elected governor of Georgia since Roy Barnes in 1998.

== Hawaii ==
Hawaii gubernatorial election
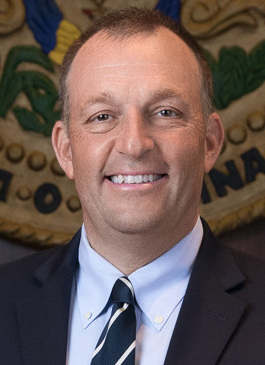

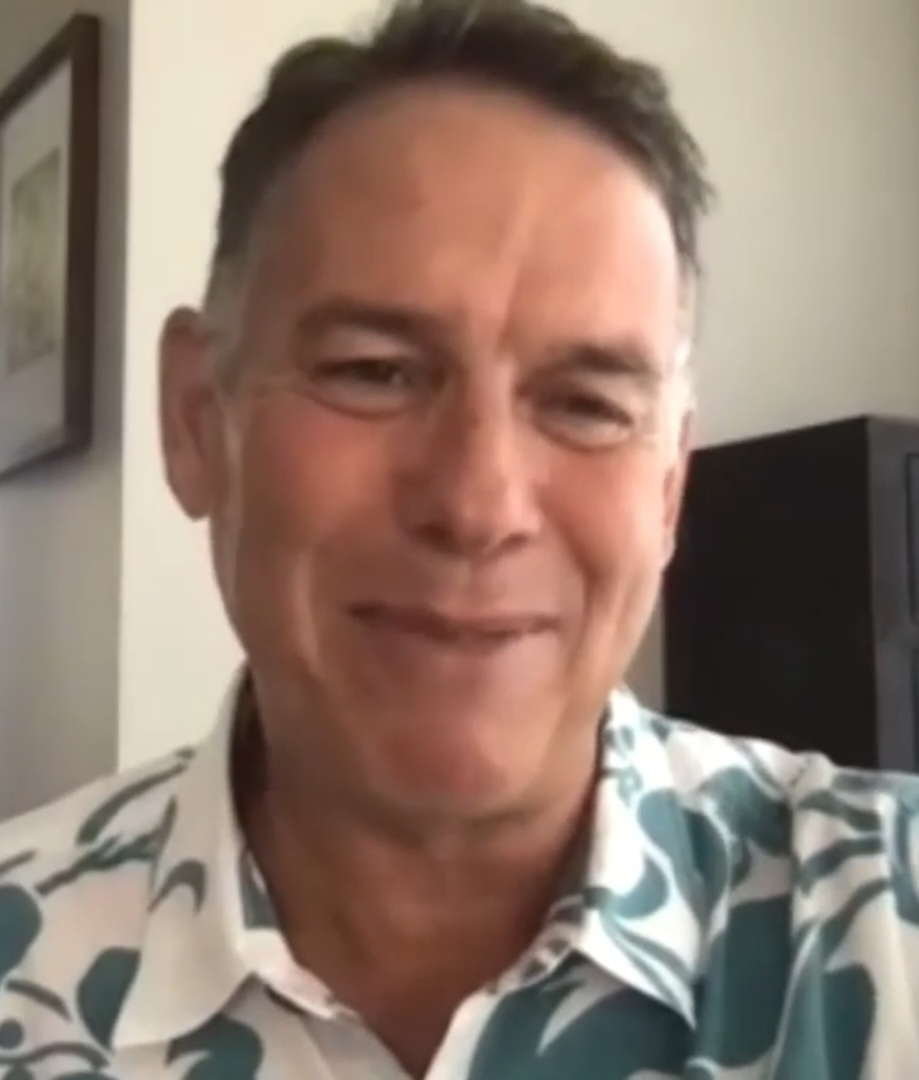
Nominee	Josh Green	Gary Cordery
Party	Democratic	Republican
Running mate	Derek Kawakami	Daniel Anthony
Popular vote	279,445	105,258
Percentage	72.64%	27.36%
- Green: 70–80% No data
Governor before election
Josh Green
Democratic
Elected Governor
Josh Green
Democratic

Governor Josh Green, a Democrat, was elected in 2022 with 63.2% of the vote. He won re-election to a second term by an even larger margin.

== Idaho ==
Idaho gubernatorial election
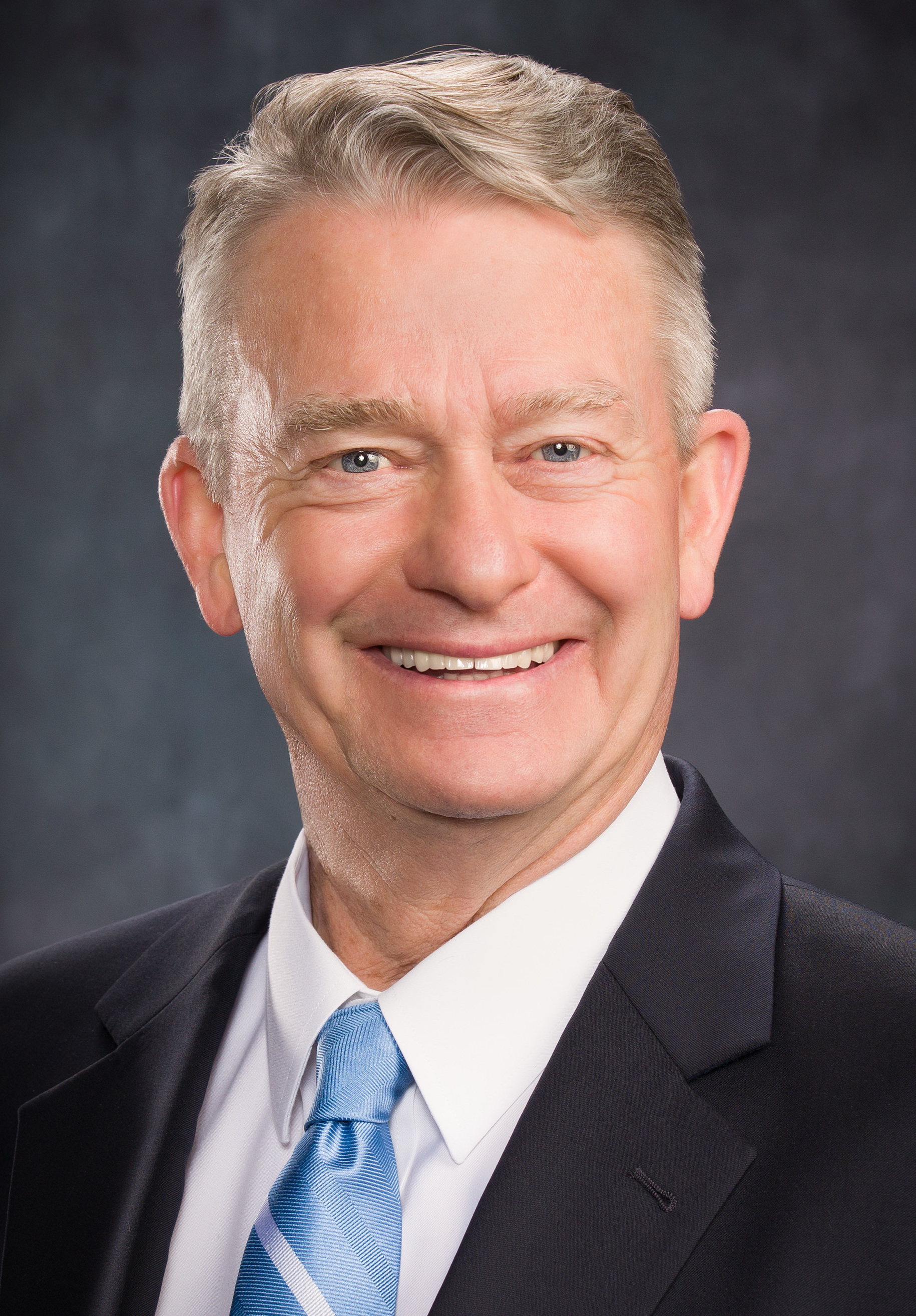

Nominee	Brad Little	Terri Pickens	John Stegner
Party	Republican	Democratic	Independent
Popular vote	407,263	230,770	75,582
Percentage	57.1%	32.3%	7.6%
- Little: 40–50% 50–60% 60–70% 70–80% 80–90% Pickens: 50–60% 60–70%
Governor before election
Brad Little
Republican
Elected Governor
Brad Little
Republican

Governor Brad Little, a Republican, was re-elected in 2022 with 60.5% of the vote. Because Idaho does not have gubernatorial term limits in its Constitution, he is running for re-election to a third term.

Attorney Terri Pickens, who was the Democratic nominee for lieutenant governor in 2022, is running for the Democratic gubernatorial nomination.

Former Republican John Stegner, a former justice of the Idaho Supreme Court, announced an independent campaign.

Little won re-election by a nearly 25-point margin.

== Illinois ==
Illinois gubernatorial election

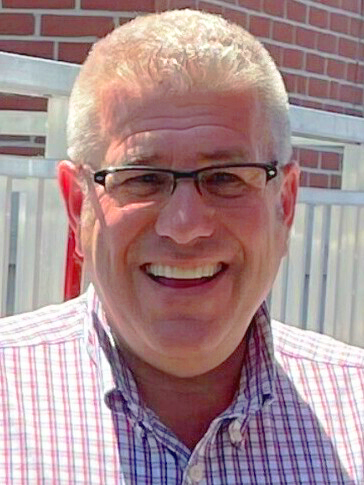
Nominee	JB Pritzker	Darren Bailey
Party	Democratic	Republican
Running mate	Christian Mitchell	Aaron Del Mar
Popular vote	2,458,101	1,495,629
Percentage	60.1%	36.6%
- Pritzker: 50–60% 60–70% 70–80% Bailey: 50–60% 60–70% 70–80% 80–90%
Governor before election
JB Pritzker
Democratic
Elected Governor
JB Pritzker
Democratic

Governor JB Pritzker, a Democrat, was re-elected in 2022 with 54.9% of the vote and is running for a third term. With Lieutenant Governor Juliana Stratton seeking Illinois's U.S. Senate seat in 2026, Pritzker's running mate is former state representative Christian Mitchell. Pritzker won the Democratic nomination unopposed.

On the Republican side, former state senator and 2022 Republican nominee for governor Darren Bailey secured the nomination against former vice president of policy for the Illinois Policy Institute Ted Dabrowski, DuPage County Sheriff James Mendrick, and real estate developer Rick Heidner.

The election was the first gubernatorial rematch in Illinois since 1986. In the general election, Pritzker won with approximately 60% of the vote, an improvement of five percentage points from 2022. This is the first time a Democratic candidate for governor has won 60% or more of the vote in Illinois, as well as the first time Sangamon County went for the Democratic candidate for governor since 1964, and the first time for McHenry County since 1852.

== Iowa ==
Iowa gubernatorial election
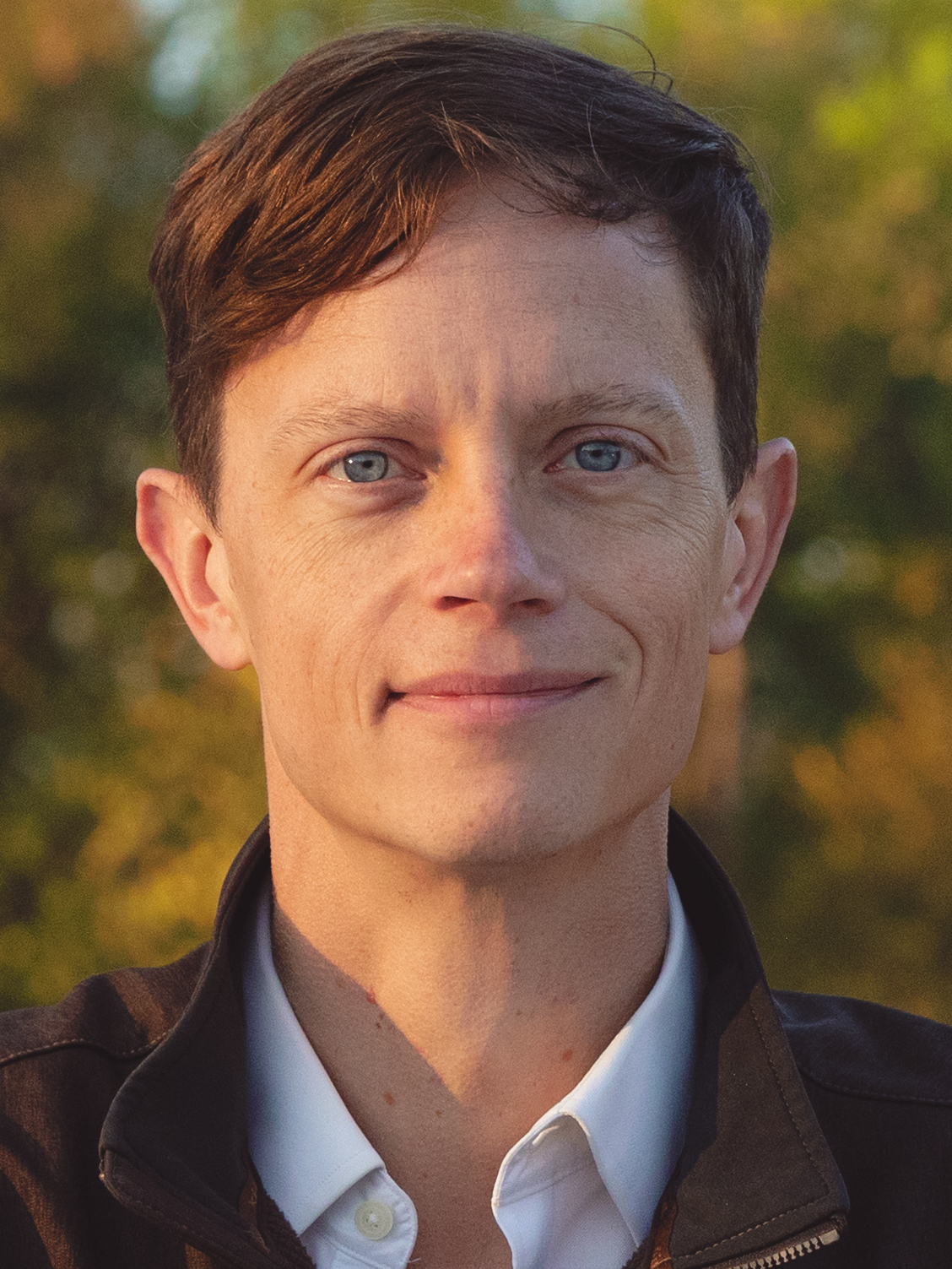

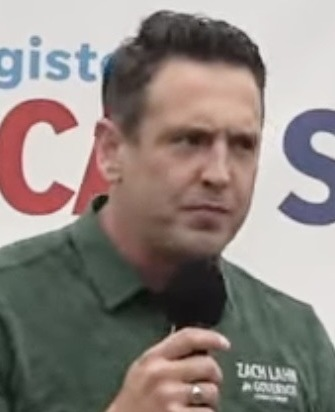
Nominee	Rob Sand	Zach Lahn
Party	Democratic	Republican
Running mate	Dave Muhlbauer	Derek Wulf
Popular vote	757,506	607,591
Percentage	55.5%	44.5%
- Sand: 50–60% 60–70% 70–80% Lahn: 40–50% 50–60% 60–70% 70–80%
Governor before election
Kim Reynolds
Republican
Elected Governor
Rob Sand
Democratic

Governor Kim Reynolds, a Republican, was re-elected in 2022 with 58.1% of the vote. While she is eligible to run for re-election to a third full term, she has decided not to run.

Republican candidates included state representative Eddie Andrews, U.S. Representative for Iowa's 4th congressional district Randy Feenstra, former director of the Iowa Department of Administrative Services Adam Steen, businessman Zach Lahn, and former state representative Brad Sherman. Zach Lahn won the nomination on June 2, in what was considered a major upset.

On the Democratic side, State Auditor Rob Sand declared his candidacy in May 2025 and won the nomination as the only candidate to file by the deadline. He was also the only Democratic statewide officeholder in Iowa. Sand defeated Lahn in the election to become the first Democratic governor in 20 years, the last being Chet Culver.

== Kansas ==
Kansas gubernatorial election

Nominee	Cindy Holscher	Ty Masterson
Party	Democratic	Republican
Running mate	KC Ohaebosim	Jeff Klemp
Popular vote	552,076	544,791
Percentage	50.3%	49.7%
- Holscher: 50–60% 60–70% 70–80% Masterson: 50–60% 60–70% 70–80% 80–90%
Governor before election
Laura Kelly
Democratic
Elected Governor
Cindy Holscher
Democratic

Governor Laura Kelly, a Democrat, was re-elected in 2022 with 49.5% of the vote. She will be term limited by the Kansas Constitution and cannot seek re-election to a third consecutive term.

State senators Ethan Corson and Cindy Holscher ran for the Democratic nomination, with Corson receiving Governor Kelly's endorsement. Holscher defeated Corson with 48.8% of the vote on August 4.

Candidates for the Republican nomination included State Senate President Ty Masterson, Kansas Insurance Commissioner Vicki Schmidt, Kansas Secretary of State Scott Schwab, and Johnson County Commissioner Charlotte O'Hara. Masterson won the Republican nomination on August 4 with 43.2% of the vote.

Holscher was declared the winner on November 12.

== Maine ==
Maine gubernatorial election
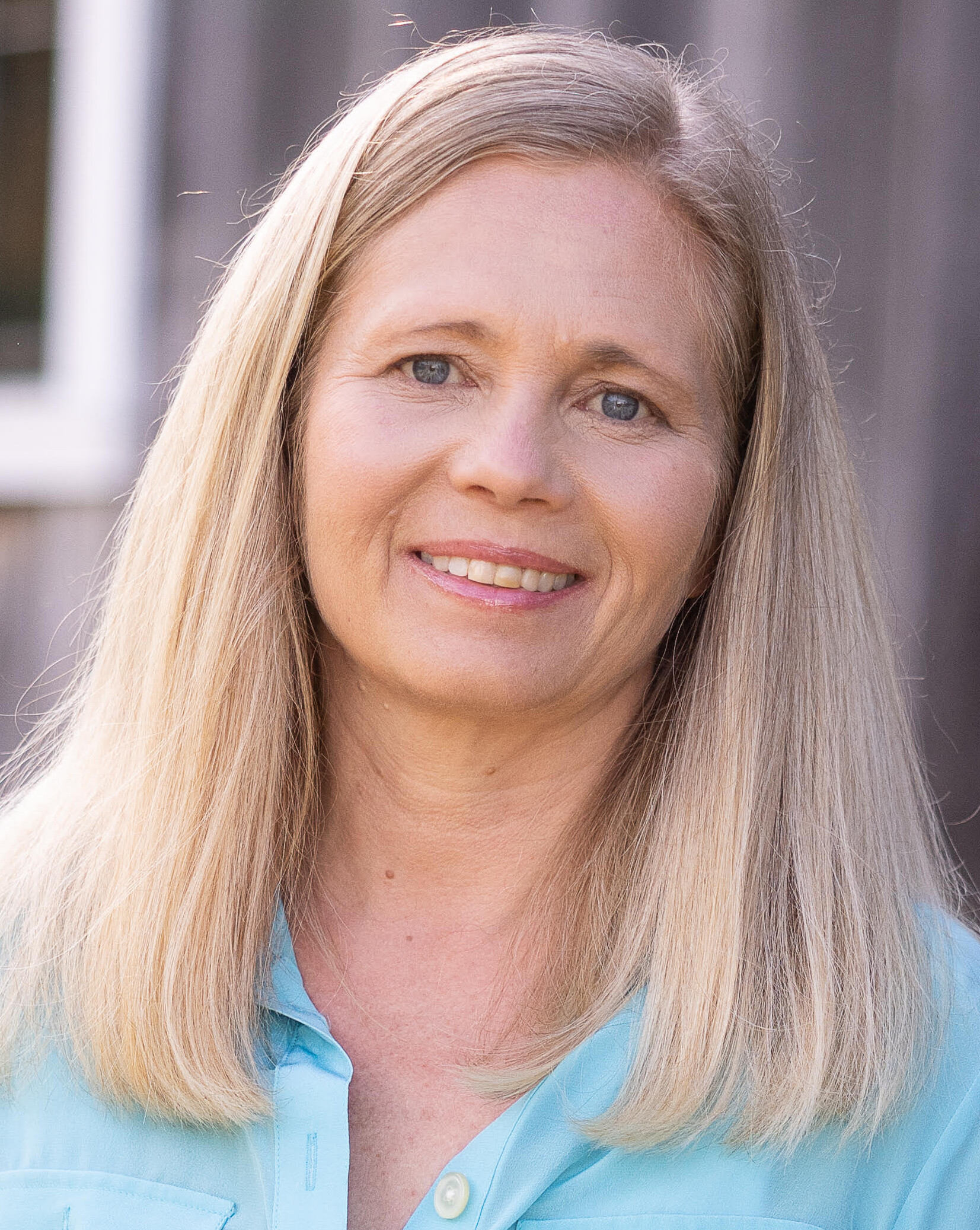

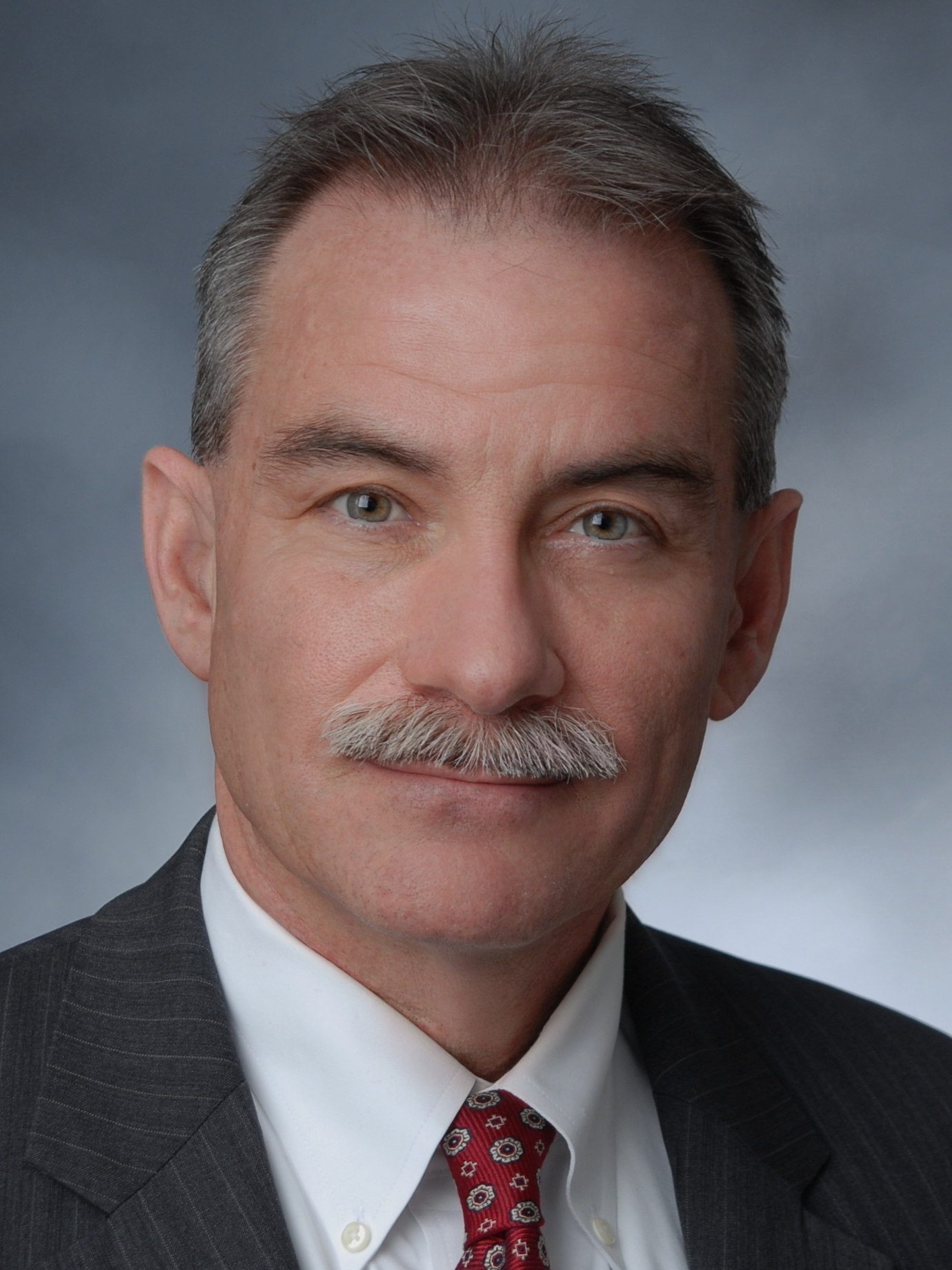

Nominee	Hannah Pingree	Robert B. Charles	Rick Bennett
Party	Democratic	Republican	Independent
Popular vote	387,226	265,982	57,478
Percentage	54.5%	37.4%	8.1%
- Pingree: 40–50% 50–60% 60–70% 70–80% 80–90% Charles: 40–50% 50–60% 60–70% 70–80% 80–90% 90–100% Tie: 40–50%
Governor before election
Janet Mills
Democratic
Elected Governor
Hannah Pingree
Democratic

Governor Janet Mills, a Democrat, was re-elected in 2022 with 55.4% of the vote. She will be term-limited by the Maine Constitution, and cannot seek re-election to a third consecutive term.

Former State House Speaker Hannah Pingree, the daughter of U.S. Representative Chellie Pingree defeated a crowded Democratic field, which included Secretary of State Shenna Bellows; former State Senate President Troy Jackson; businessman Angus King III, the son of independent U.S. Senator and former Maine governor Angus King; and former Centers for Disease Control and Prevention principal deputy director Dr. Nirav Shah.

On the Republican side, former U.S. Assistant Secretary of State Robert Charles defeated a field which included healthcare executive and member of the Bush family Jonathan Bush; real estate businessman David Jones; state senator and candidate for governor in 2002 James Libby; former Maine Senate majority leader and candidate for governor in 2018 Garrett Mason; entrepreneur Owen McCarthy; businessman Ben Midgley; and former Paris selectman Robert Wessels.

Pingree and Charles were joined on the ballot by independent state senator Rick Bennett, who left the Republican Party shortly before launching his campaign. Pingree defeated Charles and Bennett, becoming the first governor since Burton M. Cross, elected in 1952, to succeed a governor from the same party.

== Maryland ==
Maryland gubernatorial election

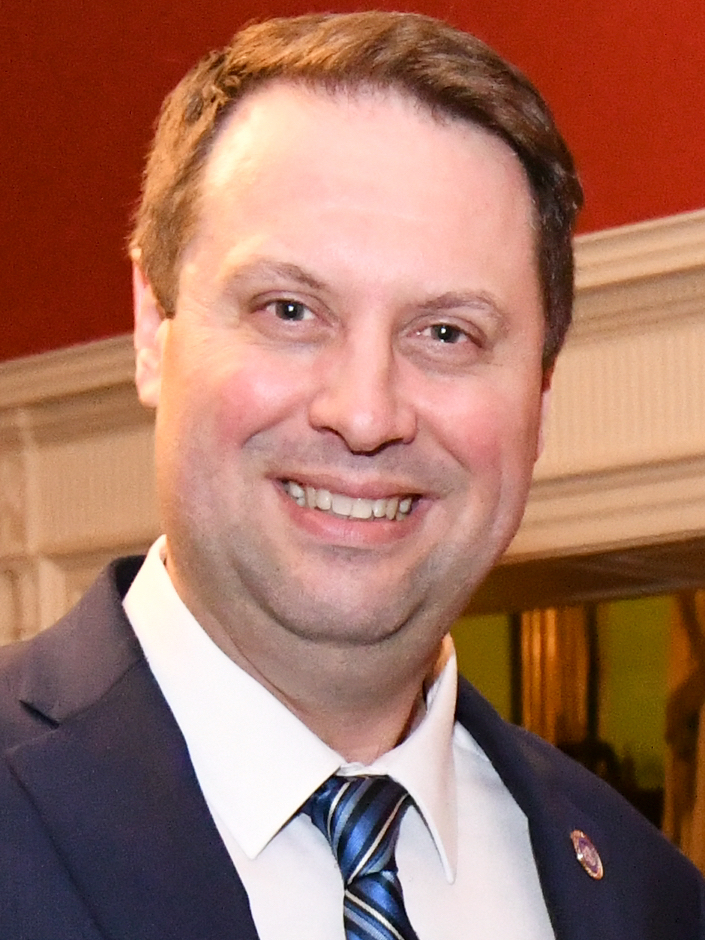
Nominee	Wes Moore	Dan Cox
Party	Democratic	Republican
Running mate	Aruna Miller	Robert Krop
Popular vote	1,468,655	683,520
Percentage	65.3%	30.4%
- Moore: 50–60% 60–70% 70–80% 80–90% Cox: 40–50% 50–60% 60–70% 70–80%
Governor before election
Wes Moore
Democratic
Elected Governor
Wes Moore
Democratic

Governor Wes Moore, a Democrat, was elected in 2022 with 64.5% of the vote. He is running for re-election to a second term. Moore easily defeated physician Eric Felber in the Democratic primary.

A number of Republicans are vying for the party's nomination: businessman Carl Brunner, former state delegate and 2022 nominee Dan Cox, businessman Ed Hale, and John Myrick, a candidate for U.S. Senate in 2024, have announced their candidacies for governor. Cox became the Republican nominee on June 23, creating the first gubernatorial rematch in the state since 2010.

Moore defeated Cox by a 65.1%–30.5% margin.

== Massachusetts ==
Massachusetts gubernatorial election
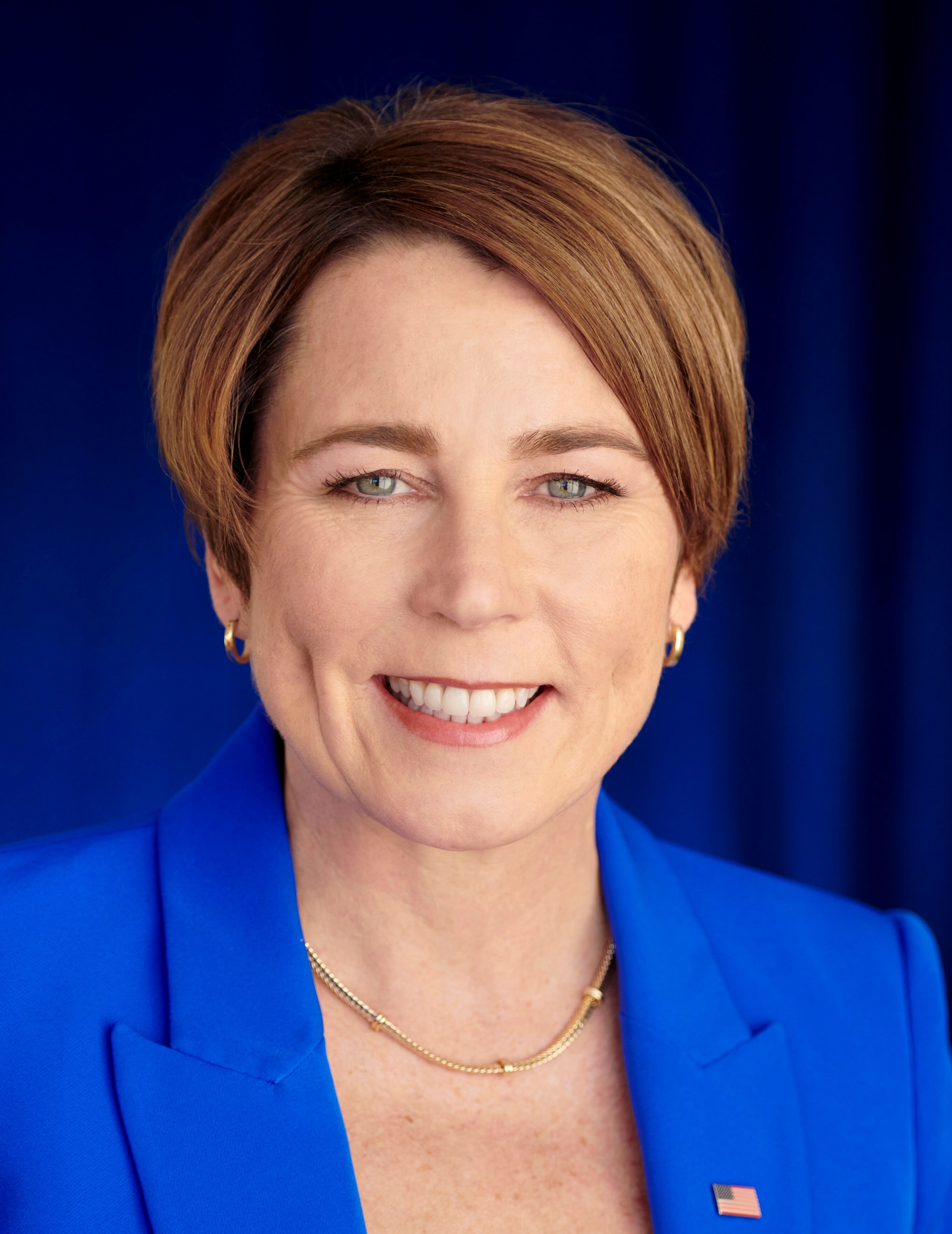

Nominee	Maura Healey	Michael Minogue
Party	Democratic	Republican
Running mate	Kim Driscoll	Shawn Oliver
Popular vote	1,625,487	911,234
Percentage	62.0%	34.7%
- Healey: 40–50% 50–60% 60–70% 70–80% 80–90% >90% Minogue: 40–50% 50–60% 60–70%
Governor before election
Maura Healey
Democratic
Elected Governor
Maura Healey
Democratic

Governor Maura Healey, a Democrat, was elected in 2022 with 63.7% of the vote. Healey is running for re-election for a second term in office.

On the Republican side, businessman Mike Minogue defeated former chief administrator and acting general manager of the Massachusetts Bay Transportation Authority Brian Shortsleeve on September 1, 2026.

Healey defeated Minogue by over 27 points.

== Michigan ==
Michigan gubernatorial election
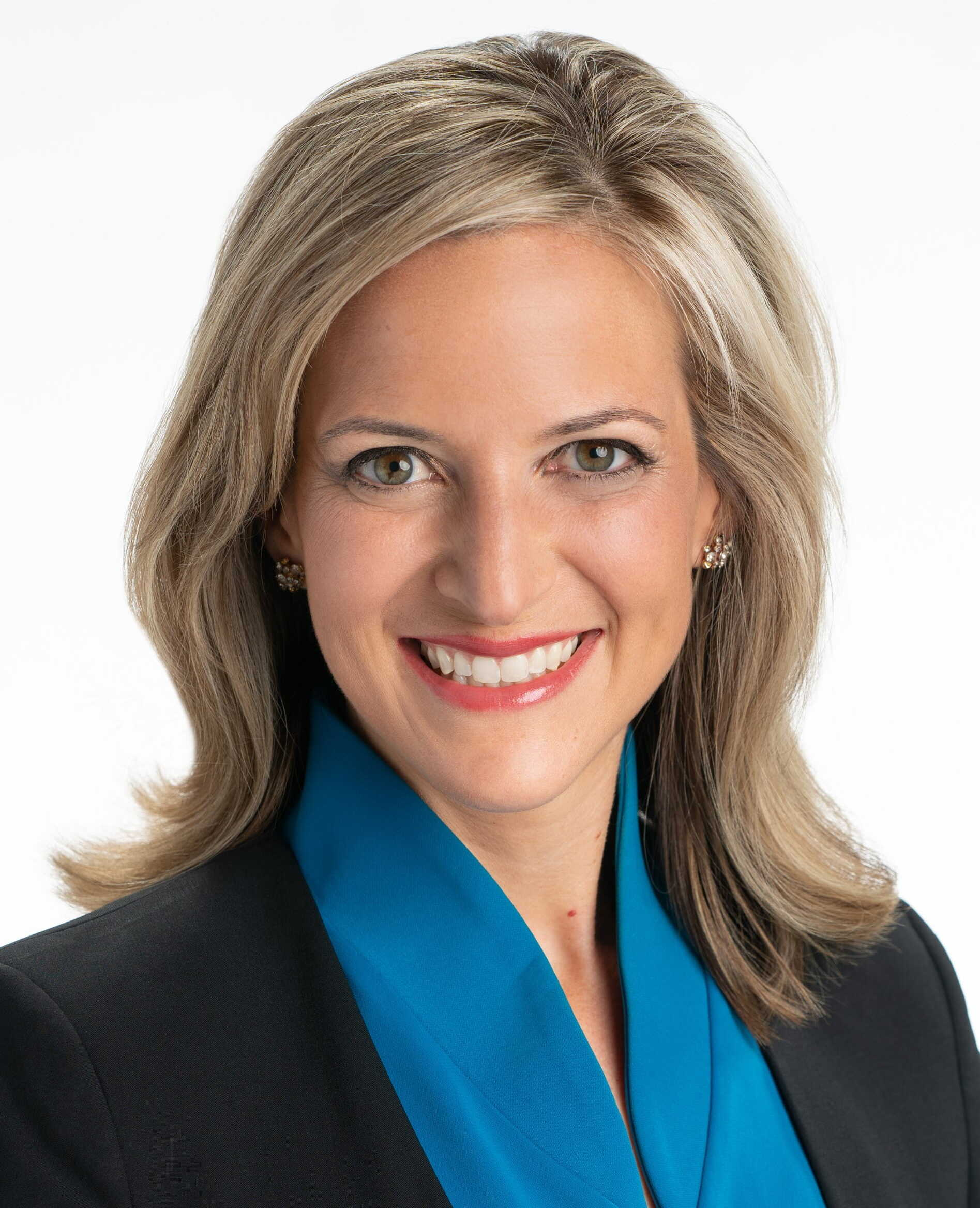

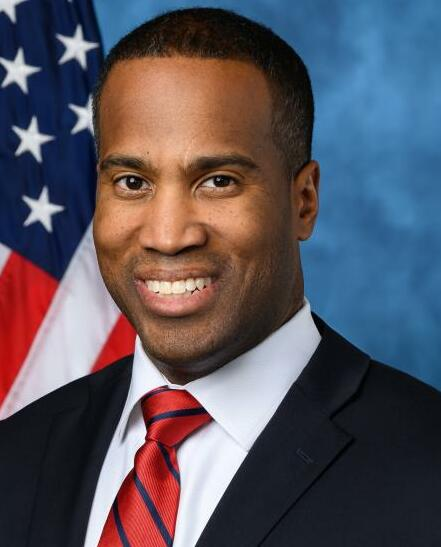
Nominee	Jocelyn Benson	John James
Party	Democratic	Republican
Running mate	Winnie Brinks	Jay DeBoyer
Popular vote	2,613,747	2,094,689
Percentage	54.6%	43.7%
- Benson: 40–50% 50–60% 60–70% 70–80% James: 40–50% 50–60% 60–70% 70–80%
Governor before election
Gretchen Whitmer
Democratic
Elected Governor
Jocelyn Benson
Democratic

Democratic Governor Gretchen Whitmer was re-elected in 2022 with 54.5% of the vote. She is term-limited by the Michigan Constitution in 2026 and cannot seek re-election to a third term.

Secretary of State Jocelyn Benson and Genessee County Sheriff Chris Swanson announced campaigns for the Democratic nomination. Benson easily defeated Swanson with 83.2% of the vote on August 4 and became the Democratic nominee.

Businessman, 2022 candidate for governor and 2024 candidate for president Perry Johnson; and U.S. Representative for Michigan's 10th congressional district and nominee for U.S. Senate in 2018 and 2020 John James announced bids for the Republican nomination. James defeated Johnson with 50.1% of the vote on August 4.

Detroit mayor Mike Duggan, a former Democrat, announced his intention to run for governor as an independent in December 2024. He suspended his campaign in May 2026.

Benson defeated James by more than 10 points.

== Minnesota ==
Minnesota gubernatorial election
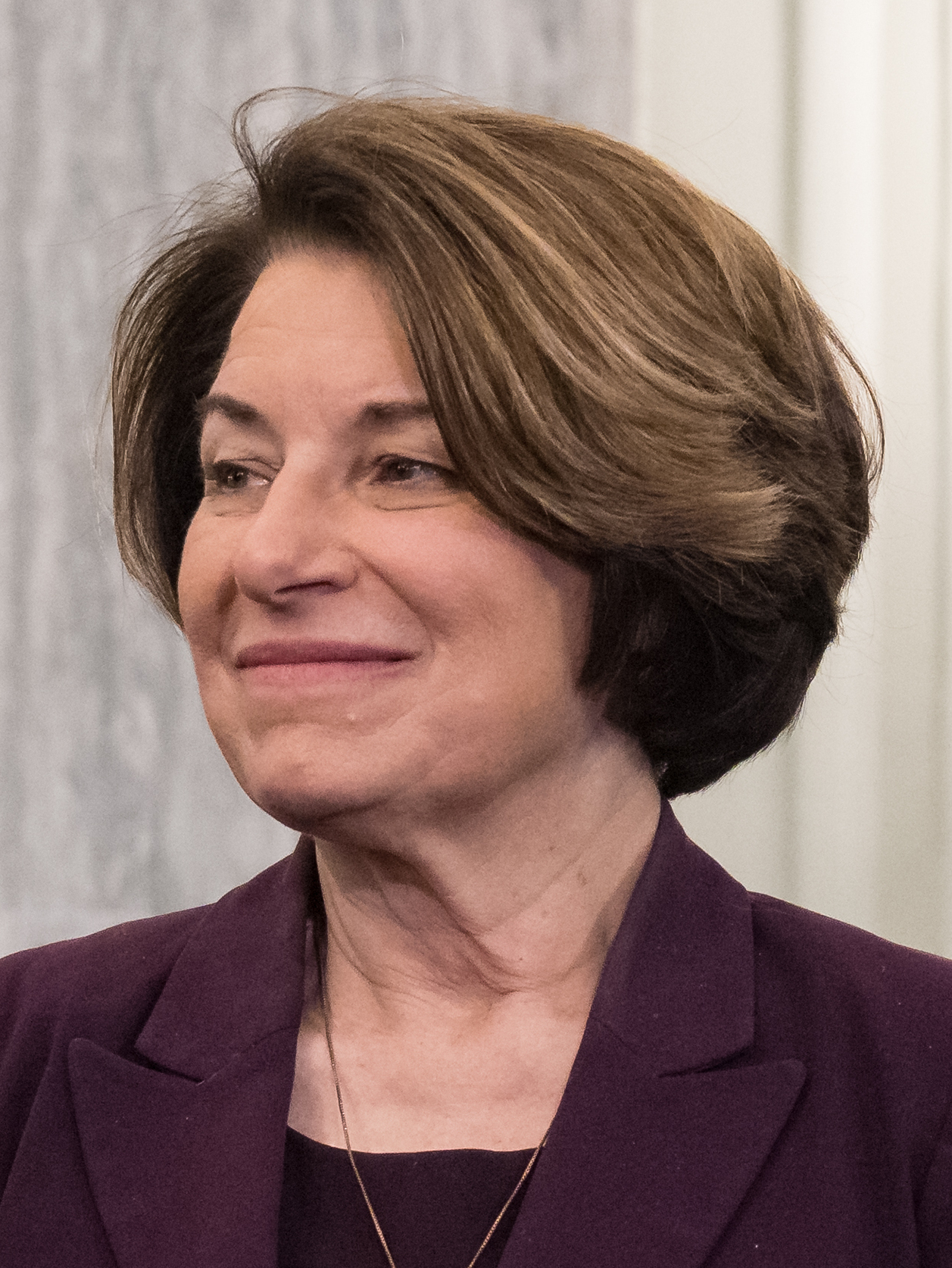

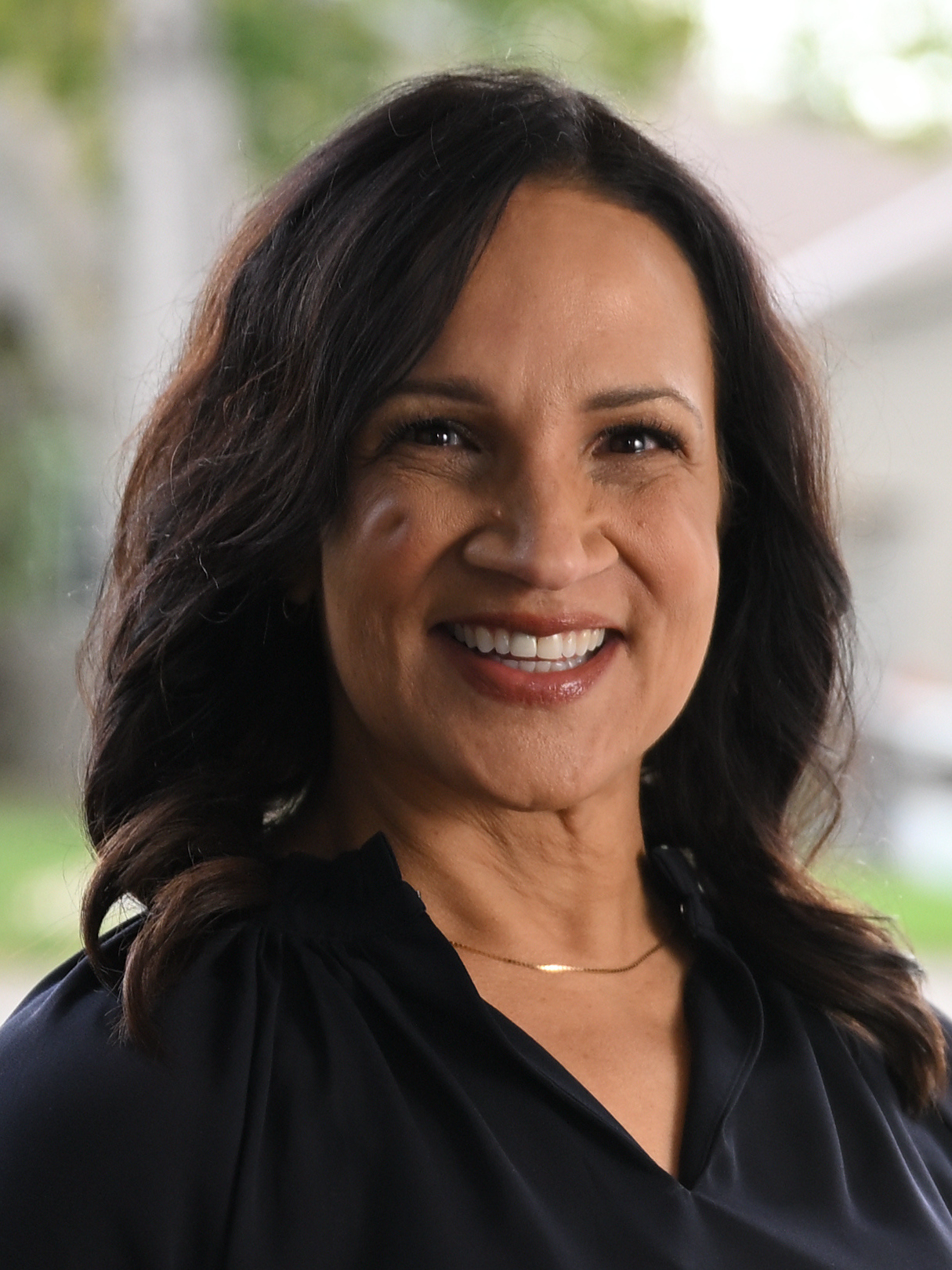
Nominee	Amy Klobuchar	Lisa Demuth
Party	Democratic (DFL)	Republican
Running mate	Ben Schierer	Ryan Wilson
Popular vote	1,569,698	1,206,583
Percentage	55.5%	42.6%
- Klobuchar: 40–50% 50–60% 60–70% 70–80% 80–90% >90% Demuth: 40–50% 50–60% 60–70% 70–80% 80–90% >90% Tie: 40–50% 50% No votes
Governor before election
Tim Walz
Democratic (DFL)
Elected Governor
Amy Klobuchar
Democratic (DFL)

Governor Tim Walz, a Democrat, was re-elected in 2022 with 52.3% of the vote. He initially announced a campaign for a third term, but later withdrew his candidacy in January 2026. Minnesota does not have gubernatorial term limits in its Constitution. Since the adoption of four-year terms in 1962, (Note: via Constitutional referendum in 1958) no Minnesota governor has won a third term.

Following Walz's announcement of not seeking re-election, U.S. Senator Amy Klobuchar announced a campaign on January 29, 2026. Several other Democratic-Farmer-Labor (DFL) candidates filed, none of whom have previously held elected offices in the state. Community organizer Kobey Layne positioned herself as the Progressive candidate and challenged Klobuchar for the DFL's endorsement, but Klobuchar was endorsed in the first ballot alongside her running mate Ben Schierer. Klobuchar then went on to win the Democratic nomination on August 11.

Republican candidates included State House Speaker Lisa Demuth, My Pillow CEO and conservative activist Mike Lindell, and healthcare technology executive Kendall Qualls. Qualls received the Republican Party's endorsement after ten rounds of balloting. Demuth went on to win the Republican nomination, defeating both Lindell and Qualls.

Klobuchar defeated Demuth by 13 points, becoming the first female governor of Minnesota. Republicans have not won a gubernatorial election in Minnesota since 2006. Although this was Klobuchar's narrowest victory in any of her statewide campaigns, she won by the largest margin in a Minnesota gubernatorial election since 1994, and by the largest margin for a non-incumbent candidate since 1982.

== Nebraska ==
Nebraska gubernatorial election
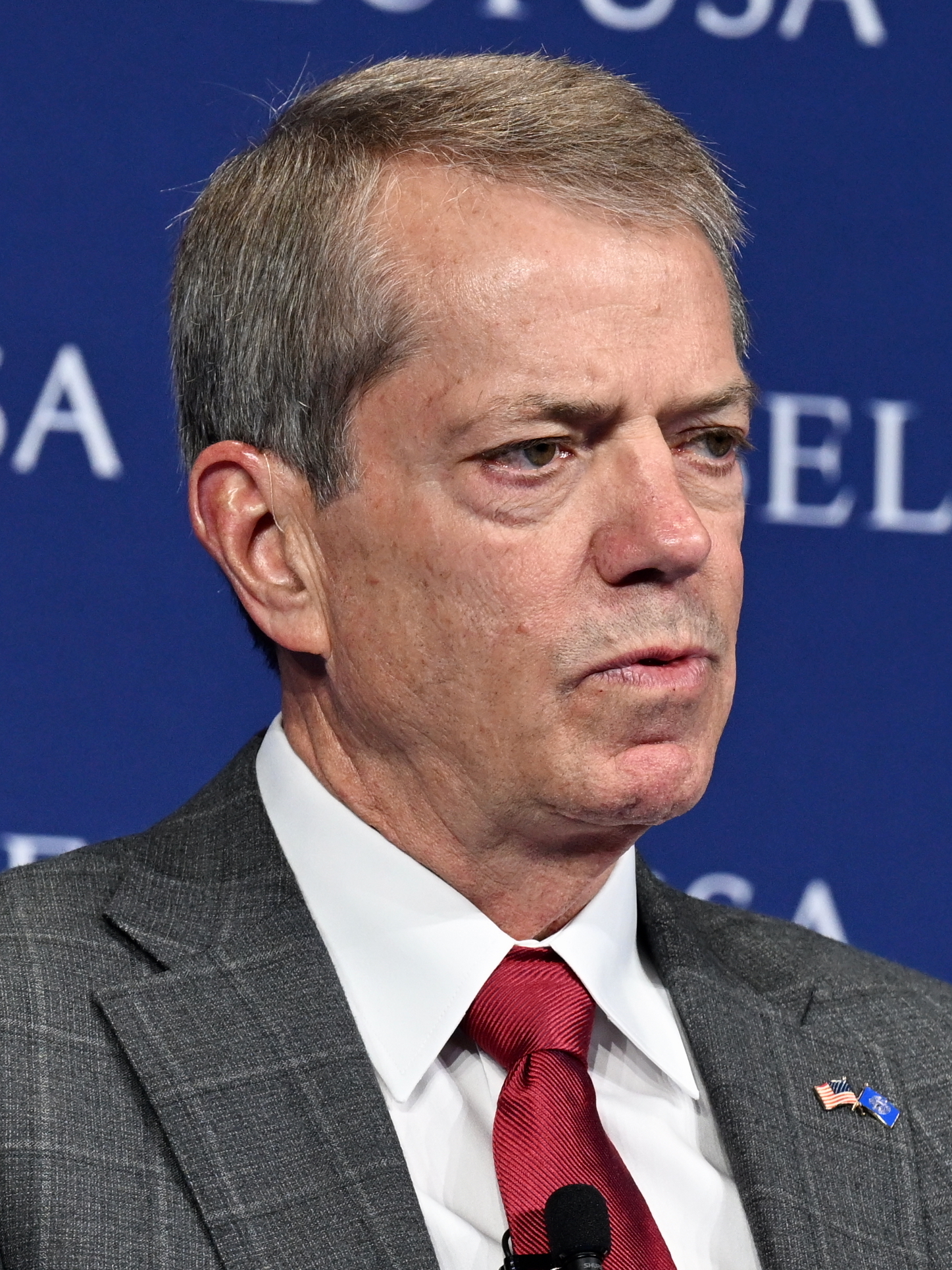

Nominee	Jim Pillen	Lynne Walz
Party	Republican	Democratic
Running mate	Joe Kelly	Ben Steffen
Popular vote	381,371	321,162
Percentage	50.5%	42.5%
- Pillen: 40–50% 50–60% 60–70% 70–80% 80–90% Walz: 40–50% 50–60%
Governor before election
Jim Pillen
Republican
Elected Governor
Jim Pillen
Republican

Governor Jim Pillen, a Republican, was elected in 2022 with 59.7% of the vote. He is running for re-election to a second term. He faced some challenges in the Republican primary, including medicinal cannabis activist Jacy Todd.

Former state senator and 2018 Democratic nominee for lieutenant governor Lynne Walz is the Democratic nominee.

Pillen won re-election over Walz by eight points, the best performance for a Democrat in a Nebraska gubernatorial election since 1994, which was also the most recent time that Democrats won a gubernatorial election in Nebraska. This was also the closest gubernatorial election in Nebraska since 1990.

== Nevada ==
Nevada gubernatorial election
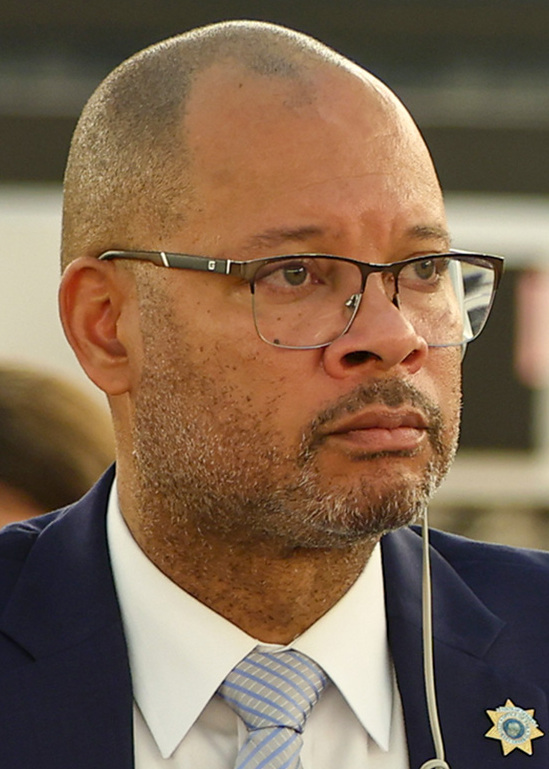

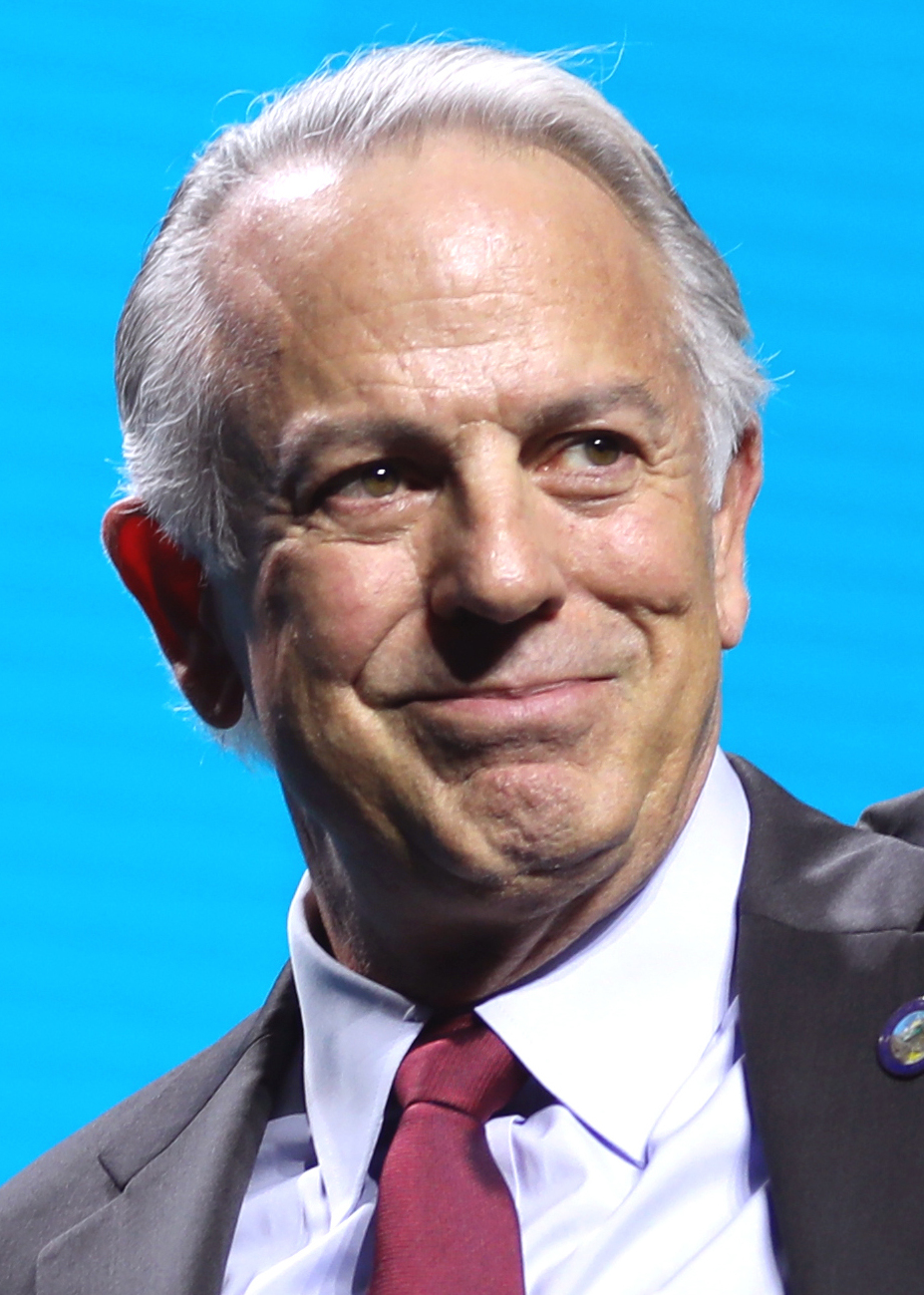
Nominee	Aaron Ford	Joe Lombardo
Party	Democratic	Republican
Popular vote	562,396	479,571
Percentage	51.6%	44.0%
- County results Ford: 50–60% Lombardo: 50–60% 60–70% 70–80% 80-90%
Governor before election
Joe Lombardo
Republican
Elected Governor
Aaron Ford
Democratic

Governor Joe Lombardo, a Republican, was elected in 2022 with 48.8% of the vote and is running for re-election to a second term in office. Businesswoman Irina Hansen, who ran for Mayor of Las Vegas in 2024, challenged Lombardo in the GOP primary. Lombardo easily defeated Hansen with over 90% of the vote on June 9 and became the Republican nominee.

State attorney general Aaron D. Ford defeated Washoe County Commissioner Alexis Hill for the Democratic nomination.

Ford defeated Lombardo by about seven points. Lombardo is the second consecutive governor of Nevada to lose re-election after Steve Sisolak in 2022. Ford became Nevada's first African American governor and the first Black person elected governor of a U.S. state west of the Mississippi River. Lombardo was one of two Republican governors to lose re-election in 2026, the other one being Greg Abbott in Texas.

== New Hampshire ==
New Hampshire gubernatorial election

Nominee	Kelly Ayotte	Cinde Warmington
Party	Republican	Democratic
Popular vote	324,410	297,339
Percentage	51.4%	47.1%
- Ayotte: 40–50% 50–60% 60–70% Warmington: 40–50% 50–60% 60–70% 70–80% 80–90%
Governor before election
Kelly Ayotte
Republican
Elected Governor
Kelly Ayotte
Republican

Governor Kelly Ayotte, a Republican, was elected in 2024 with 53.6% of the vote. She won renomination for a second two-year term in 2026.

Former executive councilor Cinde Warmington, who unsuccessfully sought the Democratic nomination in 2024, won the Democratic nomination.

Businessman Jon Kiper is running as the nominee of the newly formed Community First party.

Ayotte won re-election to a second term by just over four points.

== New Mexico ==
New Mexico gubernatorial election
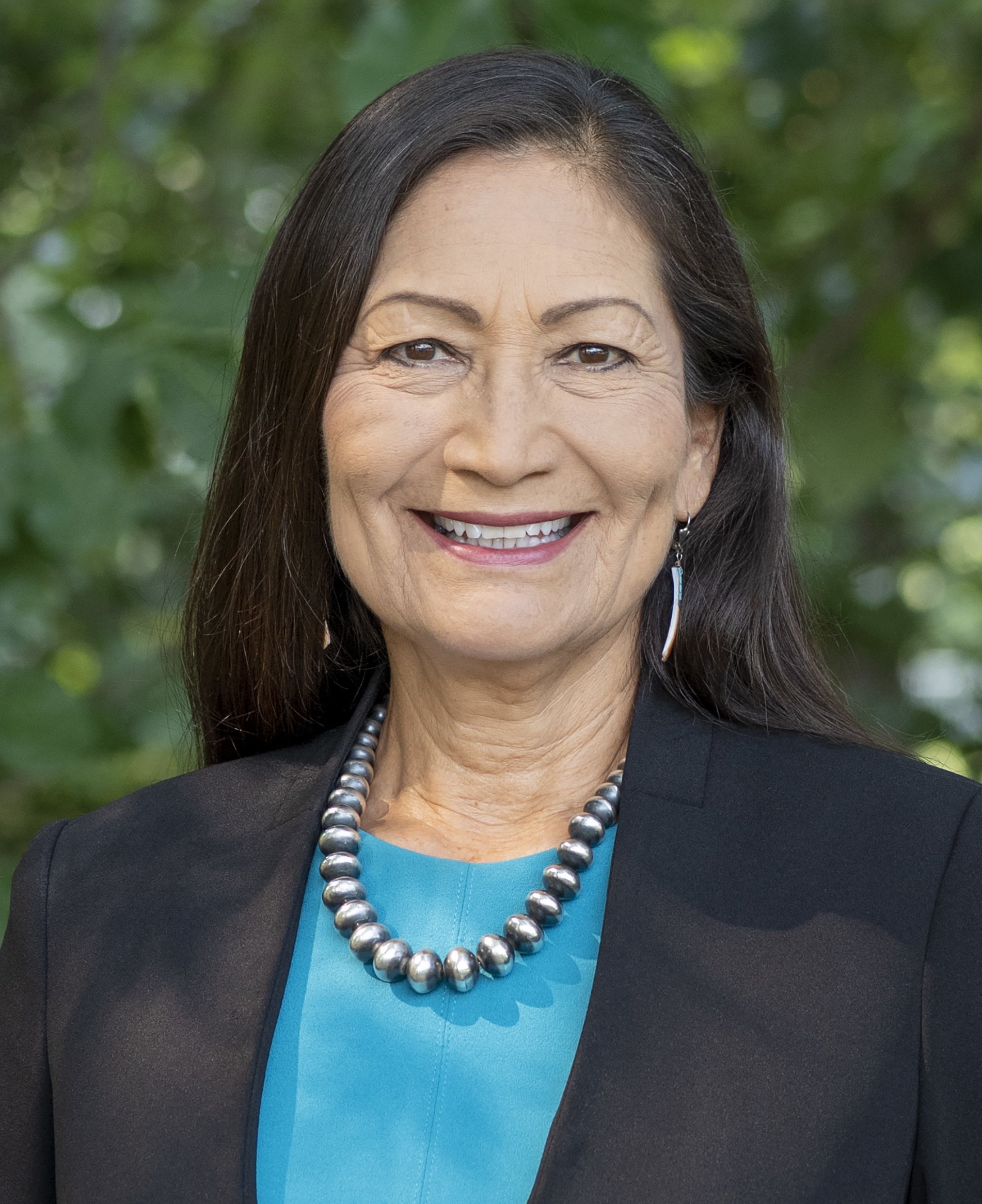

Nominee	Deb Haaland	Gregg Hull
Party	Democratic	Republican
Running mate	Stephanie Garcia Richard	David Gallegos
Popular vote	416,176	309,436
Percentage	57.4%	42.6%
- County results Haaland: 50–60% 60–70% 70–80% Hull: 50–60% 60–70% 70–80%
Governor before election
Michelle Lujan Grisham
Democratic
Elected Governor
Deb Haaland
Democratic

Governor Michelle Lujan Grisham, a Democrat, was re-elected in 2022 with 52.0% of the vote. She will be term-limited by the New Mexico Constitution in 2026 and cannot seek re-election to a third consecutive term.

Former U.S. Secretary of the Interior and U.S. Representative Deb Haaland defeated Bernalillo County District Attorney Sam Bregman to win the Democratic nomination on June 2.

Rio Rancho mayor Gregg Hull won the Republican nomination defeating former secretary of the New Mexico Human Services Department Duke Rodriguez and businessman Doug Turner.

Haaland defeated Hull by just over 14 points, becoming the first female Native American governor in American history.

== New York ==
New York gubernatorial election

Nominee	Kathy Hochul	Bruce Blakeman
Party	Democratic	Republican
Alliance	Working Families	Parties: Conservative; Vote Affordable
Running mate	Adrienne Adams	Todd Hood
Popular vote	3,641,811	2,442,748
Percentage	59.7%	40.1%
- Hochul: 40–50% 50–60% 70–80% 80–90% >90% Blakeman: 40–50% 50–60% 60–70% 70–80%
Governor before election
Kathy Hochul
Democratic
Elected Governor
Kathy Hochul
Democratic

Incumbent Democratic governor Kathy Hochul is running for re-election to a second full term. Primary elections took place on June 23, 2026. The gubernatorial candidates selected their running mates, instead of having separate primaries.

Hochul will face Nassau County executive Bruce Blakeman, the Republican nominee, in the general election. After U.S. representative Elise Stefanik withdrew from the Republican primary in December 2025, Blakeman was endorsed by President Donald Trump. Republicans have not won a statewide election in New York since George Pataki was re-elected governor in 2002.

Hochul won re-election to a second full term by 19 points.

== Ohio ==
Ohio gubernatorial election
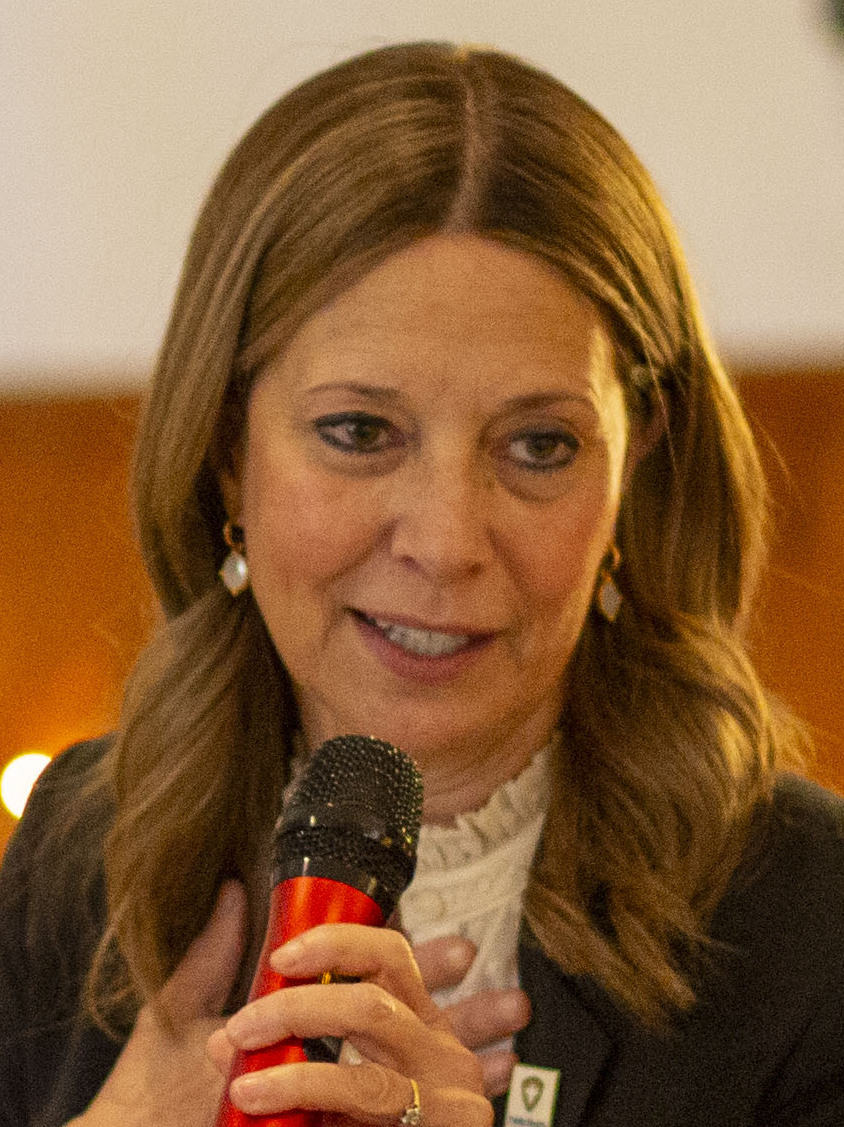

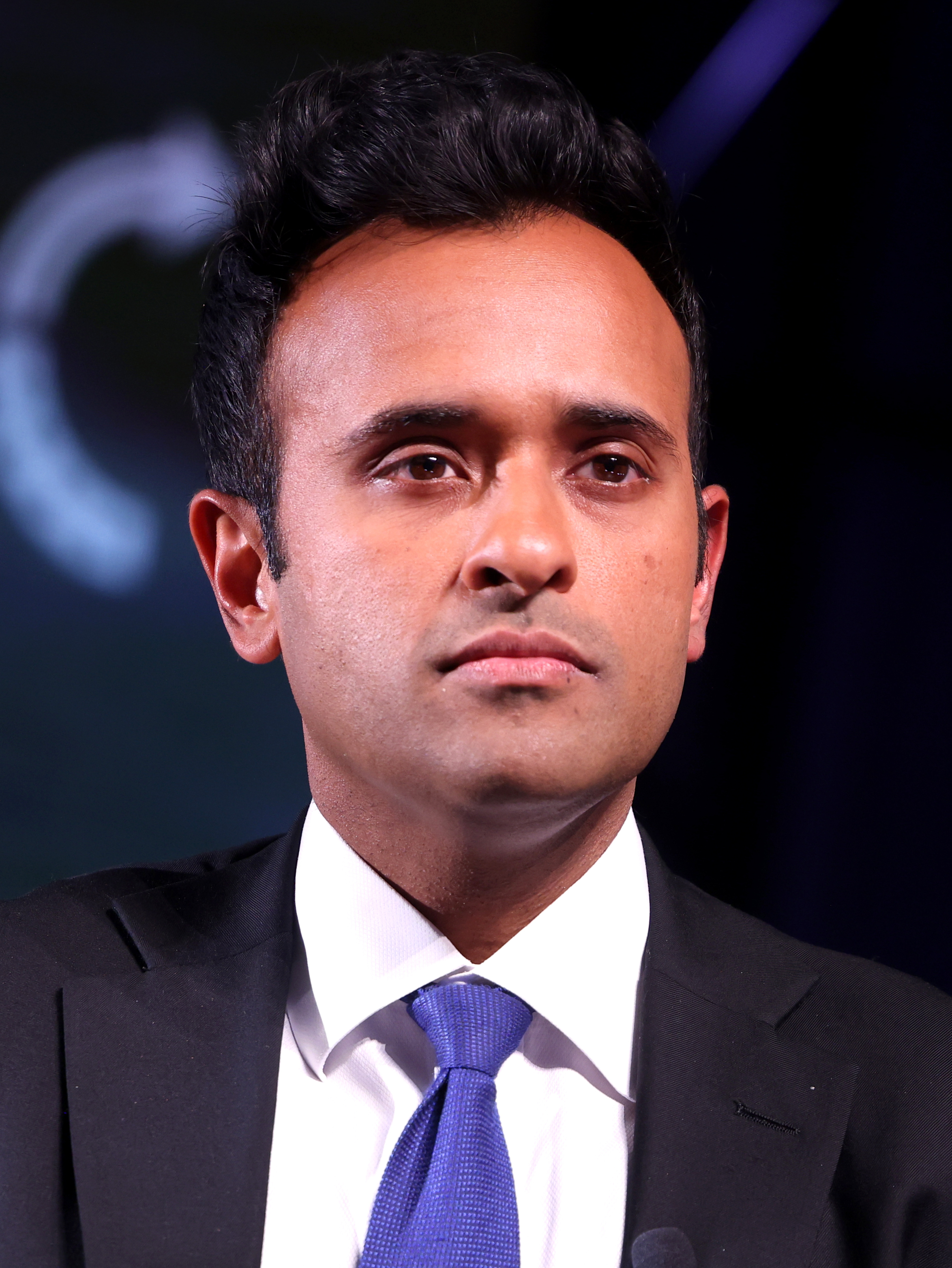
Nominee	Amy Acton	Vivek Ramaswamy
Party	Democratic	Republican
Running mate	David Pepper	Rob McColley
Popular vote	2,404,178	2,039,730
Percentage	52.3%	44.4%
- Acton: 40–50% 50–60% 60–70% 70–80% Ramaswamy: 40–50% 50–60% 60–70% 70–80%
Governor before election
Mike DeWine
Republican
Elected Governor
Amy Acton
Democratic

Governor Mike DeWine, a Republican, was re-elected in 2022 with 62.4% of the vote. He was term-limited by the Ohio Constitution in 2026 and could not seek re-election to a third consecutive term.

On the Republican side, biotech entrepreneur and former candidate for the Republican Party nomination in the 2024 presidential election Vivek Ramaswamy announced a campaign, which won the support of President Trump and Ohioan Vice President Vance. Ohio Attorney General Dave Yost, who announced his candidacy for governor in January 2025, withdrew from the race and endorsed Ramaswamy in May 2025. Ramaswamy defeated automotive entrepreneur Casey Putsch in the Republican primary on May 5, 2026.

Former Ohio Department of Health Director Dr. Amy Acton is the Democratic nominee, as no other candidate filed by the February 4, 2026 deadline.

After a campaign described as "bitter" by the BBC, Amy Acton won the election by an 8% margin. This is the first time Democrats have won a gubernatorial election in Ohio since 2006.

== Oklahoma ==
Oklahoma gubernatorial election
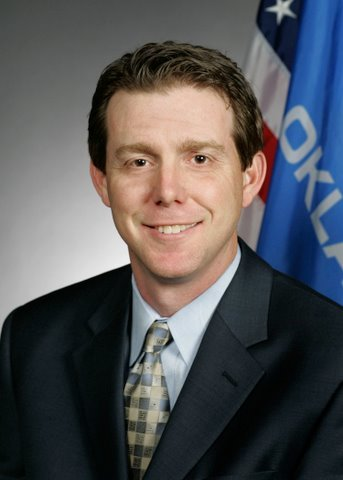

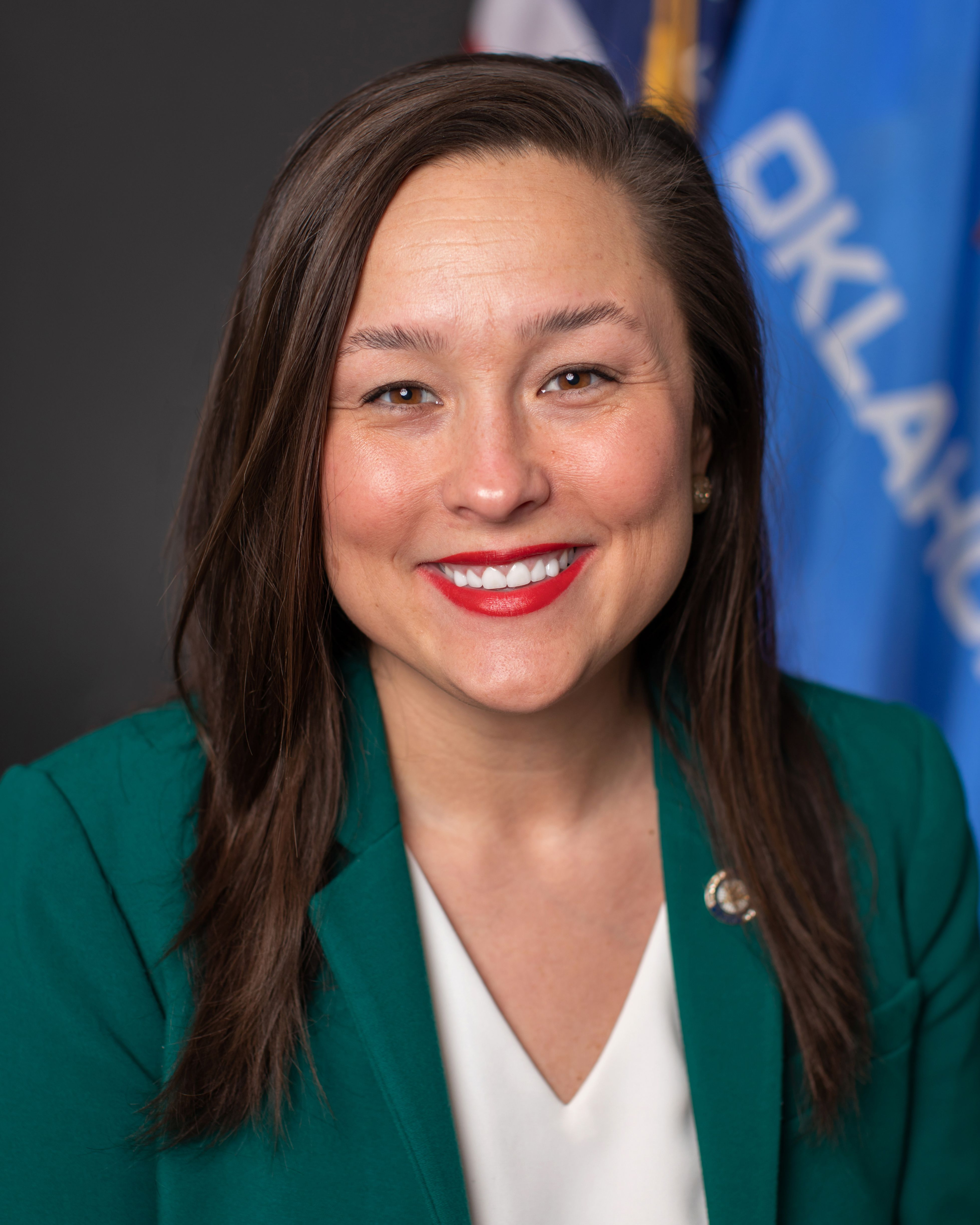
Nominee	Mike Mazzei	Cyndi Munson
Party	Republican	Democratic
Popular vote	581,706	514,342
Percentage	51.9%	45.9%
- Mazzei: 40–50% 50–60% 60–70% 70–80% 80–90% >90% Munson: 40–50% 50–60% 60–70% 70–80% 80–90% >90% Tie: 40–50% 50% No votes
Governor before election
Kevin Stitt
Republican
Elected Governor
Mike Mazzei
Republican

Governor Kevin Stitt, a Republican, was re-elected in 2022 with 55.4% of the vote. He will be term-limited by the Oklahoma Constitution in 2026 and cannot seek re-election to a third term.

Attorney General Gentner Drummond, former Oklahoma Secretary of Budget Mike Mazzei, former Speaker of the Oklahoma House of Representatives Charles McCall, former Oklahoma Secretary of Public Safety Chip Keating, who is the son of former governor Frank Keating, and former state senator Jake A. Merrick all ran for the Republican nomination. Drummond and Mazzei advanced to a runoff, which took place on August 25. Mazzei narrowly defeated Drummond with 50.3% of the vote to become the Republican nominee.

State representative Cyndi Munson defeated securities trader Arya Azma for the Democratic nomination.

Mazzei defeated Munson by six points. This was the best performance for a Democrat in a gubernatorial election in Oklahoma since 2006, which was the last time a Democrat won, and the closest election since 2002.

== Oregon ==
Oregon gubernatorial election
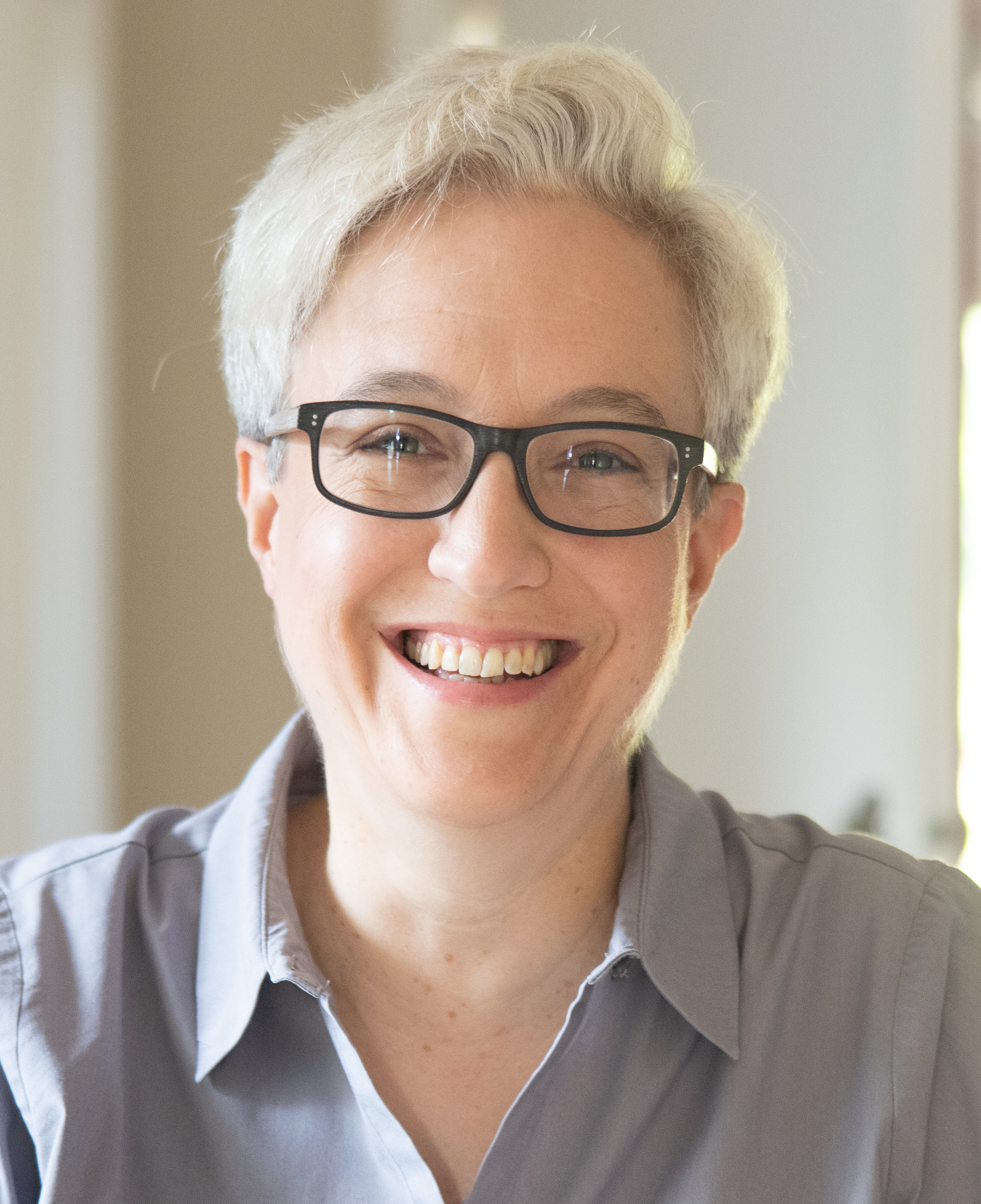

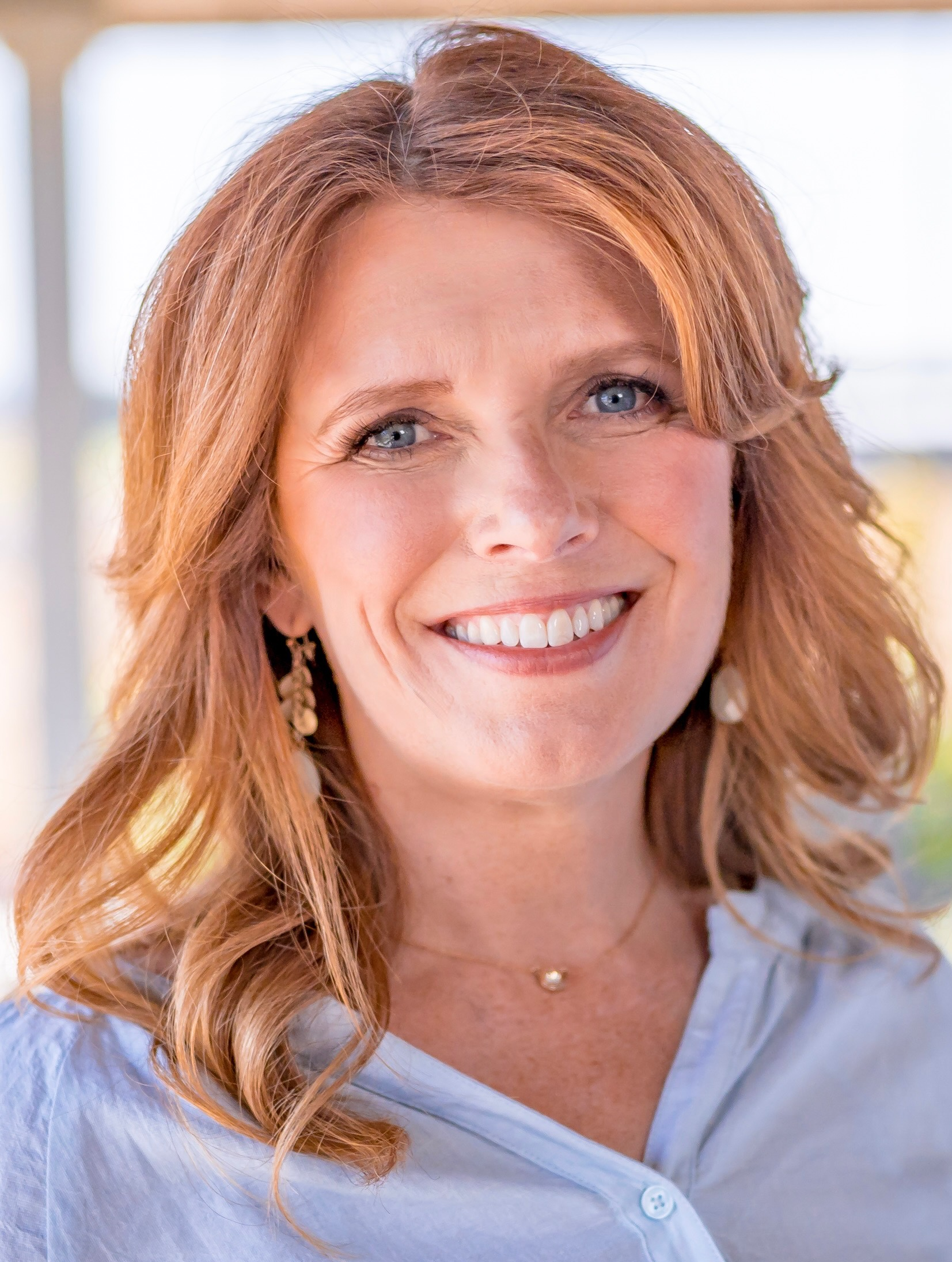
Nominee	Tina Kotek	Christine Drazan
Party	Democratic	Republican
Alliance	Working Families	Libertarian
Popular vote	1,000,012	819,566
Percentage	53.3%	43.7%
- County results Kotek: 40–50% 50–60% 60–70% 70–80% Drazan: 50–60% 60–70% 70–80% 80–90%
Governor before election
Tina Kotek
Democratic
Elected Governor
Tina Kotek
Democratic

Governor Tina Kotek, a Democrat, was elected in 2022 with 47% of the vote. She is running for re-election to a second term.

On the Republican side, former minority leader of the Oregon House of Representatives and 2022 nominee for governor Christine Drazan defeated a field that included former professional basketball player and 2010 nominee Chris Dudley, state representative Ed Diehl, Marion County commissioner Danielle Bethell, geonomics researcher Kyle Duyck, and candidate for Oregon Commissioner of Labor in 2022 Robert Neuman.

Kotek won re-election by approximately 10 points, based on unofficial results. While Democrats have won every gubernatorial election in Oregon since 1982, only one of these victories, in 1998, has been by a margin greater than 10 points. Kotek became the first Oregon gubernatorial candidate to receive over a million votes.

== Pennsylvania ==
Pennsylvania gubernatorial election
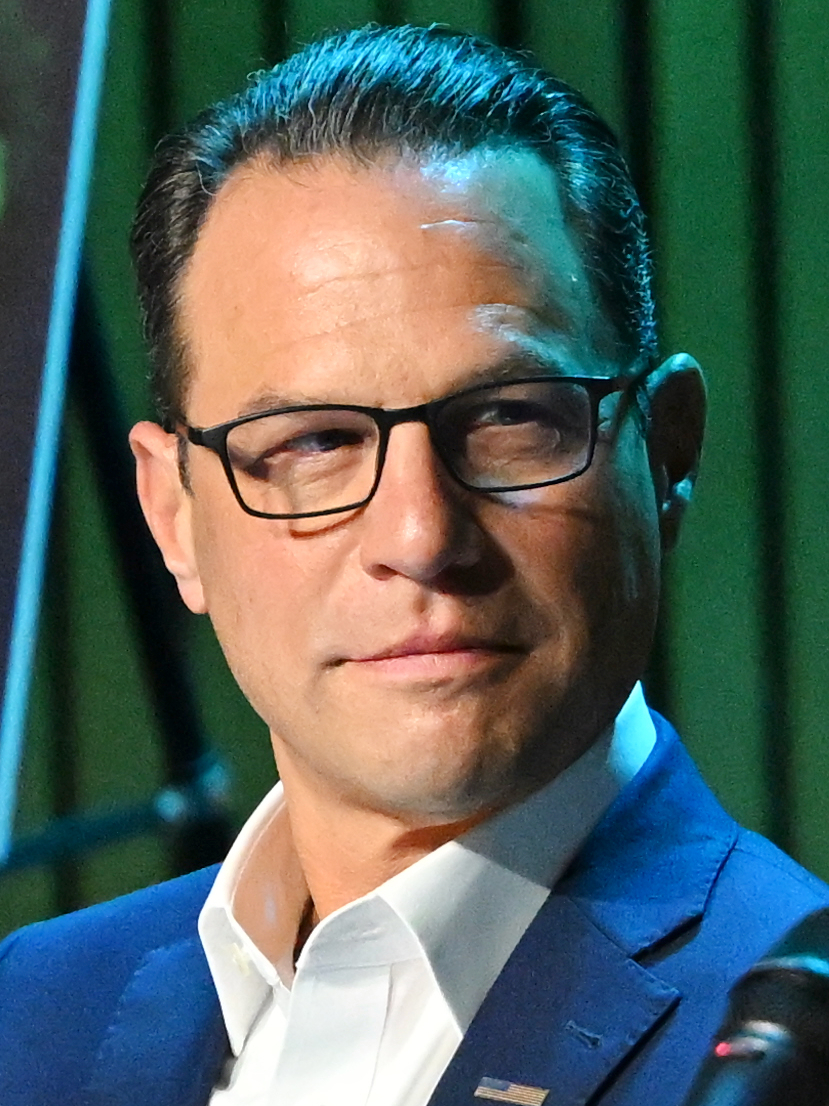

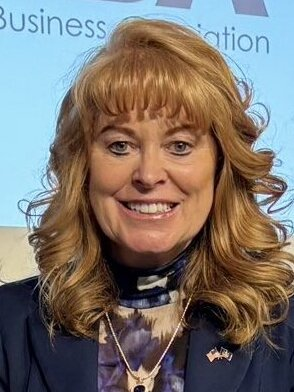
Nominee	Josh Shapiro	Stacy Garrity
Party	Democratic	Republican
Running mate	Austin Davis	Jason Richey
Popular vote	3,013,980	1,909,004
Percentage	60.4%	38.3%
- County results Shapiro: 50–60% 60–70% 70–80% 80–90% Garrity: 40–50% 50–60% 60–70% 70–80%
Governor before election
Josh Shapiro
Democratic
Elected Governor
Josh Shapiro
Democratic

Governor Josh Shapiro, a Democrat, was elected in 2022 with 56.5% of the vote. He ran for reelection to a second term and was the Democratic nominee. The Republican nominee was Pennsylvania Treasurer Stacy Garrity.

Shapiro comfortably defeated Garrity by more than 20 points.

== Rhode Island ==
Rhode Island gubernatorial election

Nominee	Helena Foulkes	Ken Block	Aaron Guckian
Party	Democratic	Independent	Republican
Popular vote	207,216	99,785	47,361
Percentage	57.7%	27.8%	13.2%
- Foulkes: 30–40% 40–50% 50–60% 60–70% 70–80% 80–90% Block: 30–40% 40–50%
Governor before election
Dan McKee
Democratic
Elected Governor
Helena Foulkes
Democratic

Governor Dan McKee, a Democrat, took office in 2021 following the resignation of Gina Raimondo and was elected to a full term in 2022 with 57.9% of the vote.

Helena Foulkes, a former CVS Pharmacy executive, challenged McKee in a rematch of their closely contested 2022 primary. Foulkes won the nomination, defeating McKee and making him the first elected governor to lose renomination since 2014. (Note: Governor Jeff Colyer of Kansas, who had taken office after the resignation of Sam Brownback, was defeated by Kris Kobach in the 2018 primary election.)

2022 lieutenant governor nominee Aaron Guckian defeated actress Elaine Pelino for the Republican nomination. Pelino subsequently requested a recount, which was approved by the Rhode Island Board of Elections. The recount did not change the outcome.

Founder of the Moderate Party of Rhode Island and businessman Ken Block ran as an independent candidate.

Foulkes defeated Block, who finished second, and Guckian, receiving 57.7% of the vote to Block's 37.7% and Guckian's 13.2%.

== South Carolina ==
South Carolina gubernatorial election
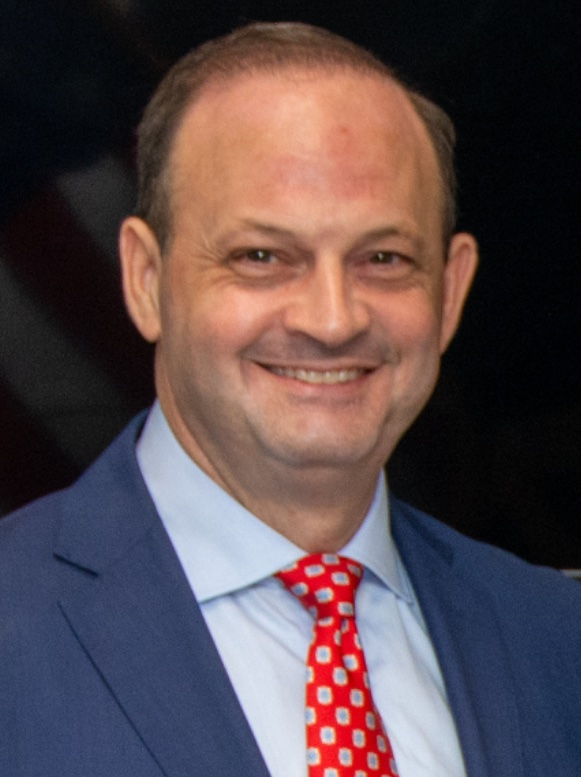

Nominee	Alan Wilson	Jermaine Johnson
Party	Republican	Democratic
Running mate	Mike Reichenbach	Sam Skardon
Popular vote	1,051,018	960,276
Percentage	51.6%	47.1%
- Johnson: 40–50% 50–60% 60–70% 70–80% 80–90% >90% Wilson: 40–50% 50–60% 60–70% 70–80% 80–90% >90% Tie: 40-50% No votes
Governor before election
Henry McMaster
Republican
Elected Governor
Alan Wilson
Republican

Governor Henry McMaster, a Republican, was re-elected in 2022 with 58.1% of the vote. He is term-limited by the South Carolina Constitution in 2026 and cannot seek re-election to a third consecutive full term.

Five Republicans contested the election; state senator Josh Kimbrell, attorney general Alan Wilson, lieutenant governor Pamela Evette, and U.S. representatives Ralph Norman and Nancy Mace. Evette and Wilson advanced to a runoff, which took place on June 23. Wilson won the runoff and became the Republican nominee.

On the Democratic side, state representative Jermaine Johnson was the nominee. Wilson defeated Johnson by four points, the closest South Carolina gubernatorial election since 1994.

== South Dakota ==
South Dakota gubernatorial election
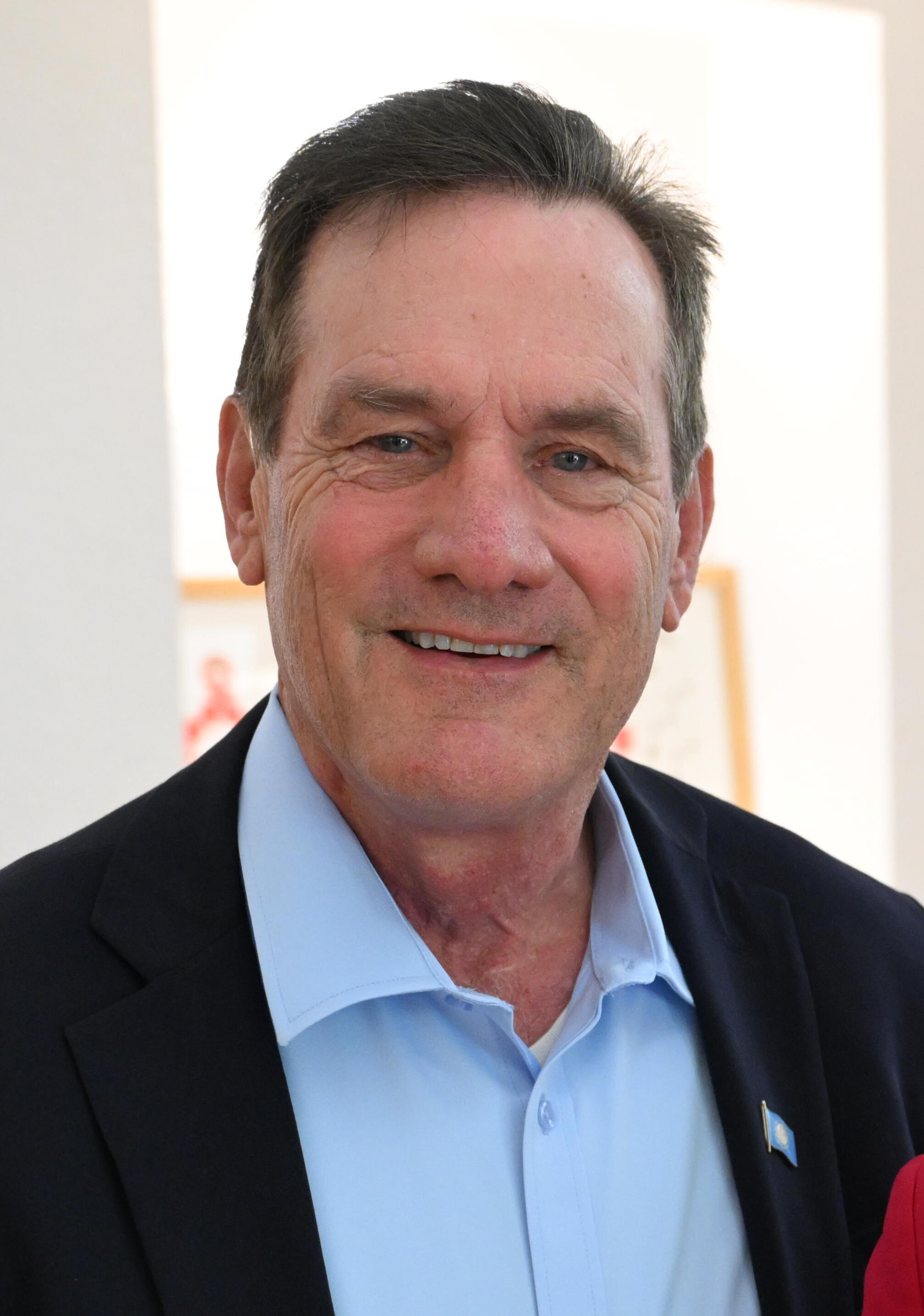

Nominee	Larry Rhoden	Dan Ahlers
Party	Republican	Democratic
Running mate	Tony Venhuizen	Steven McCleerey
Popular vote	193,335	111,161
Percentage	63.49%	36.51%
- County results Rhoden: 50–60% 60–70% 70–80% 80–90% >90% Ahlers: 50–60% 60–70% 70–80% 80–90%
Governor before election
Larry Rhoden
Republican
Elected Governor
Larry Rhoden
Republican

Governor Larry Rhoden, a Republican, assumed office in 2025 following the resignation of Kristi Noem to become Secretary of Homeland Security. Noem had been re-elected in 2022 with 62% of the vote. Rhoden ran for a full term.

Challenging Rhoden in the Republican primary were Speaker of the South Dakota House of Representatives Jon Hansen, U.S. Representative Dusty Johnson and real estate entrepreneur Toby Doeden. Doeden and Rhoden advanced to a runoff, which took place on July 28. Rhoden defeated Doeden in a landslide in the runoff and became the nominee.

On the Democratic side, South Dakota Democratic Party executive director Daniel Ahlers was the nominee.

Rhoden defeated Ahlers by nearly 27 points, winning a full term in office and continuing the longest currently-active gubernatorial winning streak for either party, as Democrats have not won a South Dakota gubernatorial election since 1974.

== Tennessee ==
Tennessee gubernatorial election
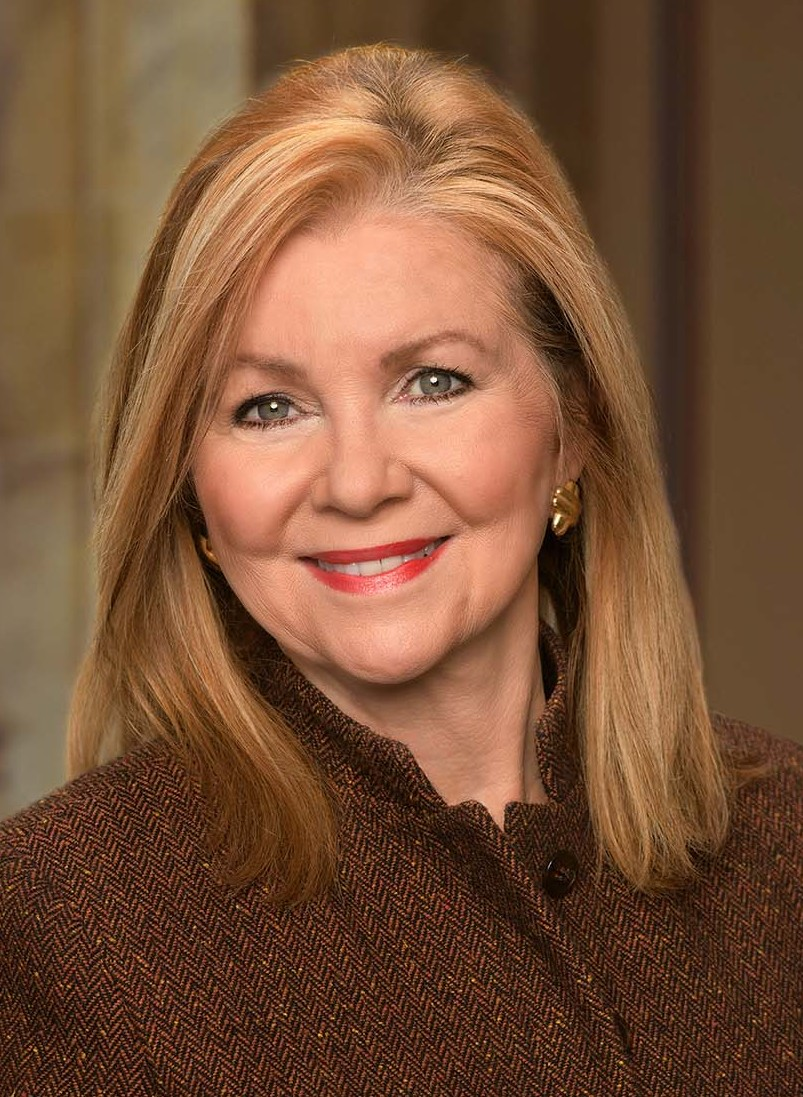

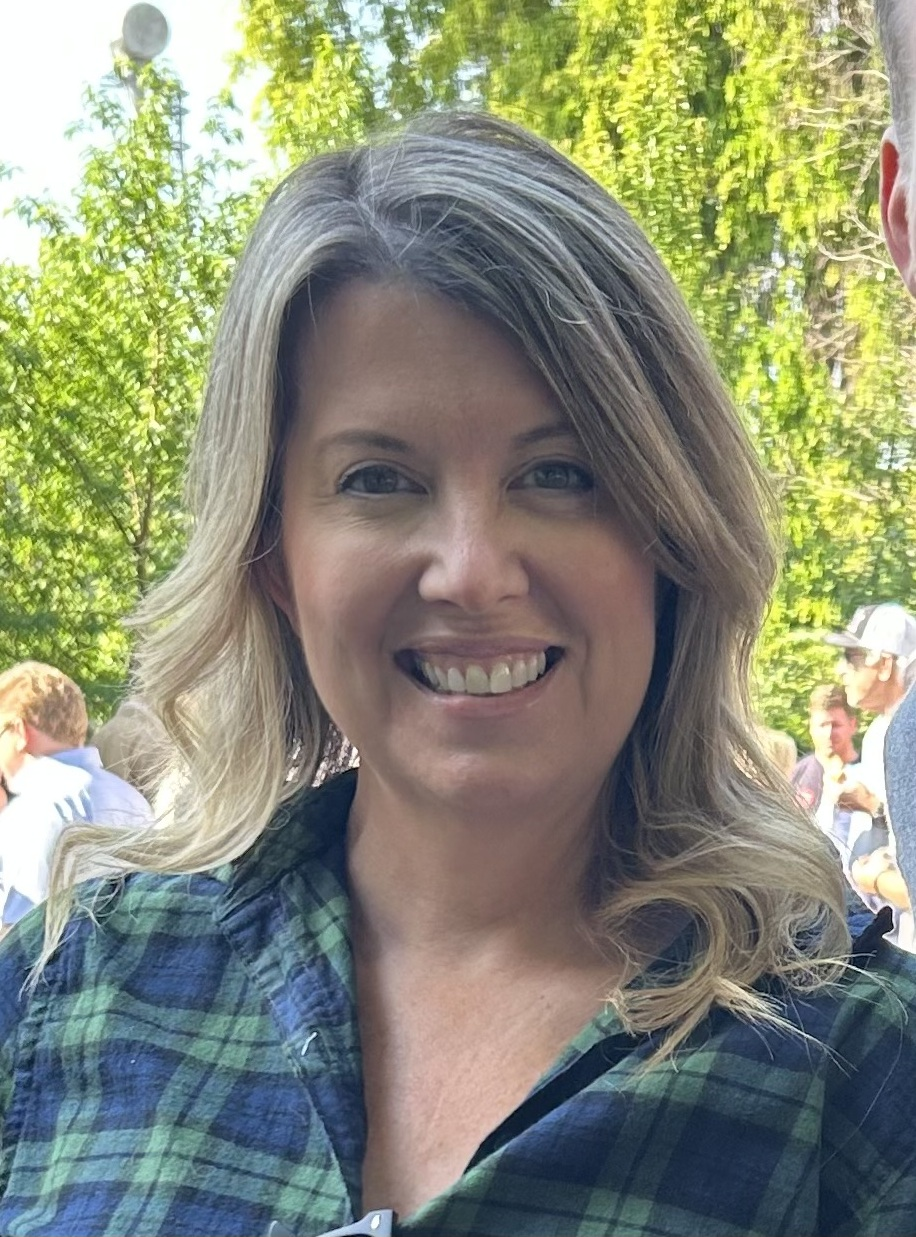

Nominee	Marsha Blackburn	Jerri Green	David Hatley
Party	Republican	Democratic	Independent
Popular vote	955,298	902,615	195,288
Percentage	45.5%	43.0%	9.3%
- County results Blackburn: 40–50% 50–60% 60–70% 70–80% Green: 40–50% 50–60% 60–70% 70–80%
Governor before election
Bill Lee
Republican
Elected Governor
Marsha Blackburn
Republican

Republican Governor Bill Lee was re-elected in 2022 with 64.9% of the vote. He was term-limited by the Tennessee Constitution in 2026 and could not seek re-election to a third consecutive term.

U.S. Senator Marsha Blackburn, state representative Monty Fritts, and U.S. Representative for Tennessee's 6th congressional district John Rose ran for the Republican nomination. Blackburn won the nomination with 43.4% of the vote on August 6.

For the Democrats, Memphis city councilor Jerri Green defeated leader of New Chicago Community Development Corporation and 2022 candidate for governor Carnita Atwater, nominee for the 109th district in the Illinois House of Representatives in 2010 Tim Cyr, and guitarist Adam Kurtz for the nomination.

Former Lipscomb University professor Lauren Pinkston and businessman David Hatley ran as independents.

Blackburn won the election by about 2.5% over Green, a surprisingly narrow margin. Hatley took over 9% of the vote, attracting support from conservative voters who were dissatisfied with Blackburn. Blackburn became the first woman elected governor of Tennessee and the first candidate since 1932 to win the governorship with less than 50% of the popular vote, securing the smallest margin of victory in a Tennessee gubernatorial election in more than a century. Her victory extended Republican control of the governorship, which the party has held since 2011.

== Texas ==
Texas gubernatorial election
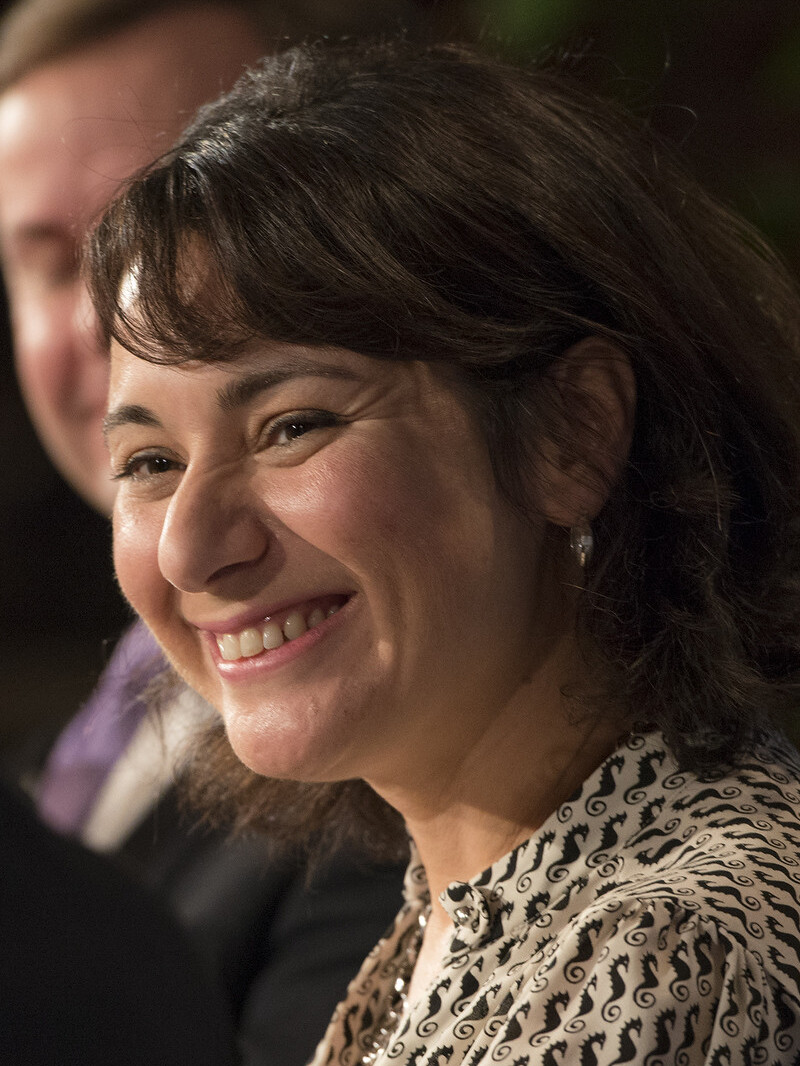

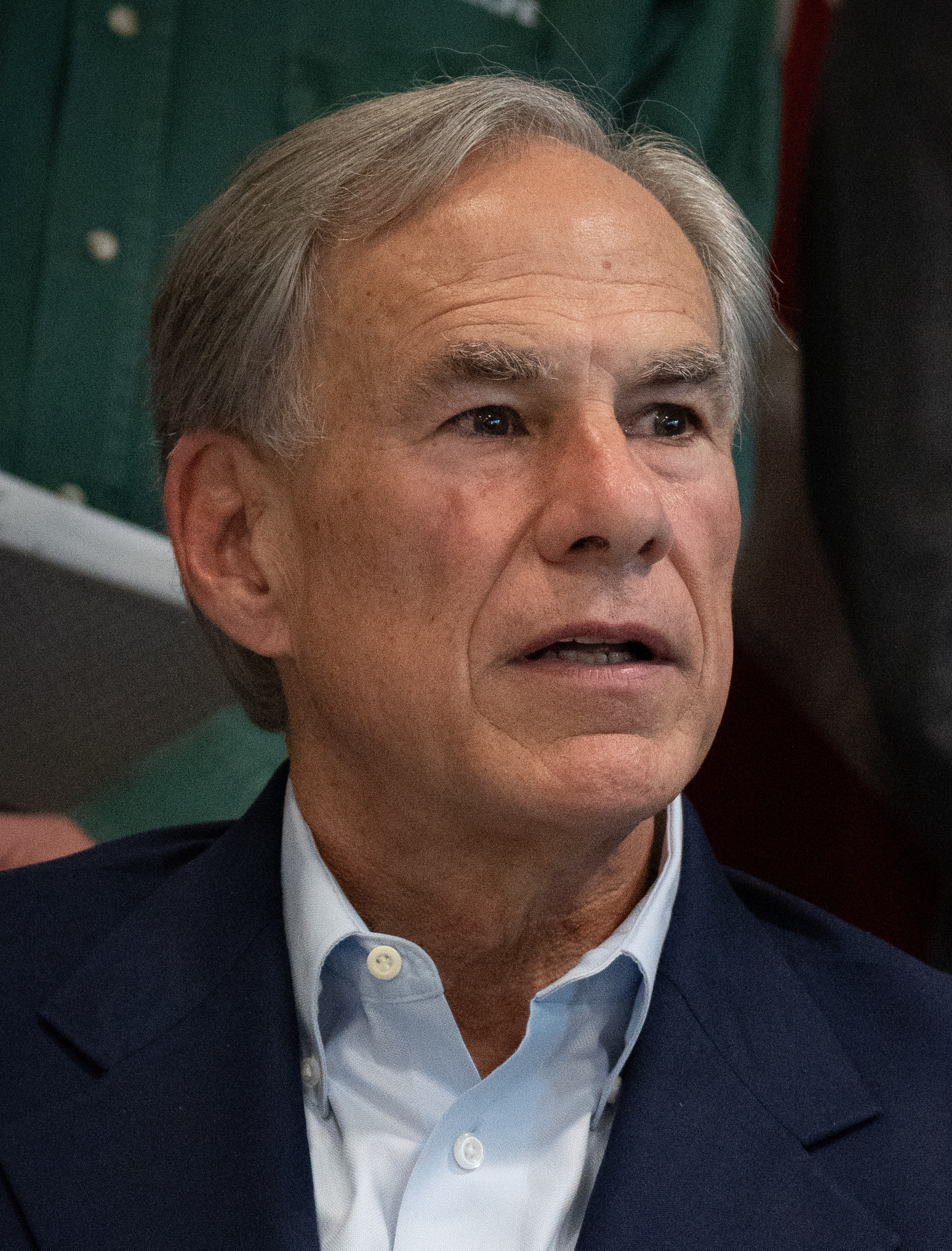
Nominee	Gina Hinojosa	Greg Abbott
Party	Democratic	Republican
Popular vote	5,231,979	4,525,393
Percentage	52.8%	45.7%
- Hinojosa: 40–50% 50–60% 60–70% 70–80% Abbott: 40–50% 50–60% 60–70% 70–80% 80–90% >90%
Governor before election
Greg Abbott
Republican
Elected Governor
Gina Hinojosa
Democratic

Governor Greg Abbott, a Republican, was re-elected in 2022 with 54.8% of the vote. Because Texas does not have gubernatorial term limits in its Constitution, he is eligible to run for re-election to a fourth term. On March 1, 2024, Abbott announced his intention to seek re-election. He won the primary with over 80% of the vote.

The Democratic nominee is state representative Gina Hinojosa. Hinojosa beat Chris Bell, a former U.S. representative for Texas's 25th congressional district and former candidate for governor in 2006, mayor of Houston in 2001 and 2015, and U.S. Senate in 2020, and Bobby Cole, a rancher, in the primary.

Hinojosa defeated Abbott by about seven points, becoming the first Democrat to win a gubernatorial election in Texas since Ann Richards in 1990, while Abbott is the first incumbent governor of Texas to lose reelection since Richards' reelection bid in 1994.

== Vermont ==
Vermont gubernatorial election
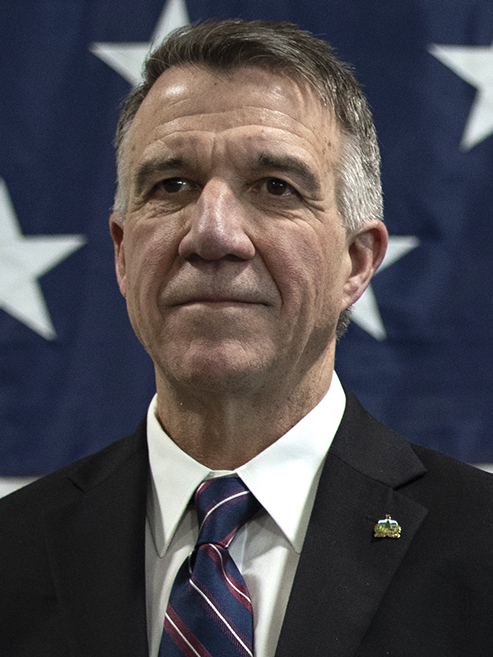

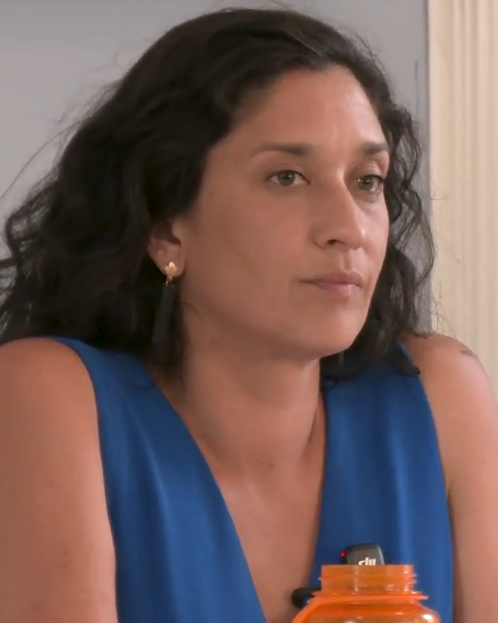
Nominee	Phil Scott	Amanda Janoo
Party	Republican	Democratic
Alliance		Progressive
Popular vote	162,048	141,631
Percentage	52.4%	45.8%
- Scott: 40–50% 50–60% 60–70% Janoo: 40–50% 50–60%
Governor before election
Phil Scott
Republican
Elected Governor
Phil Scott
Republican

Governor Phil Scott, a Republican, was re-elected in 2024 with 73.4% of the vote. Scott ran for a sixth two-year term, declaring only hours before the filing deadline was required. He won the primary unopposed.

For the Democrats, economist Amanda Janoo served as the nominee. She narrowly defeated former lobbying group CEO Aly Richards in the primary. Attorney General Charity Clark was considered a potential candidate and had previously said she that she would run for statewide office in 2026, but she instead decided to seek re-election to her current office. State Treasurer Mike Pieciak was reported to have considered a campaign for the governor, but he too choose to seek re-election.

Dean Roy, a 14-year-old from Stowe, ran as a member of the Freedom and Unity Party. Vermont has no minimum age requirement for the governorship, allowing Roy to seek the governorship despite not being old enough to vote.

Scott won re-election to a sixth term by just under seven points, the narrowest victory in any of his gubernatorial campaigns.

== Wisconsin ==
Wisconsin gubernatorial election
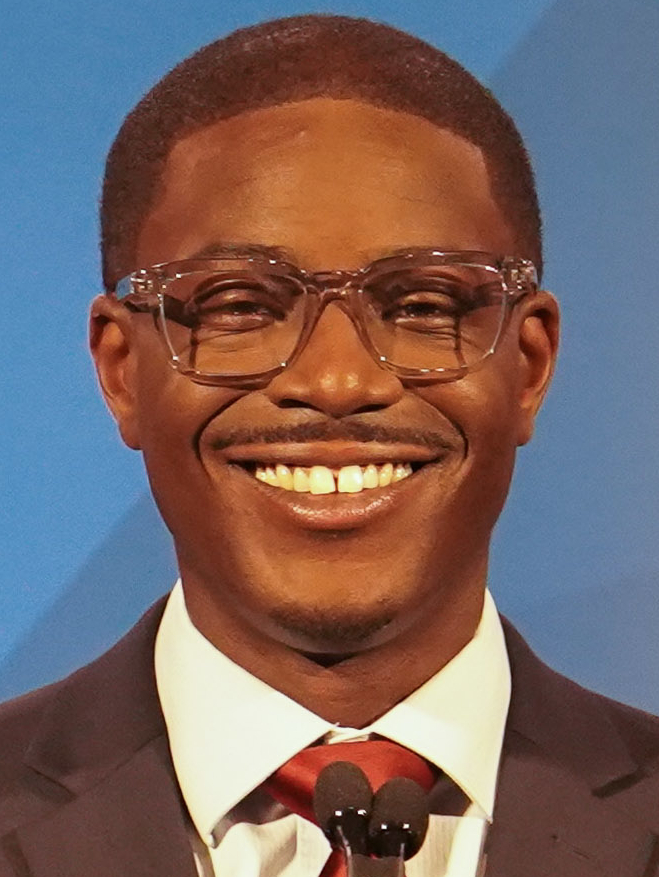

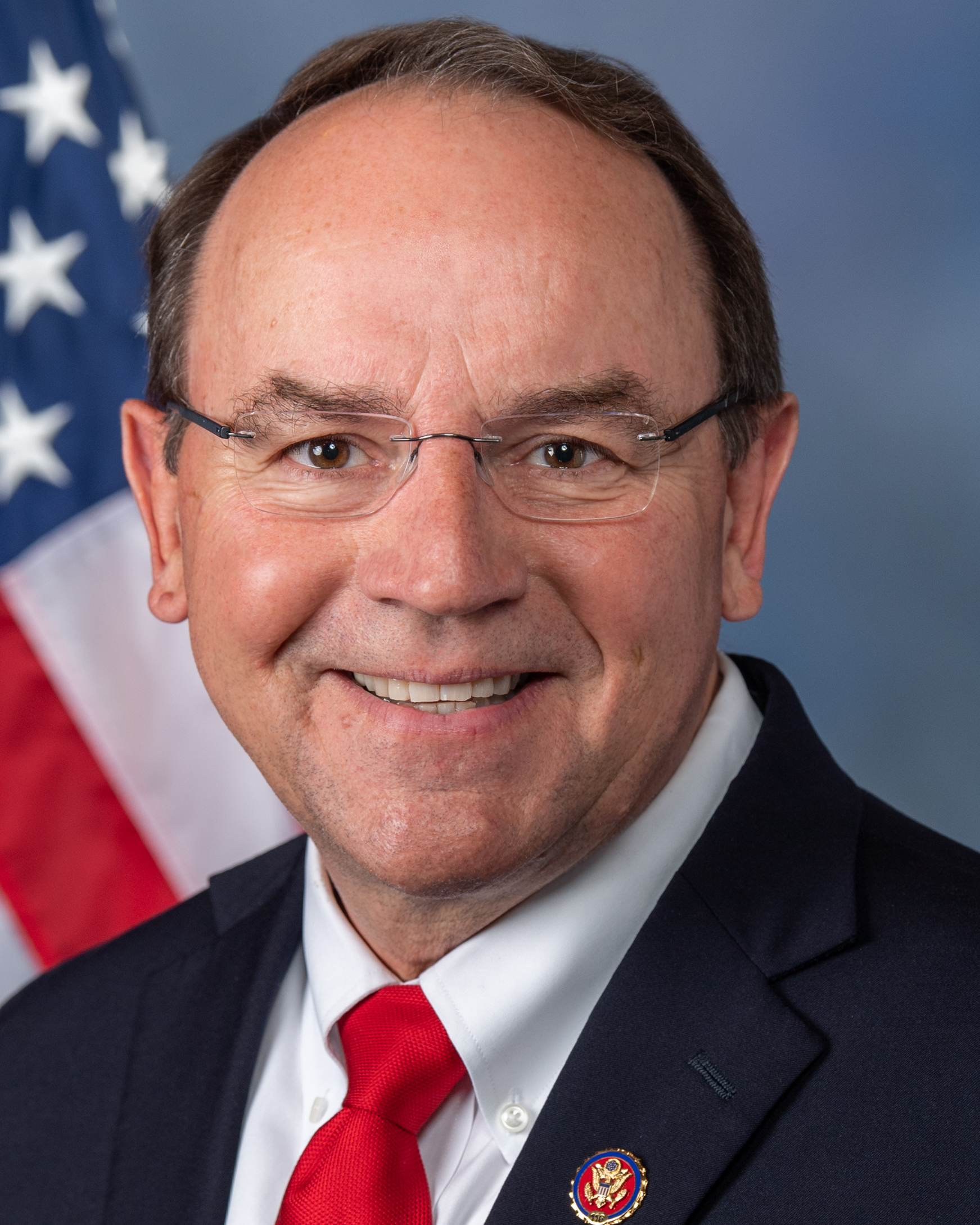
Nominee	David Crowley	Tom Tiffany
Party	Democratic	Republican
Running mate	Sarah Godlewski	David Varnam
Popular vote	1,440,992	1,227,675
Percentage	54.0%	46.0%
- Crowley: 50–60% 60–70% 70–80% 80–90% Tiffany: 50–60% 60–70% 70–80%
Governor before election
Tony Evers
Democratic
Elected Governor
David Crowley
Democratic

Governor Tony Evers, a Democrat, was re-elected in 2022 with 51.2% of the vote. Despite Wisconsin not having gubernatorial term limits in its Constitution, Evers announced on July 24, 2025, that he would not seek re-election.

Milwaukee County executive David Crowley won the Democratic primary, defeating former secretary of the Wisconsin Department of Administration Joel Brennan, state senator Kelda Roys, and state representative Francesca Hong.

U.S. Representative for Wisconsin's 7th congressional district Tom Tiffany won the Republican primary, defeating medical service technician Andy Manske.

Crowley defeated Tiffany by about eight percentage points, becoming Wisconsin's first African American governor. Crowley's eight-point margin of victory is the largest in a Wisconsin gubernatorial election since Republican Tommy Thompson's third re-election in 1998, and the largest margin for a Democrat since Thompson's predecessor, Tony Earl, won election with 57% of the vote in 1982.

== Wyoming ==
Wyoming gubernatorial election

Nominee	Eric Barlow	Rebecca Bextel	Kenneth Casner
Party	Republican	Constitution	Democratic
Popular vote	128,496	31,444	27,472
Percentage	68.12%	16.67%	14.57%
- Barlow: 40–50% 50–60% 60–70% 70–80% 80–90% Bextel: 40–50% Casner: 40–50% 50–60% Tie: 40–50% 50% No data
Governor before election
Mark Gordon
Republican
Elected Governor
Eric Barlow
Republican

Governor Mark Gordon, a Republican, was re-elected in 2022 with 74.1% of the vote. He was term-limited by state law in 2026 and therefore could not seek reelection to a third consecutive term.

State senator Eric Barlow defeated Wyoming Superintendent of Public Instruction Megan Degenfelder and civil engineer Brent Bien for the Republican nomination. Barlow won the general election by a margin of over 50 percentage points.

Perennial candidate Kenneth Casner was the Democratic nominee.

Barlow won his first term with 68% of the vote. Casner finished behind Constitution Party nominee Rebecca Bextel, who received 16.6% of the vote to Casner's 14.5%. Casner was the first Democratic gubernatorial nominee since statehood who did not finish in the top two in a Wyoming gubernatorial election, and was the worst-performing of all 36 Democratic gubernatorial nominees in the 2026 cycle.

== Territories and federal district ==
=== District of Columbia ===
2026 United States gubernatorial elections
- November 3, 2026

Nominee	Janeese Lewis George	Rhonda Hamilton
Party	Democratic	Independent
Popular vote	186,431	22,160
Percentage	84.4%	10.0%
Mayor before election
Muriel Bowser
Democratic
Elected Mayor
Janeese Lewis George
Democratic

Mayor Muriel Bowser was re-elected in 2022 with 74.6% of the vote. She is retiring and did not seek a fourth term. Councilmember Janeese Lewis George was the Democratic nominee. Information technology specialist Robert L. Gross is the DC Statehood Party nominee.

Lewis George won her first term as mayor with 84% of the vote, her closest opponent being independent Rhonda Hamilton, who received 10% of the vote.

=== Guam ===
2026 Guam gubernatorial election
- November 3, 2026

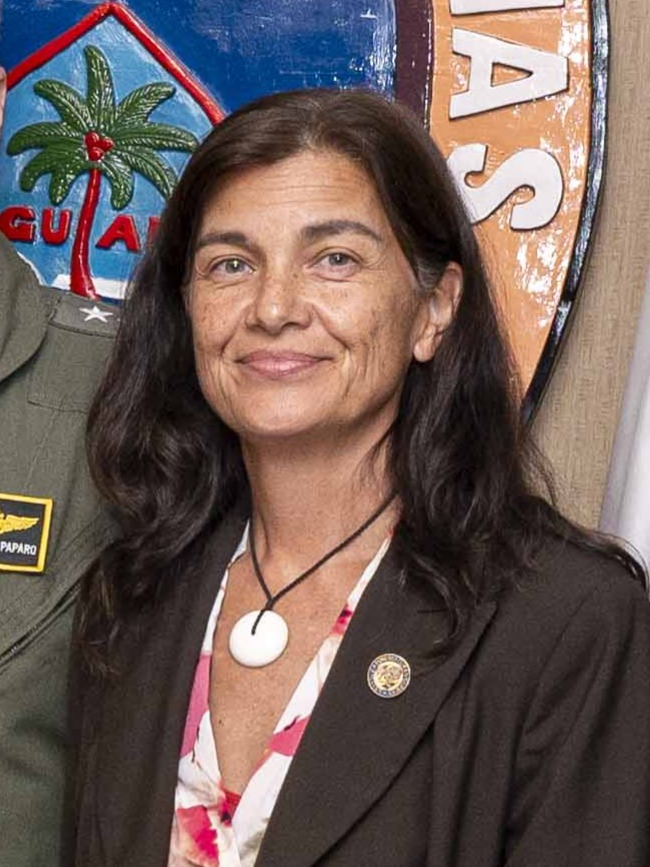
Nominee	Vicente Ada	Therese Terlaje
Party	Republican	Democratic
Running mate	Edward Calvo	Sabina Perez
Popular vote	15,945	14,925
Percentage	51.45%	48.15%
- Results by village Ada: 40–50% 50–60% 60–70% Terlaje: 50–60% 60–70% Tie: 40–50%
Governor before election
Lou Leon Guerrero
Democratic
Elected Governor
Vicente Ada
Republican

Governor Lou Leon Guerrero was re-elected in 2022 with 55.5% of the vote. She will be term limited in 2026 and cannot seek re-election for a third consecutive term. Lieutenant Governor Josh Tenorio, a Democrat elected alongside Leon Guerrero, announced in 2023 that he would pursue the governorship in 2026. Tenorio, however, lost the Democratic primary to Therese Terlaje.

Republican nominee Vicente Ada won the election with 51.5% of the vote, flipping the office from the Democrats by defeating Terlaje who received 48.2% of the vote. This marked the first time since 2014 that a Republican had been elected as Governor of Guam. Guam was also unique in having the only 2026 gubernatorial race that the Republican Party gained from the Democratic Party in what was otherwise dubbed a "blue wave" nationwide.

=== Northern Mariana Islands ===
2026 Northern Mariana Islands gubernatorial election
- November 3, 2026 (first round); November 20, 2026 (second round)
- Reporting: 86.6% as of 21 November 2026; 2:04 AM ChST
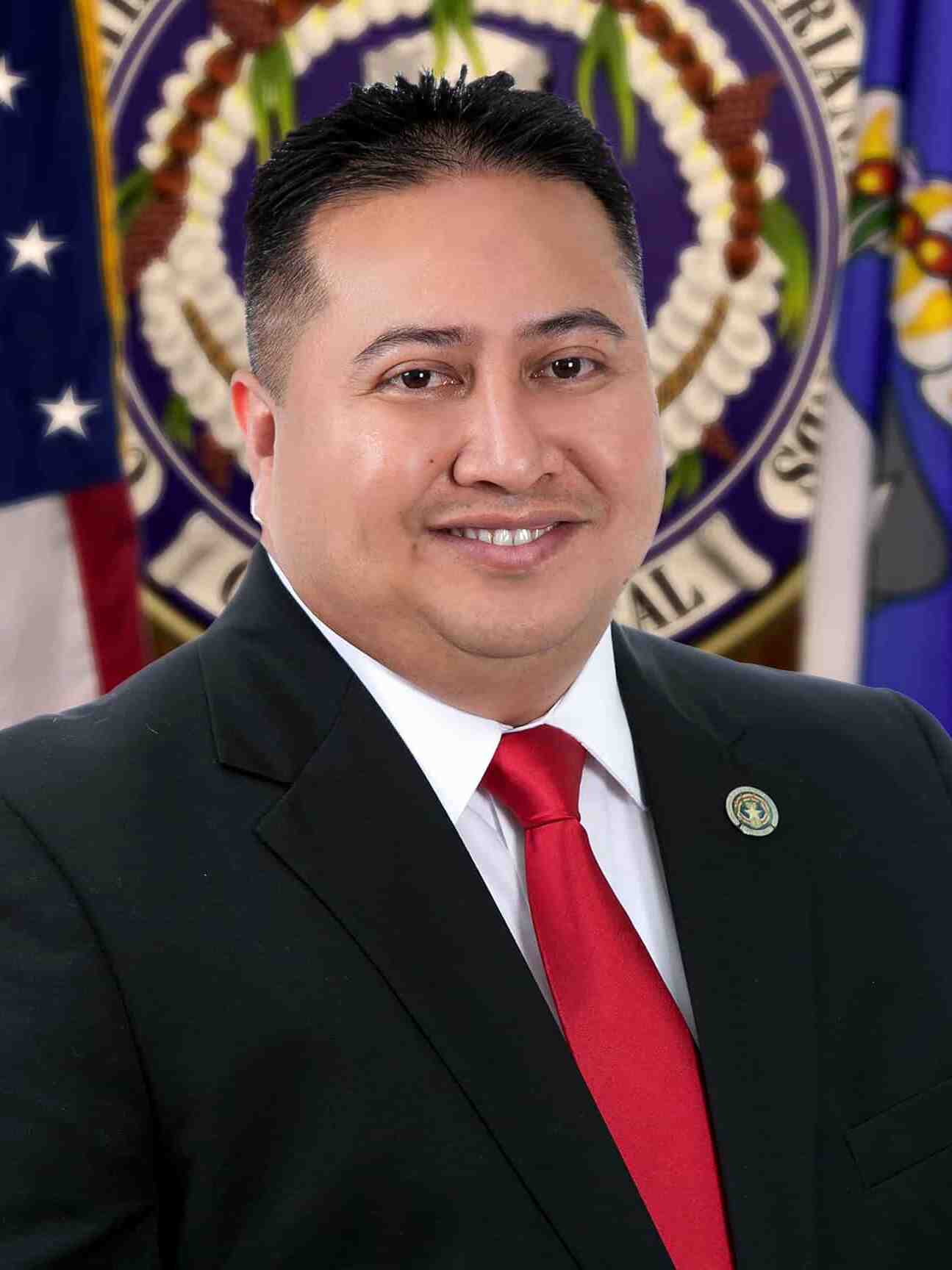

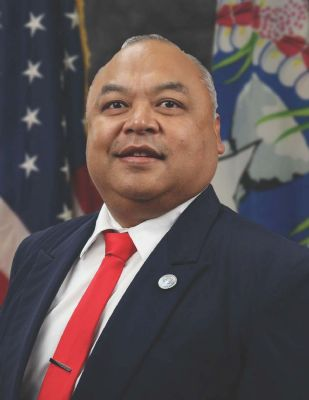

Nominee	Ralph Torres	Blas T. Attao	Lawrence F. Camacho
Party	Republican	Independent	Independent
Alliance		Democratic
Running mate	Ben Jones	Edmund Villagomez	Edith DeLeon Guerrero
First round	6,437; 49.5%	5,043; 38.7%	1,537; 11.8%
Runoff	5,763	5,489	Eliminated
Governor before election
David M. Apatang
Independent
Elected Governor
Ralph Torres
Republican

Governor David M. Apatang, an independent, took office in 2025 upon the death of Arnold Palacios. Palacios was elected in 2022 with 54.1% of the vote. Apatang is eligible to run for a full term, but announced on March 29, 2026, that he would not do so and instead endorsed Attao. Independent Blas T. Attao and former Republican governor Ralph Torres have announced campaigns. No candidate received 50% of the vote in the first round, forcing a runoff election to be held 14 days after the certification of the election on November 20. Results are not likely to be complete until after absentee ballots are counted on December 4.

=== U.S. Virgin Islands ===
2026 United States Virgin Islands gubernatorial election
- November 3, 2026
- Turnout: 20,047
- Reporting: 100% as of 9:00 PM AST
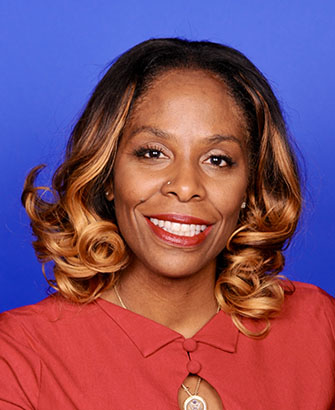

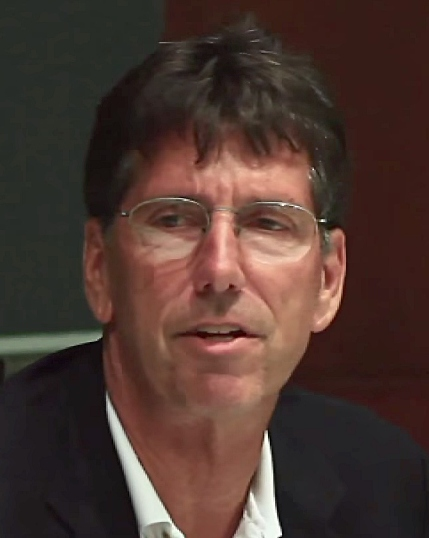
Nominee	Stacey Plaskett	Adlah Donastorg Jr.	Oakland Benta
Party	Democratic	Independent	Independent
Running mate	Milton E. Potter	Positive Nelson	Merwin Potter
Popular vote	11,865	2,507	2,273
Percentage	62.8%	13.3%	12.0%
Nominee	Warren Mosler	Gustav James
Party	Independent	Independent
Running mate	Collin Robertson	Randolph Bennett
Popular vote	1,293	637
Percentage	6.8%	3.4%
Governor before election
Albert Bryan
Democratic
Elected Governor
Stacey Plaskett
Democratic

Governor Albert Bryan was re-elected in 2022 with 56.1% of the vote. He will be term limited in 2026 and cannot seek re-election for a third consecutive term.

Incumbent delegate to the United States House of Representatives Stacey Plaskett defeated Lieutenant Governor Tregenza Roach and former senator Donna Frett-Gregory in the primary.

Plaskett faced former Saint Croix police chief and senator Oakland Benta, former Democratic senator Adlah Donastorg Jr., former public works commissioner Gustav James, and hedge fund executive Warren Mosler, who are running as independents in the general election. Plaskett overwhelmingly won the election, receiving nearly 63% of the vote while none of her opponents received more than 13.3%.
