= Wisconsin's 57th Assembly district =

American legislative district in central Wisconsin

Wisconsin's 57th State Assembly district
- 2024 map defined in 2023 Wisc. Act 94; 2022 map defined in Johnson v. Wisconsin Elections Commission; 2011 map was defined in 2011 Wisc. Act 43
Assemblymember
Kevin David Petersen; R–Waupaca
since January 6, 2025 (1 years)
- Demographics: 92.21% White; 1.21% Black; 3.62% Hispanic; 0.68% Asian; 1.67% Native American; 0.08% Hawaiian/Pacific Islander
- Population (2020) • Voting age: 59,642; 48,119
- Website: Official website
- Notes: Central Wisconsin

The 57th Assembly district of the Wisconsin is one of 99 districts in the Wisconsin State Assembly. Located in central Wisconsin, the district comprises nearly all of Waushara County and most of the southern half of Waupaca County, along with parts of western Winnebago County, southwest Outagamie County, southeast Portage County, and eastern Adams County. It includes the cities of Manawa, Wautoma, Waupaca, and Weyauwega, and the villages of Almond, Coloma, Fremont, Hancock, Lohrville, Ogdensburg, Plainfield, Redgranite, and Wild Rose. The district also contains Hartman Creek State Park and historic sites such as Waupaca's Main Street Historic District and the King Wisconsin Veterans Home, established for veterans of the American Civil War, containing the Veterans Cottages Historic District, the Commandant's Residence Home, and the Veterans Home Chapel. The district is represented by Republican Kevin David Petersen, since January 2025; Petersen previously represented the 40th district from 2007 to 2025.

The 57th Assembly district is located within Wisconsin's 19th Senate district, along with the 55th and 56th Assembly districts.

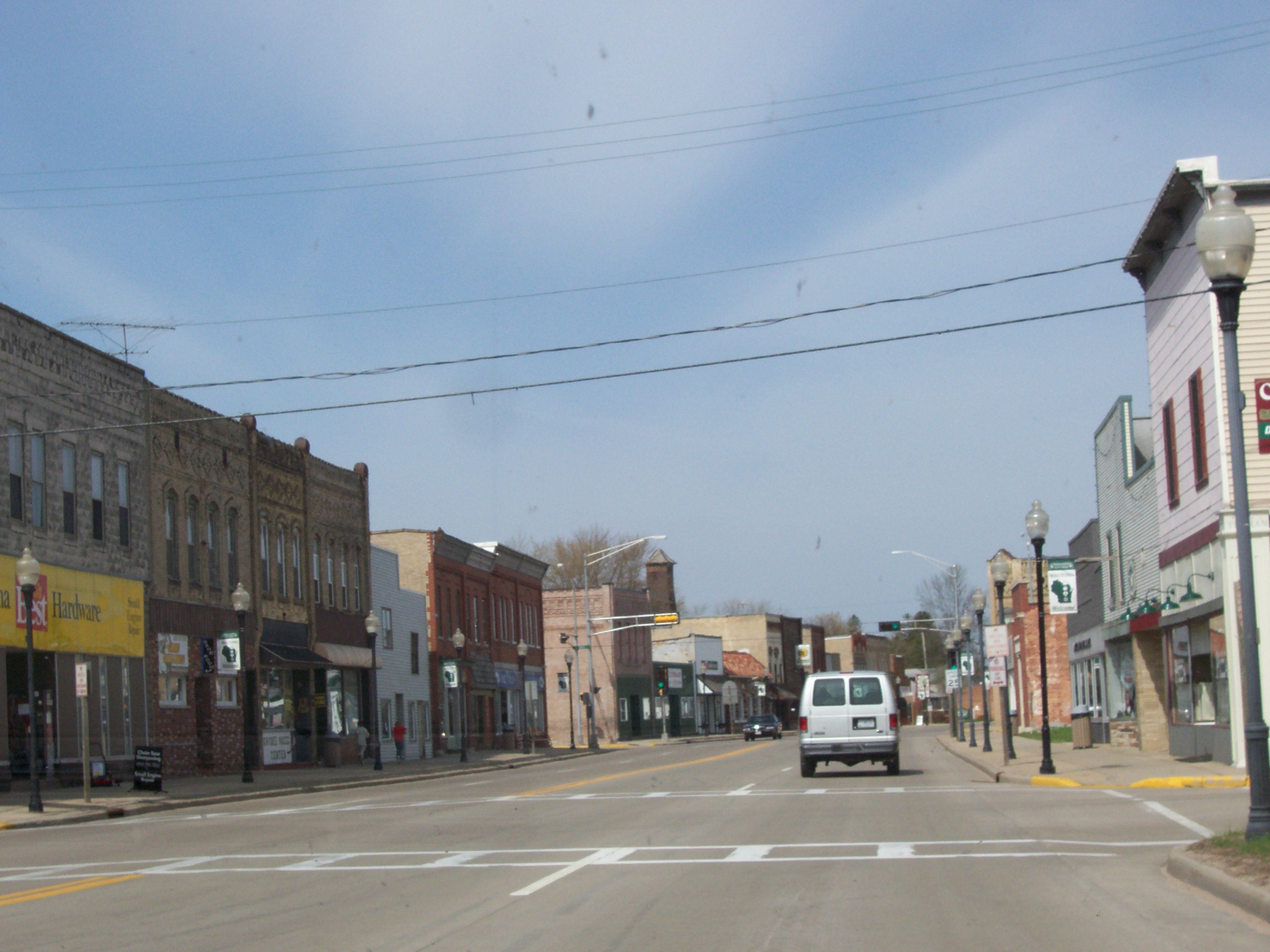
Downtown Wautoma

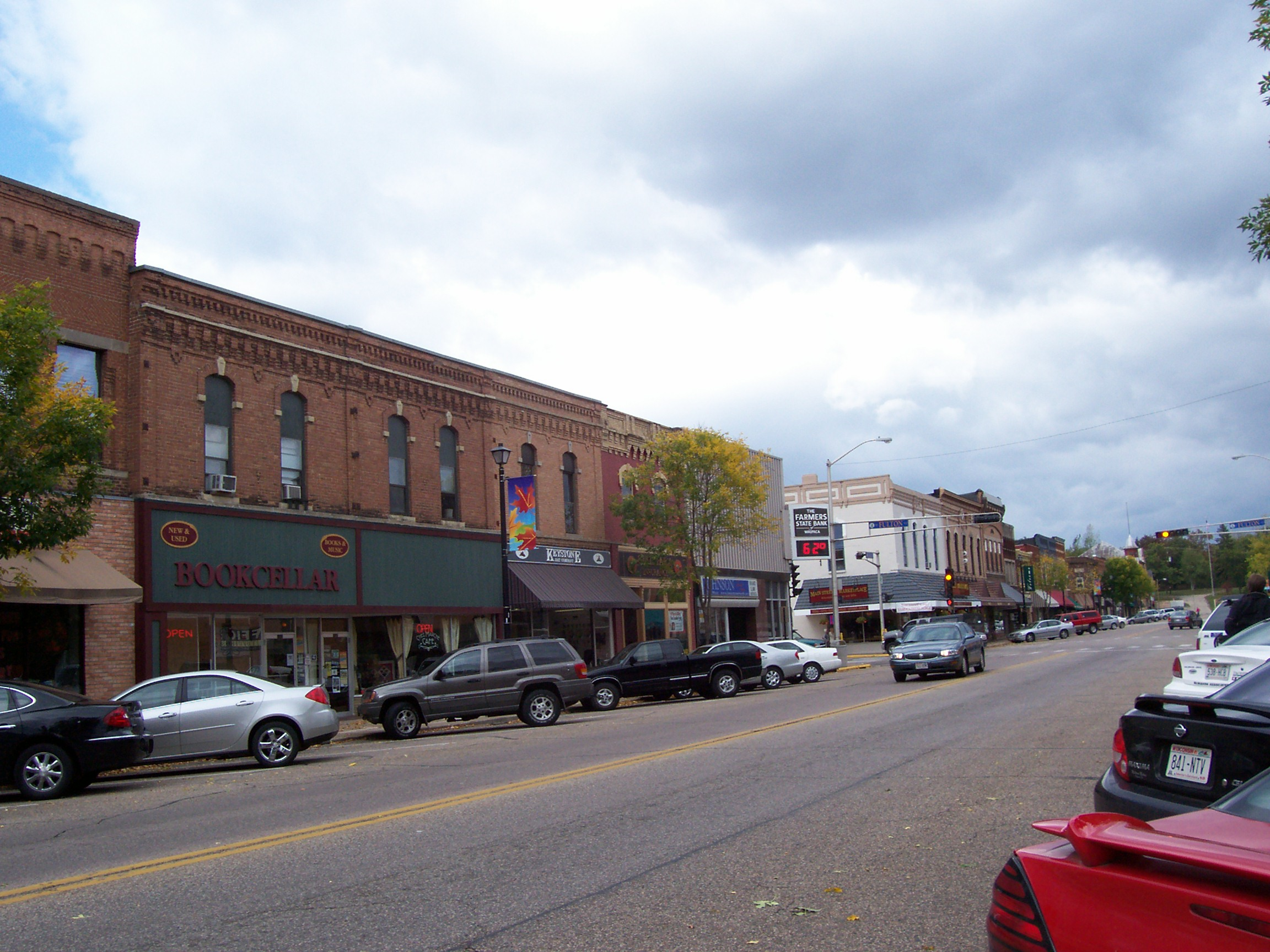
Main Street Historic District in Waupaca

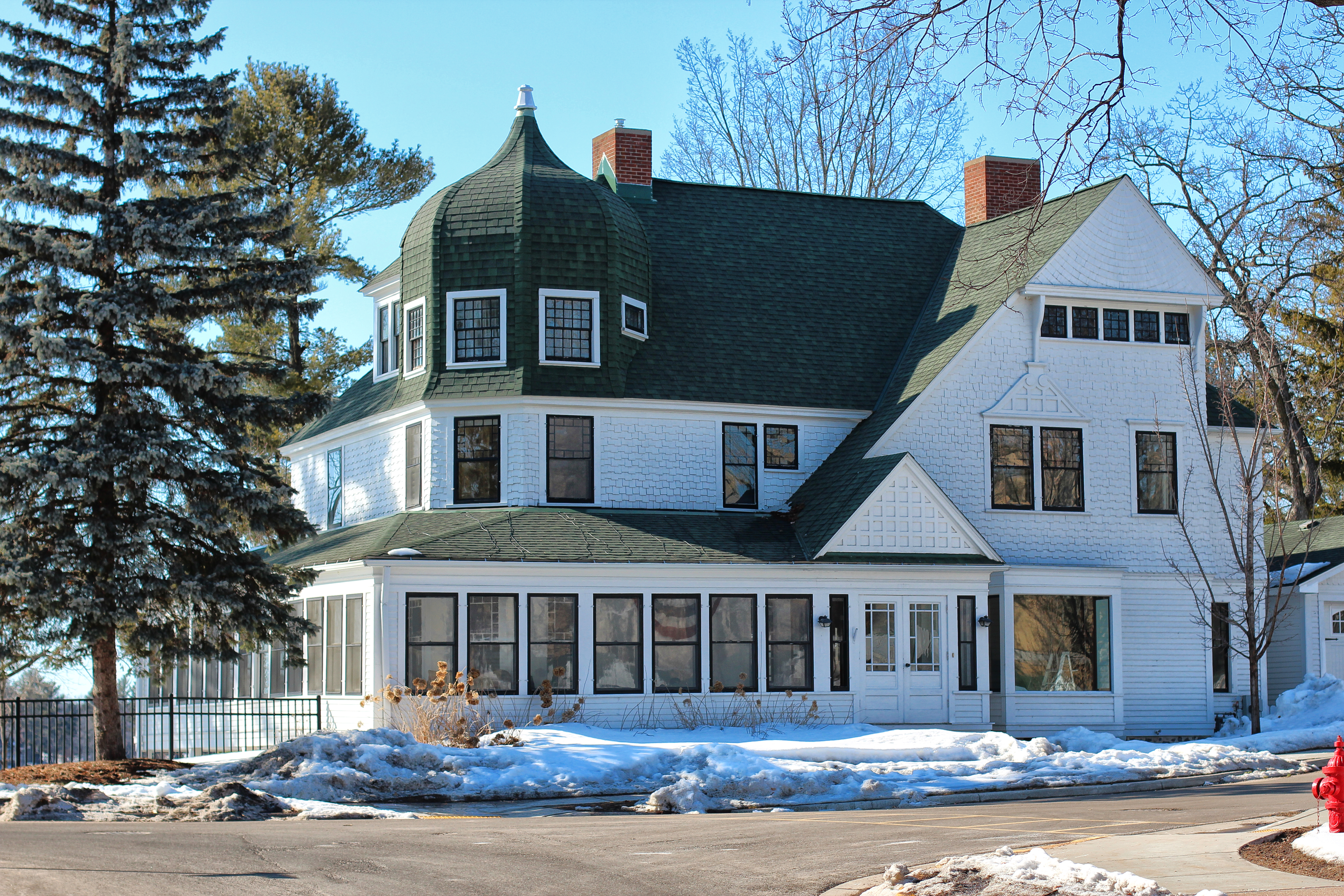
Commandant's Residence Home in the Historic Wisconsin Veterans Home

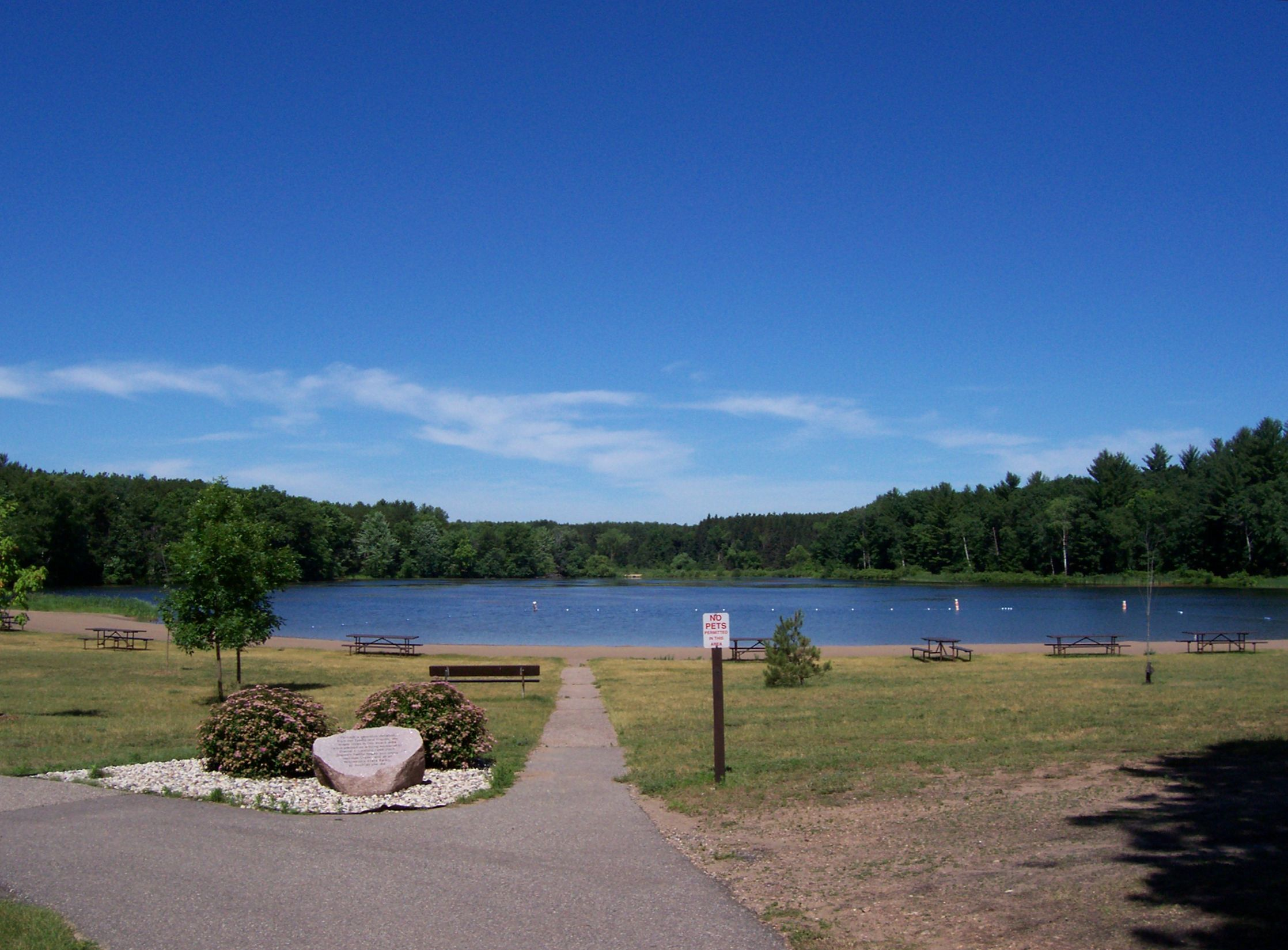
Hartman Creek State Park

== List of past representatives ==
List of representatives to the Wisconsin State Assembly from the 57th district
Member	Party	Residence	Counties represented	Term start	Term end	Ref.
District created
Gordon R. Bradley	Rep.	Oshkosh	Fond du Lac, Winnebago	January 1, 1973	January 3, 1983	
Heron Van Gorden	Rep.	Neillsville	Clark, Marathon, Taylor	January 3, 1983	January 7, 1985	
David Prosser Jr.	Rep.	Appleton	Outagamie	January 7, 1985	January 6, 1997	
Steve Wieckert	Rep.	Appleton	Outagamie	January 6, 1997	January 5, 2009	
Penny Bernard Schaber	Dem.	Appleton	Outagamie	January 5, 2009	January 3, 2015	
Amanda Stuck	Dem.	Appleton	Outagamie, Winnebago	January 3, 2015	January 4, 2021	
Lee Snodgrass	Dem.	Appleton	Outagamie, Winnebago	January 4, 2021	January 6, 2025	
Kevin David Petersen	Rep.	Waupaca	Adams, Outagamie, Portage, Waupaca, Waushara, Winnebago	January 6, 2025	Current	
