= National Register of Historic Places listings in Waupaca County, Wisconsin =

Location of Waupaca County in Wisconsin

This is a list of the National Register of Historic Places listings in Waupaca County, Wisconsin. It is intended to provide a comprehensive listing of entries in the National Register of Historic Places that are located in Waupaca County, Wisconsin. The locations of National Register properties for which the latitude and longitude coordinates are included below may be seen in a map.

There are 26 properties and districts listed on the National Register in the county.

This National Park Service list is complete through NPS recent listings posted September 11, 2026.

== Current listings ==
| | Name on the Register | Image | Date listed | Location | City or town | Description |
|---|---|---|---|---|---|---|
| 1 | Browne Law Office | Browne Law Office | August 18, 1980 (#80000208) | 202 E. Union St. 44°21′27″N 89°05′00″W | Waupaca | Simple Greek Revival office built in 1854 by pioneer lawyer E. L. Browne, and later used by his son E. E. Browne, a U.S. congressman. Believed to be the longest continuously-operating law office in Wisconsin. |
| 2 | Clintonville Federal Savings and Loan Association | | January 16, 2025 (#100011304) | 60 10th Street; 44°37′26″N 88°45′49″W | Clintonville | Contemporary-style bank designed by Quentin Hoffman of Green Bay and built in 1965. The structure has two levels, with a footprint of circular shapes and walls of glass and fieldstone. This listing was incorrectly listed by the NPS as being in Waukesha County. |
| 3 | Clintonville High School | Clintonville High School | September 17, 2018 (#100002941) | 105 S Clinton Ave. & 25 8th St. 44°37′14″N 88°45′51″W | Clintonville | Now an elementary school. |
| 4 | Clintonville Post Office | Clintonville Post Office | October 24, 2000 (#00001253) | 2 N. Main St. 44°37′24″N 88°45′34″W | Clintonville | Art Moderne-styled building constructed in 1935 by the Public Works Administration. |
| 5 | Commandant's Residence Home | Commandant's Residence Home | June 19, 1985 (#85001364) | Off WI 22; 44°20′17″N 89°08′43″W | King | Large Queen Anne-styled home designed by William Waters and built in 1888 by the GAR to house retired soldiers. Now houses King's commandant. |
| 6 | Crescent Roller Mills | Crescent Roller Mills | December 20, 1978 (#78000150) | 213 Oborn St. 44°21′22″N 89°04′28″W | Waupaca | 3-story wooden flour mill built in 1884. Was the last mill in the state to operate on water-power, grinding specialty flour into the 1960s. Derelict, partially gone per Google Street View. |
| 7 | Danes Hall | Danes Hall | January 17, 1980 (#80000209) | 303 N. Main St. 44°21′36″N 89°05′04″W | Waupaca | 3-story Queen Anne/Romanesque meeting hall of Waupaca's Danish Brotherhood in America lodge, designed by William Waters and built in 1894. |
| 8 | Henry and Elizabeth Delong House | Henry and Elizabeth Delong House | October 4, 2002 (#02001105) | 509 W. Fulton St. 44°21′35″N 89°05′36″W | Waupaca | American Foursquare house with Classical Revival styling, built by Conrad Gmeiner for his wife's parents. Gmeiner ran a local brickyard and used a variety of materials and designs to showcase what he could build. |
| 9 | Halfway House | Halfway House | March 1, 1982 (#82000728) | Potts Ave. 44°18′44″N 89°09′22″W | King | Stagecoach stop built in 1852. A.k.a. Jones' Tavern. |
| 10 | Jens Hansen Wagon and Carriage Shop | Jens Hansen Wagon and Carriage Shop | June 17, 1994 (#94000601) | 117 E. Fulton St. 44°21′30″N 89°05′02″W | Waupaca | 2-story brick shop with Italianate details, built in 1868 and added on to around 1894. |
| 11 | William H. Hatten Recreation Park | | August 7, 2024 (#100010639) | 801 Werner-Allen Road; 44°23′12″N 88°45′08″W | New London | 120-acre park initially developed from 1935 to 1942 under the WPA, to create jobs for New London men during the Great Depression, digging and grading, laying stone and building structures. Landscaping was designed by Franz A. Aust. Since then, the park has hosted swimming lessons, ball games, community celebrations, etc. |
| 12 | Matt and Lena Jensen House | Matt and Lena Jensen House | October 4, 2002 (#02001108) | 501 W. Fulton St. 44°21′34″N 89°05′35″W | Waupaca | Grand 3-story Queen Anne house built by Hans Knudsen for the Jensens in 1894. Matt was a butcher and cattle-buyer who had immigrated from Denmark in 1872. |
| 13 | Philip H. Kasper Cheese Factory | | August 27, 1976 (#76000081) | W of Bear Creek on WI 22; 44°31′04″N 88°53′25″W | Bear Creek | Ramshackle 1-story wooden cheese factory built in 1891. A leader in the dairy industry, Kasper attended the UW dairy school in 1894, switched early to pay for milk based on butterfat rather than volume, helped organize the Wisconsin Cheesemakers' Association, and supposedly won more prizes than any other cheesemaker. |
| 14 | Lake Street Historic District | Lake Street Historic District | May 30, 2002 (#02000599) | Roughly bounded S. Washington St., E. Badger St., Fifth St., and Tioga St. 44°21′18″N 89°04′57″W | Waupaca | Mostly-residential district with 71 contributing properties, ranging from Cutting Marsh's 1865 Greek Revival Presbyterian Church to the 1867 Italianate Lea house, the 1890 Queen Anne Scott house, the 1915 American Foursquare/Prairie Style Beardmore house, the 1915 Tudor Revival Peter Hansen house, the 1921 Christofferson Hospital, the 1921 Spanish Colonial Mortenson house, and the 1926 Colonial Revival Godfrey house, |
| 15 | Main Street Historic District | Main Street Historic District | April 12, 2002 (#02000370) | Roughly along S. and N. Main Sts. from W. Union to Granite Sts. 44°21′35″N 89°05′13″W | Waupaca | Commercial district with 43 contributing properties including the 1868 Hansen Wagon Shop mentioned above, the 1877 Italianate-styled Masonic Meeting Hall the 1881 Jensen Meat Market, the 1883 Pinkerton Block which housed Nordvi's General Store the 1893 Queen Anne-styled Waupaca County National Bank, the 1896 Peterson Saloon, and the 1919 Godfrey Auto Company. |
| 16 | Mead Bank | Mead Bank | May 30, 2003 (#03000506) | 215 Jefferson St. 44°21′30″N 89°05′00″W | Waupaca | Small, early bank built around 1862 in Greek Revival style for Henry C. Mead, who was mysteriously murdered there in 1882. |
| 17 | Mumbrue-Penney House | Mumbrue-Penney House | October 4, 2002 (#02001107) | 404 S. Main St. 44°21′24″N 89°05′07″W | Waupaca | 3-story Second Empire house, built in 1873 for Henry Cook Mumbrue, a Waupaca storekeeper, politician, and postmaster. In 1890 Adelbert Penney bought the house. He was called the "potato king" because he owned potato farms and warehouses and helped make Waupaca a potato trading center. |
| 18 | Old Hospital | Old Hospital | June 19, 1985 (#85001365) | Off WI 22; 44°20′08″N 89°08′49″W | King | 2.5-story brick building built in 1929, in Mediterranean Revival style, with orange brick and red roof. Demolished |
| 19 | Peter and Jessie Olfson House | Peter and Jessie Olfson House | October 4, 2002 (#02001082) | 415 Granite St. 44°21′43″N 89°05′28″W | Waupaca | Peter was a Waupaca local who made his fortune trading potatoes starting in 1892. In 1899 he and Jessie built this elaborate Queen Anne home, with stained glass windows and a cast-iron fireplace. |
| 20 | Rural on the Crystal Historic District | Rural on the Crystal Historic District | April 12, 1989 (#89000231) | Roughly bounded by Arbor St., Rapley St., Rural Rd., and Cleghorn St. 44°18′46″N 89°09′27″W | Rural | Community along the Crystal River founded by New-Englanders in the 1850s on the road from Berlin to Stevens Point. Today it remains much as it was when the railroad bypassed it in 1870. |
| 21 | Sanders Site (47WP26 and 47WP70) | Sanders Site (47WP26 and 47WP70) | February 9, 1984 (#84003819) | Address Restricted | Fremont | Site along the Wolf River where Woodland people lived and built effigy mounds from around 600 to 1100 CE. Animal remains at the site indicate that they ate more elk than any other meat, followed by bear and deer. |
| 22 | Shearer-Cristy House | Shearer-Cristy House | December 22, 1983 (#83004364) | 315 E. Lake St. 44°21′10″N 89°04′53″W | Waupaca | Exuberant Queen Anne home built in 1891 from a pattern-book design by George Otis Garnsey. Caleb Shearer, the first owner, ran a local planing mill. Joseph Cristy, who bought the house in 1907, owned a dry goods store. |
| 23 | Veterans Cottages Historic District | Veterans Cottages Historic District | June 19, 1985 (#85001367) | Off WI 22; 44°20′20″N 89°08′39″W | King | The Wisconsin Veteran's Home was founded in 1887 by the GAR to house veterans of the Civil War. It was unusual in that it allowed wives to live with the veterans and provided them individual cottages. In 1929 the state took over the home, and to this day it houses veterans of subsequent wars. |
| 24 | Veterans Home Chapel | Veterans Home Chapel | June 19, 1985 (#85001366) | WI 22 and Grandview; 44°20′14″N 89°08′35″W | King | Wooden church at King Veteran's Home, built in 1890 in Queen Anne style. |
| 25 | Waupaca Free Public Library | Waupaca Free Public Library | June 28, 1996 (#96000732) | 321 S. Main St. 44°21′19″N 89°05′05″W | Waupaca | 1914 Carnegie Library supported by Waupaca women's organizations, designed by Parkinson & Dockendorff in Tudor Revival style with Arts and Crafts influences. |
| 26 | Waupaca Post Office | Waupaca Post Office | October 24, 2000 (#00001252) | 306 S. Main St. 44°21′18″N 89°05′07″W | Waupaca | Neoclassical building built in 1938 with WPA assistance, the first federal post office in Waupaca. |
| 27 | J. & C. Wipf Mills | J. & C. Wipf Mills | December 8, 1987 (#87002108) | 280 N. Main St. 44°30′35″N 89°07′50″W | Iola | 3-story water-powered mill complex begun around 1860 by Swiss immigrant Henry Wipf and his sons Jacob and Conrad. The Wipfs added planing and moulding operations to the original gristmill over the century that they operated the mill. |

== See also ==
- List of National Historic Landmarks in Wisconsin
- National Register of Historic Places listings in Wisconsin
- Listings in neighboring counties: Marathon, Outagamie, Portage, Shawano, Waushara, Winnebago
