= Theodore W. Goldin =

US Army Medal of Honor recipient

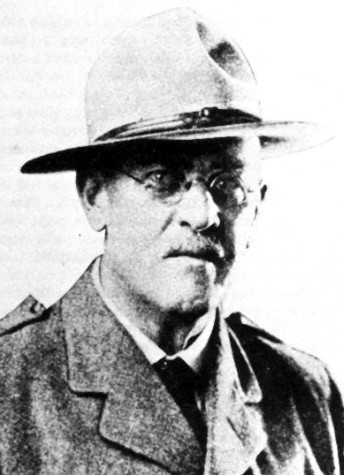
- Theodore W. Goldin, Medal of Honor recipient

Chief Clerk of the Wisconsin Senate
- In office January 1903 – January 1905
- Preceded by: Walter Houser
- Succeeded by: Leo Kimbell Eaton

Personal details
- Born: July 25, 1858 Avon, Wisconsin
- Died: February 15, 1935 (aged 76) King, Waupaca County, Wisconsin, U.S.
- Resting place: Central Wisconsin Veterans Memorial Cemetery, King, Waupaca County, Wisconsin
- Party: Republican
- Spouses: Laura Belle Dunwiddie (m. 1881; died 1911); Sarah J. Murphy (m. 1929–1935)
- Children: Herbert D. Goldin (b. 1884)

Military service
- Allegiance: United States
- Branch/service: United States Army; Wisconsin National Guard
- Years of service: 1876–1877 (USA)
- Rank: Private, USA; Colonel, ARNG
- Unit: 7th Reg. U.S. Cavalry
- Battles/wars: American Indian Wars: Battle of Little Bighorn; Battle of Bear Paw
- Awards: Medal of Honor

Theodore W. Goldin (July 25, 1858 – February 15, 1935) served in the United States Army during the American Indian Wars. He received the Medal of Honor for his actions during the Battle of the Little Bighorn.

== Early and personal life ==
Goldin was adopted as an infant by Reuben W. Goldin and Elizabeth E. Bradfield Goldin of Avon, Wisconsin. His birth name has been lost. When Goldin was four, his family moved to Brodhead, Wisconsin.

Goldin married Laura Belle Dunwiddie in 1881. The couple had one son, Herbert D. Goldin, in 1884. Laura died in 1911, and Goldin married Sarah J. Murphy in 1929.

== Indian Wars ==
Goldin enlisted in the U.S. Army on April 8, 1876, lying about his age. (His year of birth is thus often incorrectly listed as 1855.) He was assigned to the 7th U.S. Cavalry. Less than three months later, Goldin's regiment fought in the Battle of Little Bighorn.

Goldin also took part in the Battle of Bear Paw in September and October 1877. He was discharged from the Army on November 13, 1877 for having enlisted under false pretenses after his parents appealed to the Army for his discharge.

== Post-war career ==
Goldin began studying law in 1881 and was admitted to the bar in 1882. He was elected as clerk of the circuit court of Green County in fall of that year. He served as assistant chief clerk of the Wisconsin State Assembly from 1882 to 1885. He became a Mason in 1883, eventually rising to the 33-degree in 1902. Goldin moved to Janesville in 1885, where he engaged in private practice. In 1889, Goldin was appointed a colonel in the Wisconsin National Guard and served as inspector for rifle practice. From 1894 to 1896 he was president of the Janesville Board of Education, and in 1895-1903 he was clerk of the circuit court for Rock County. From 1903 to 1904, Goldin was chief clerk of the Wisconsin Senate.

Around the start of the 20th century, Goldin served as Chairman of the Republican Party of Wisconsin. In 1904, Goldin sided with the stalwarts in the Republican Party of Wisconsin, a conservative faction led by Senator John Coit Spooner that was opposed to Governor Robert M. La Follette, Sr., running for a third term. The "Spooner Faction", with Goldin as its chairman, was successful in getting their splinter party recognized over the liberal La Follette faction by the Republican National Committee for the 1904 elections. However, when "Fighting Bob" La Follette ended up winning re-election that fall, Goldin's political career in Wisconsin was finished.

Goldin soon after moved to Kansas City, Missouri in 1907, where he worked as a director of the YMCA. He wandered around the southwestern United States, landing in Oklahoma City in 1911 and Colorado and El Paso, Texas in 1912.

He retired to the Masonic Home in Dousman, Wisconsin, in 1924. In 1929, he moved to the Wisconsin Veterans Home in the town of King, Waupaca County, Wisconsin, where he died in 1935.

== Controversy and Honor for the Battle of Little Big Horn ==
Beginning with a letter to the editor published in the Janesville Daily Gazette in 1886, Goldin began to publish his version of the Battle of Little Big Horn in which he castigated Major Marcus Reno and praised Lt. Col. George A. Custer. Goldin claimed that Custer gave him a last message to be carried to Reno shortly before Custer was killed. Goldin also campaigned to be awarded the Medal of Honor for his role in the Battle of Little Big Horn, writing to Captain Frederick Benteen and speaking to Lieutenant Luther Hare in person. In 1896 Joseph Doe, a fellow Wisconsin politician and Mason and Assistant Secretary of War found that there was sufficient evidence for approval of a Medal of Honor for Goldin.

As the years went by, Goldin embellished his role in the battle more and more. In Northwestern Fights and Fighters by Cyrus Townsend Brady, in addition to his claims of carrying Custer's last dispatch, Goldin also claimed that he had joined the Seventh Cavalry in 1873, witnessed the death of Lt. Benjamin Hodgson, and was present for a discussion of strategy between Captain Myles Keogh and Lt. Col. Custer. When others challenged his claims, Goldin alleged that Brady had distorted his letter.

Goldin's embellishments did not stop at his role in the Battle of Little Big Horn. He also added to his own personal biography. In a sketch published in a book about Rock County, he claimed to have been born in 1855, studied at the fictitious Tilton University for four years, and then at age twenty enlisted in the Army, where he served for nearly four years. The book also claims he was wounded twice at the Battle of Little Big Horn and was discharged due to disability.

In 1924, a Missouri congressman helped Goldin obtain a pension as a Medal of Honor recipient through a special act of Congress. In 1927, Goldin was able to change his discharge from "not honorable" to "honorable" with the help of prominent friends.

Goldin was buried in King, Wisconsin.

For some years between 1891 and 1896, Goldin carried on a correspondence with Captain Benteen, and the two became friends. Benteen's letters (but not Goldin's replies, which have not been preserved) were eventually published as the Benteen-Goldin Letters and are one of the few primary sources for Benteen's views on the battle.

== Medal of Honor citation ==
His award citation for his actions in the Battle of Little Big Horn reads:

One of a party of volunteers who, under a heavy fire from the Indians, went for and brought water to the wounded.

== See also ==
- List of Medal of Honor recipients for the Indian Wars

== Bibliography ==
- Cyrus Townsend Brady, "One of the Last Men to See Custer Alive." in Indian Fights and Fighters, pp. 263–278 "theodore+w.+goldin" Indian Fights and Fighters
- Theodore W. Goldin, "The Seventh Cavalry at Canon Creek" in Cyrus Townsend Brady, Northwestern Fights and Fighters. New York: Doubleday, Page & Co., 1909. "theodore+w.+goldin" Northwestern Fights and Fighters
- Larry Sklenar, "Theodore W. Goldin: Little Big Horn Survivor and Winner of the Medal of Honor". Wisconsin Magazine of History, vol. 80, no. 2 (Winter 1996–1997) pp. 106–123. 106

Wisconsin Senate
Preceded by Walter Houser	Chief Clerk of the Wisconsin Senate; January 1903 – January 1905	Succeeded by Leo Kimbell Eaton
