= King, Wisconsin =

King, Wisconsin may refer to:

- King, Lincoln County, Wisconsin, a town in Wisconsin
- King, Waupaca County, Wisconsin, an unincorporated community in Wisconsin
- Chain O' Lakes-King, Wisconsin, a former census-designated place in Wisconsin
