= Chain O' Lakes-King, Wisconsin =

- Former CDP
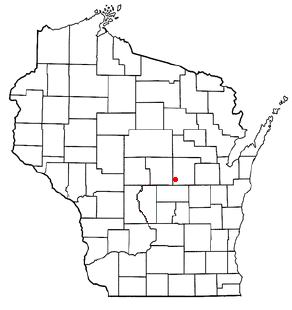
- Location of Chain O' Lakes-King, Wisconsin
- Coordinates: 44°19′50″N 89°9′53″W
- Country: United States
- State: Wisconsin
- County: Waupaca

Area
  - Total: 5.6 sq mi (14.4 km^{2})
  - Land: 4.3 sq mi (11.2 km^{2})
  - Water: 1.2 sq mi (3.2 km^{2})

Population (2000)
  - Total: 2,215
  - Density: 514/sq mi (198.4/km^{2})
- Time zone: UTC-6 (Central (CST))
  - Summer (DST): UTC-5 (CDT)
- FIPS code: 55-13885

Chain O' Lakes-King is a former census-designated place (CDP) in Waupaca County, Wisconsin, United States. The population was 2,215 at the 2000 census. It is located within the towns of Farmington and Dayton. For the 2010 census, Chain O' Lakes-King was split into the CDPs of Chain O' Lakes and King.

== Visitor attractions ==
The CDP is home to the Wisconsin Veterans Home, located in King. Also in the CDP are the Chain O' Lakes, a series of 22 interconnected lakes frequented by tourists. In the Menominee language, the chain of lakes are called Kūwicīqsow-Nepēhsaeh. This name refers to how the shape is like that of the sacred double ball game, a game similar to lacrosse traditionally played by women of the various nations indigenous to Wisconsin.

== Geography ==
Chain O' Lakes-King is located at 44°19′50″N 89°9′53″W (44.330570, -89.164796).

According to the United States Census Bureau, the CDP has a total area of 5.6 square miles (14.4 km^{2}), of which, 4.3 square miles (11.2 km^{2}) of it is land and 1.2 square miles (3.2 km^{2}) of it (22.48%) is water.

== Demographics ==
As of the census of 2000, there were 2,215 people, 623 households, and 439 families residing in the CDP. The population density was 513.8 people per square mile (198.4/km^{2}). There were 1,085 housing units at an average density of 251.7/sq mi (97.2/km^{2}). The racial makeup of the CDP was 98.60% White, 0.09% African American, 0.41% Native American, 0.14% Asian, 0.14% from other races, and 0.63% from two or more races. Hispanic or Latino of any race were 0.50% of the population.

There were 623 households, out of which 23.4% had children under the age of 18 living with them, 60.2% were married couples living together, 5.6% had a female householder with no husband present, and 29.4% were non-families. 23.8% of all households were made up of individuals, and 9.1% had someone living alone who was 65 years of age or older. The average household size was 2.29 and the average family size was 2.67.

In the CDP, the population was spread out, with 13.2% under the age of 18, 4.3% from 18 to 24, 15.3% from 25 to 44, 24.2% from 45 to 64, and 43.0% who were 65 years of age or older. The median age was 59 years. For every 100 females, there were 147.8 males. For every 100 females age 18 and over, there were 154.7 males.

The median income for a household in the CDP was $44,327, and the median income for a family was $57,991. Males had a median income of $41,027 versus $25,268 for females. The per capita income for the CDP was $23,490. About 3.9% of families and 3.7% of the population were below the poverty line, including 4.0% of those under age 18 and none of those age 65 or over.

== See also ==
- Chain O' Lakes, Wisconsin
- King, Waupaca County, Wisconsin
