= Mumbrue-Penney House =

- U.S. National Register of Historic Places
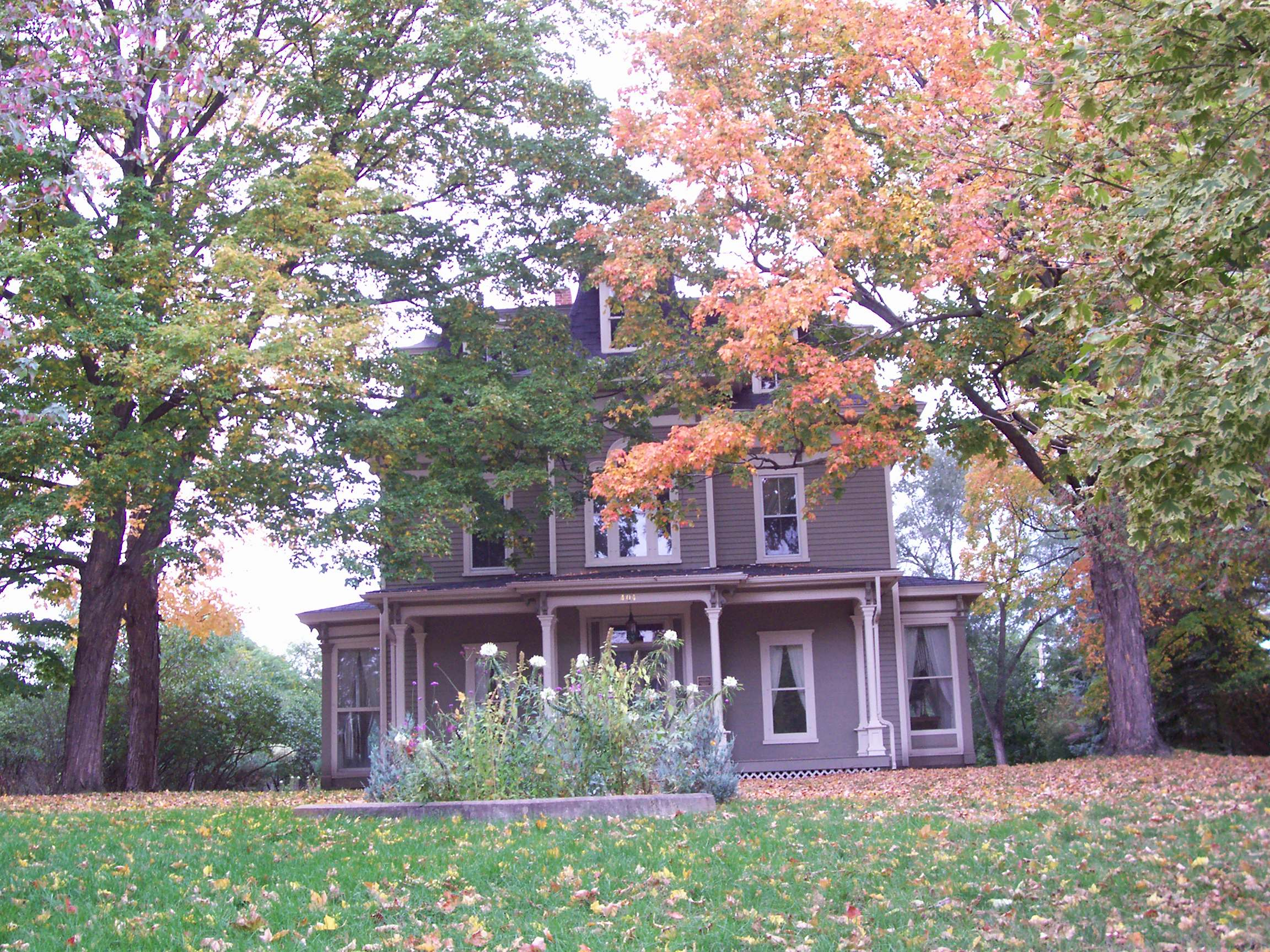
- Location: 404 S. Main St., Waupaca, Wisconsin
- Coordinates: 44.35446°N 89.08544°W
- Area: Less than one acre
- Built: 1873
- Architectural style: Second Empire
- NRHP reference No.: 02001087
- Added to NRHP: October 4, 2002

The Mumbrue-Penney House is an historic residence located at 404 South Main Street in Waupaca, Wisconsin. Built in 1893, the house is a well-preserved example of the Second Empire architectural style. It was added to the National Register of Historic Places in 2002.

== History ==
The house was built by Henry Cook Mumbrue, a New York native who moved to Wisconsin in 1849. Mumbrue was active in various industries, including steamboating, farming, milling, and retail. He also held several public offices, serving in the Wisconsin State Assembly in 1876 and the Wisconsin State Senate from 1877 to 1878. In 1893, he was appointed postmaster of Waupaca, a role he maintained until his death in 1898.

In 1890, the home was sold to Adelbert M. Penney, another New York native who became a leader in Waupaca’s burgeoning potato industry. Known as the “potato king,” Penney helped transform the city into a key hub for potato trading through establishing warehouses, a starch factory, and large-scale potato farming.

== Architecture ==
The Mumbrue-Penney House is a three-story building featuring hallmark traits of the Second Empire style, including a distinctive mansard roof with dormer windows. A central tower with a tall Palladian-style window dominates the front façade. Other key features include decorative brackets beneath wide overhanging eaves, projecting one-story bays on both the north and south sides, and a front porch supported by narrow square posts with ornate brackets.

The interior still contains many original features, such as wide molded baseboards, fluted window and door casings with pyramidal corner blocks, and plaster ceiling medallions in the parlors. The first floor features maple flooring and ceilings over ten feet high. An unfinished attic on the third floor, accessible by the main staircase, reveals the structural details of the mansard roof.

== Significance ==
The home is architecturally significant as a rare and well-preserved local example of Second Empire residential design. Its association with Henry Mumbrue and Adelbert Penney adds further historical value. It was listed on the National Register of Historic Places on October 4, 2002, and on the Wisconsin State Register of Historic Places earlier that year, on April 12, 2002.

== See also ==
- Henry Mumbrue
- National Register of Historic Places listings in Waupaca County, Wisconsin
- Second Empire architecture in the United States and Canada
