= Wisconsin Veterans Home =

Site map

The Wisconsin Veterans' Home, in King Wisconsin, is an old soldiers' home in Waupaca County, Wisconsin on the scenic Chain O' Lakes, Wisconsin.

The American Civil War saw significant advances in battlefield medicine. The lower mortality rate of injured soldiers led to the sentiment that the United States should provide care for its surviving injured veterans. The city of Waupaca purchased the land and buildings of the defunct Greenwood Park Hotel and donated the grounds to the Grand Army of the Republic (GAR) for the site of a veterans' home.

Civil War physician and GAR member Dr. Frederick Marden was chosen to head a five-member committee to organize a Wisconsin veterans' home. Among Dr. Marden's innovative ideas put into action was the practice of allowing wives and widows of veterans to live at the home, as well as the idea of allowing members to live semi-independently in cottages. Marden died on September 24, 1887, a year before the site began operation on August 18, 1888.

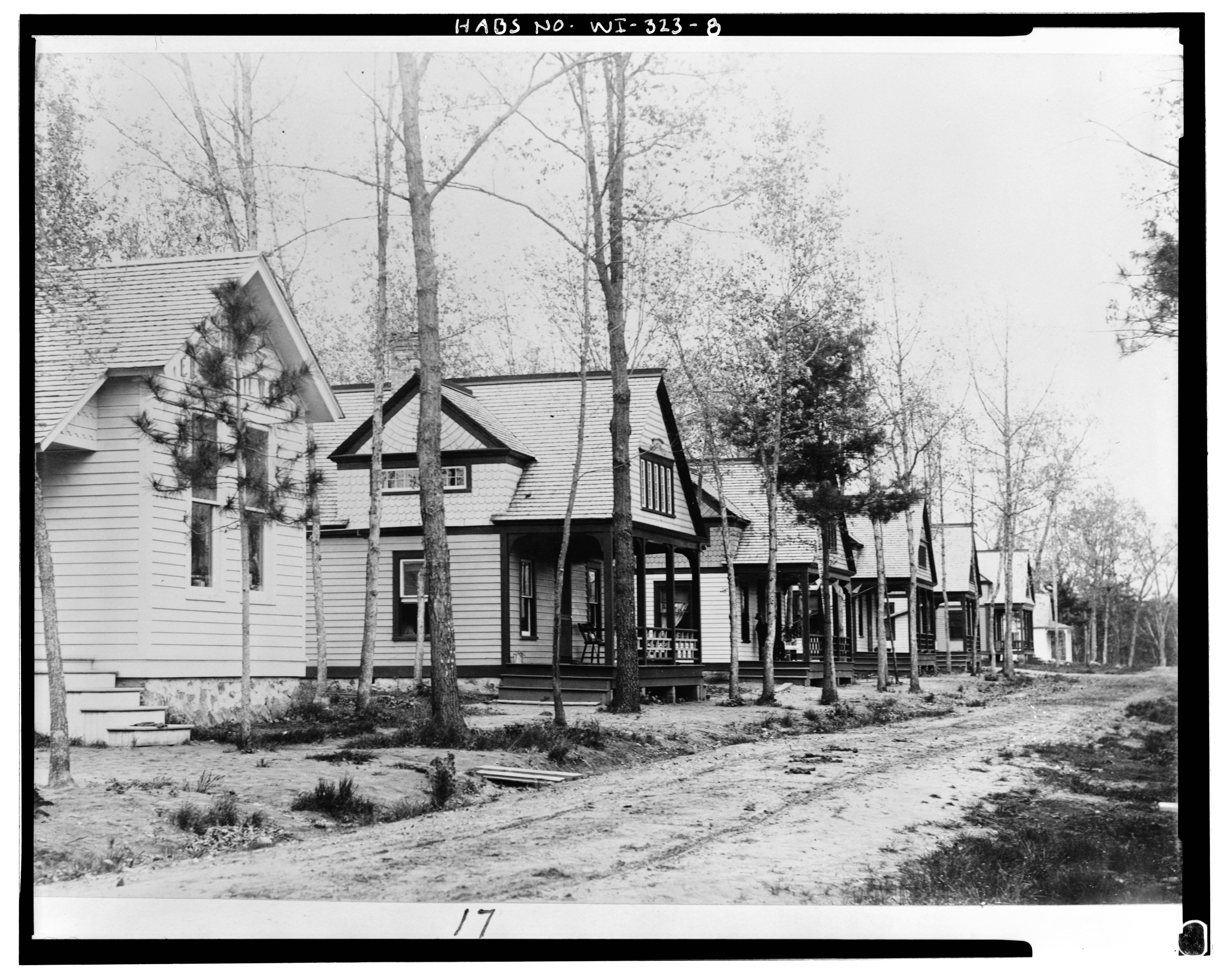
Seven cottages, photographed in 1933

At its peak, King was one of the largest veterans home facilities in the country with a staff of nearly 1,000 workers and included many self-contained community services, including its own fire department. However, by the early 2020's the facility had cut employment to 500 total staff, discontinued admitting new retirement cottage residents, disbanded the fire department and consolidated a number of higher acuity units.

== Historic Buildings ==
There are five U.S. Registered Historic Places in King Veterans Home: Commandant's Residence Home, Halfway House (King, Wisconsin), Old Hospital, Veterans Cottages Historic District, and Veterans Home Chapel.

== Controversy ==
In 2016 controversy erupted over the quality of care delivered at the home, chronic staffing shortages and the practice by the state government of redirecting millions of dollars of federal government funding intended for King into other veterans' programs.

== See also ==
- Jonathan Letterman
