= Shearer-Cristy House =

- U.S. National Register of Historic Places
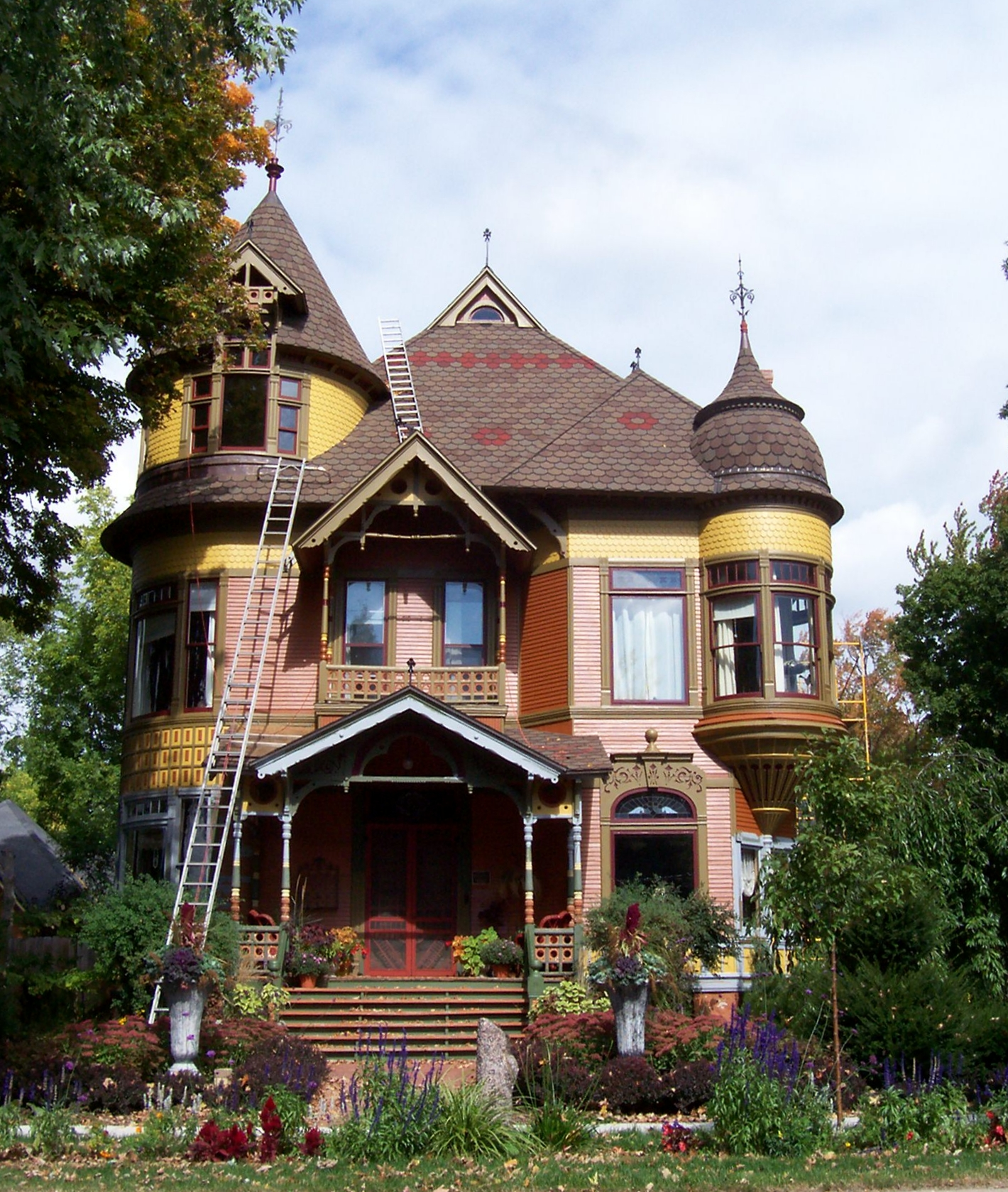
- Front of house in 2008

- Location within Wisconsin Location within the United States
- Location: 315 East Lake Street, Waupaca, Wisconsin
- Coordinates: 44°21′10″N 89°4′53″W
- Architectural style: Queen Anne
- NRHP reference No.: 83004338
- Added to NRHP: December 22, 1983

Shearer-Cristy House is a historic Queen Anne-style residence located at 315 East Lake Street in Waupaca, Wisconsin. Constructed between 1891 and 1892, it is considered one of the most elaborate and well-preserved examples of Queen Anne architecture in the state. The house was added to the National Register of Historic Places in 1983.

== History ==
The house was originally built for Caleb Shearer, a prominent local lumberman and owner of the Eagle Planing Mill. Shearer also served as mayor of Waupaca from 1892-93. Due to financial difficulties, he left Waupaca in 1898, and the house remained vacant until 1907, when it was purchased by Joseph Cristy, a local dry goods merchant. The Cristy family resided in the home for three generations, from 1907 to 1977.

== Architecture ==
Designed by Chicago architect George Otis Garnsey, the Shearer-Cristy House is based on a pattern published in the May 1885 issue of The National Builder, a trade journal edited by Garnsey himself. The three-story house features an asymmetrical floor plan and is adorned with elaborate details characteristic of the Queen Anne style.

Notable architectural features include:

- A three-story circular tower on the west side with an ornate gabled hood.
- A turret on the eastern corner capped with a two-stage onion-dome roof and a fleur-de-lis finial.
- Exterior finishes of clapboard, wood shingles, applied stickwork, decorative bargeboards, and blocked wooden panels.
- A steeply pitched cross-gable roof with gable, tower, and oriel projections.
- Balconettes on the second story and a porch featuring turned posts, a frieze, and a balustrade with a cutout pattern.
- Interior elements such as a grand staircase with carved newel posts, paneled walls, and a balustrade repeating the exterior circle-in-square motif.

The property also includes a matching carriage barn to the south, considered significant to the site's historic value.

== Preservation ==
The house underwent a full restoration beginning in 1994, aiming to preserve its historical integrity. The restoration included renewing the original exterior paint scheme and maintaining the elaborate woodwork and architectural details.

== Recognition ==
The Shearer-Cristy House was listed on the National Register of Historic Places on December 22, 1983, and on the State Register of Historic Places on January 1, 1989.
