= Chain O' Lakes, Wisconsin =

Census-designated place in Wisconsin, United States

- Census-designated place
- Location within Wisconsin
- Coordinates: 44°19′45″N 89°10′12″W
- Country: United States
- State: Wisconsin
- County: Waupaca

Area
  - Total: 4.594 sq mi (11.90 km^{2})
  - Land: 3.407 sq mi (8.82 km^{2})
  - Water: 1.187 sq mi (3.07 km^{2})
- Elevation: 915 ft (279 m)

Population (2020)
  - Total: 1,124
  - Density: 329.9/sq mi (127.4/km^{2})
- Time zone: UTC-6 (Central (CST))
  - Summer (DST): UTC-5 (CDT)
- Area code: 920
- GNIS feature ID: 2399760

Chain O' Lakes is a census-designated place in the towns of Farmington and Dayton, Waupaca County, Wisconsin, United States. As of the 2020 census, Chain O' Lakes had a population of 1,124. Before 2010, it was part of the Chain O' Lakes-King CDP. It consists of twenty-two lakes connected by channels, natural openings, and creeks. In the Menominee language, the chain of lakes are called Sīsepikamiw. This name literally means "Sprawling water, like an animal basking in the sun".
