= Hartman Creek State Park =

State Park in Waupaca County, Wisconsin

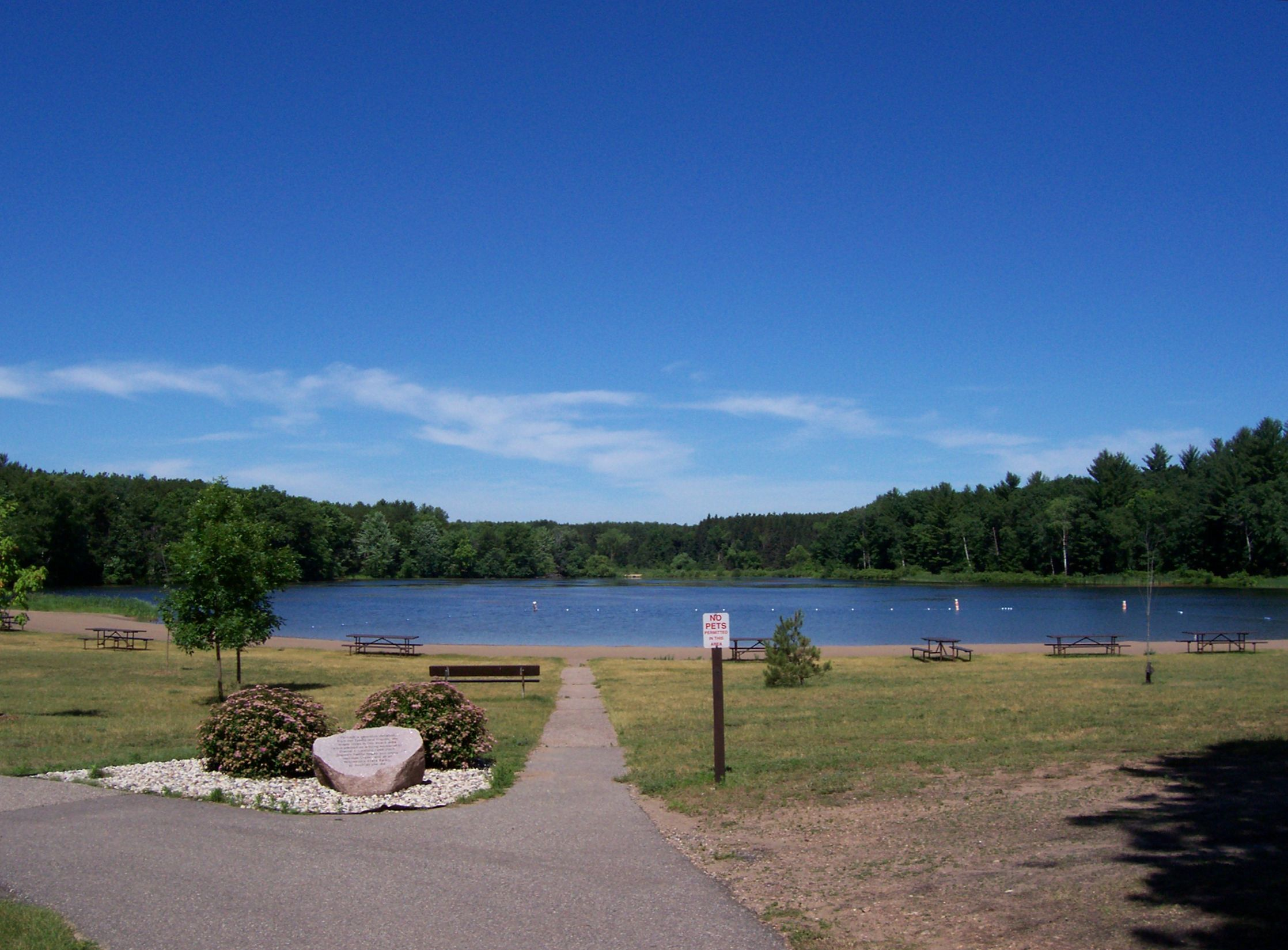
- Hartman Lake

- Location within Wisconsin Location within the United States
- Interactive map of Hartman Creek State Park
- Location: Portage and Waupaca counties, Wisconsin, United States
- Coordinates: 44°19′24″N 89°13′02″W
- Area: 1,417 acres (573 ha)
- Elevation: 912 ft (278 m)
- Established: 1962
- Administrator: Wisconsin Department of Natural Resources
- Website: Official website
- Wisconsin State Parks

Hartman Creek State Park is a 1,417-acre (573 ha) Wisconsin state park near Waupaca, Wisconsin, United States. The park contains several small lakes. Recreational features include 12 miles of off-road biking trails, 10 miles of hiking trails which include a section of the Ice Age National Scenic Trail, 7 miles of bridal trails, 300-foot sand beach, and campsites in an old apple orchard.
