= Farmington, Waupaca County, Wisconsin =

Farmington, Wisconsin
- Town
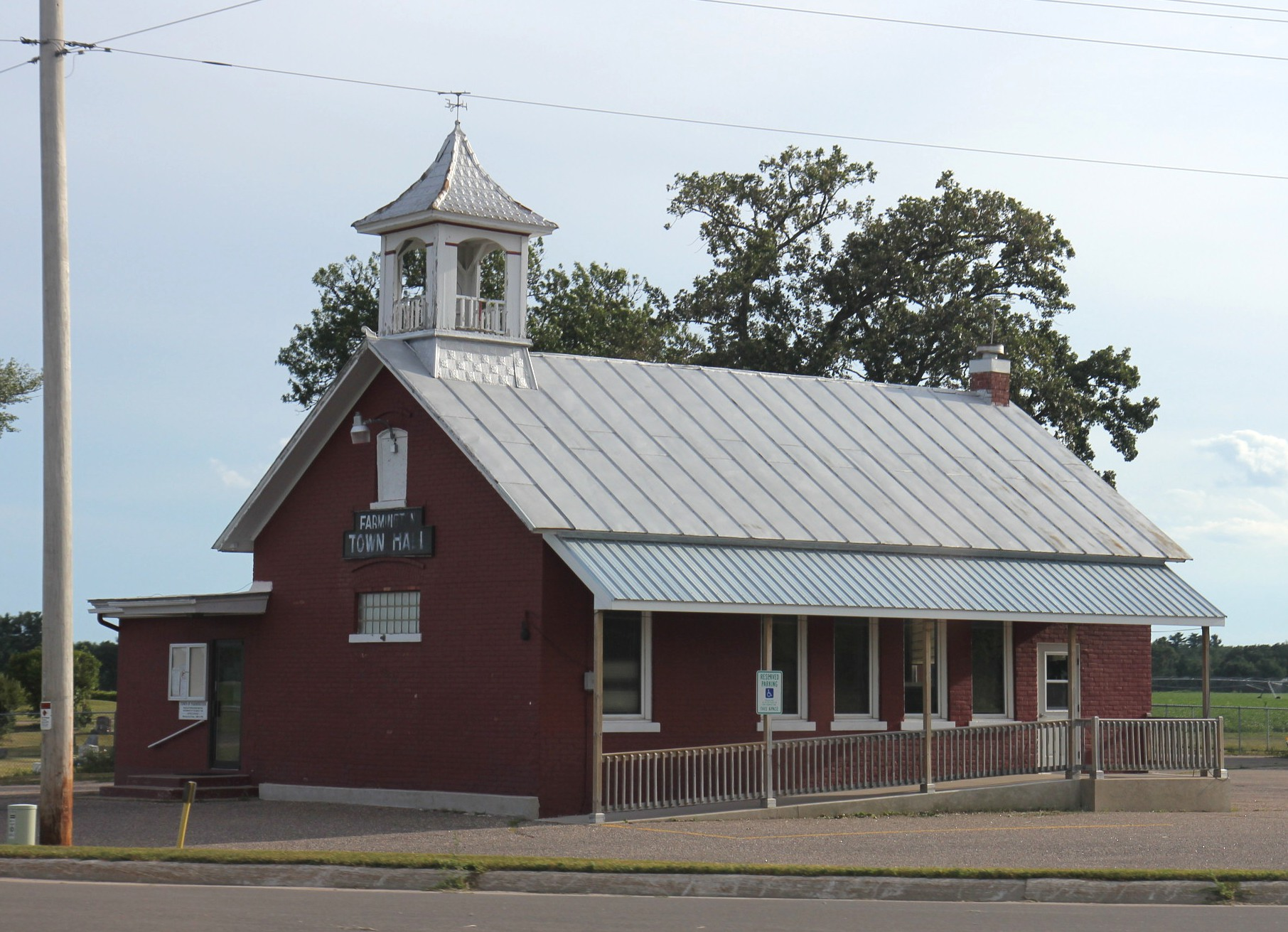
- Town hall

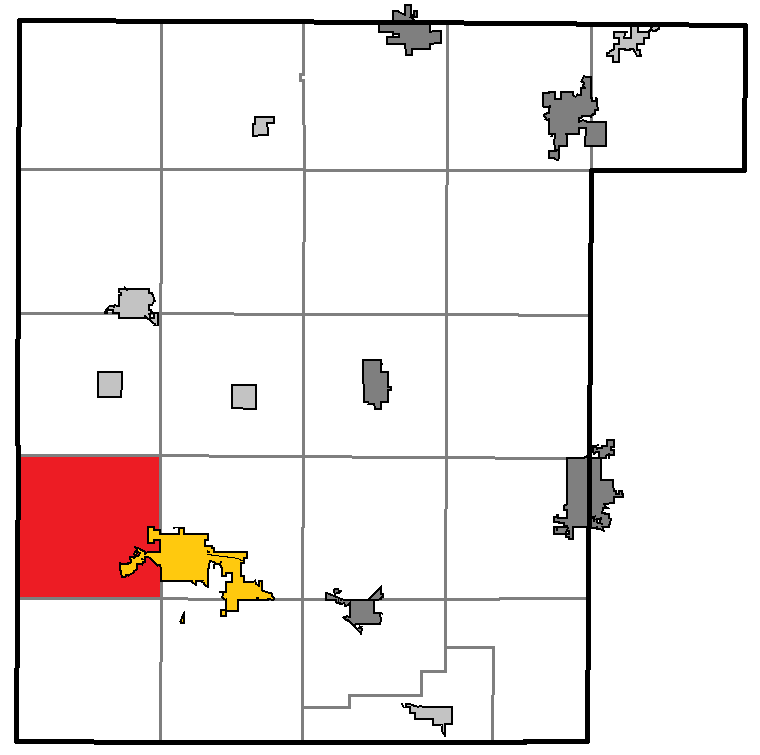
- Location of Farmington, within Waupaca County
- Coordinates: 44°21′34″N 89°9′46″W
- Country: United States
- State: Wisconsin
- County: Waupaca

Area
  - Total: 35.5 sq mi (91.9 km^{2})
  - Land: 34.5 sq mi (89.3 km^{2})
  - Water: 1.0 sq mi (2.6 km^{2})
- Elevation: 915 ft (279 m)

Population (2020)
  - Total: 3,712
  - Density: 108/sq mi (41.6/km^{2})
- Time zone: UTC-6 (Central (CST))
  - Summer (DST): UTC-5 (CDT)
- FIPS code: 55-25400
- GNIS feature ID: 1583194
- Website: https://farmingtonwaup.gov/

Farmington is a town in Waupaca County, Wisconsin, United States. The population was 3,712 at the 2020 census. The town includes the census-designated place known as King, and the unincorporated communities of Cobb Town, and Sheridan. The census-designated place of Chain O' Lakes is also located partially in the town.

== Geography ==
According to the United States Census Bureau, the town has a total area of 35.5 square miles (91.8 km^{2}), of which 34.5 square miles (89.3 km^{2}) is land and 1.0 square mile (2.6 km^{2}) (2.79%) is water.

== Demographics ==
As of the census of 2000, there were 4,148 people, 1,326 households, and 1,021 families residing in the town. The population density was 120.3 people per square mile (46.5/km^{2}). There were 1,637 housing units at an average density of 47.5 per square mile (18.3/km^{2}). The racial makeup of the town was 98.55% White, 0.05% African American, 0.17% Native American, 0.14% Asian, 0.02% Pacific Islander, 0.41% from other races, and 0.65% from two or more races. Hispanic or Latino of any race were 0.80% of the population.

There were 1,326 households, out of which 33.0% had children under the age of 18 living with them, 67.0% were married couples living together, 6.4% had a female householder with no husband present, and 23.0% were non-families. 19.2% of all households were made up of individuals, and 6.7% had someone living alone who was 65 years of age or older. The average household size was 2.53 and the average family size was 2.88.

In the town, the population was spread out, with 20.7% under the age of 18, 4.5% from 18 to 24, 23.1% from 25 to 44, 24.8% from 45 to 64, and 26.9% who were 65 years of age or older. The median age was 46 years. For every 100 females, there were 126.5 males. For every 100 females age 18 and over, there were 127.9 males.

The median income for a household in the town was $46,633, and the median income for a family was $54,180. Males had a median income of $41,118 versus $21,734 for females. The per capita income for the town was $20,044. About 6.8% of families and 8.1% of the population were below the poverty line, including 13.1% of those under age 18 and 3.1% of those age 65 or over.
