= Veterans Home Chapel =

- U.S. National Register of Historic Places
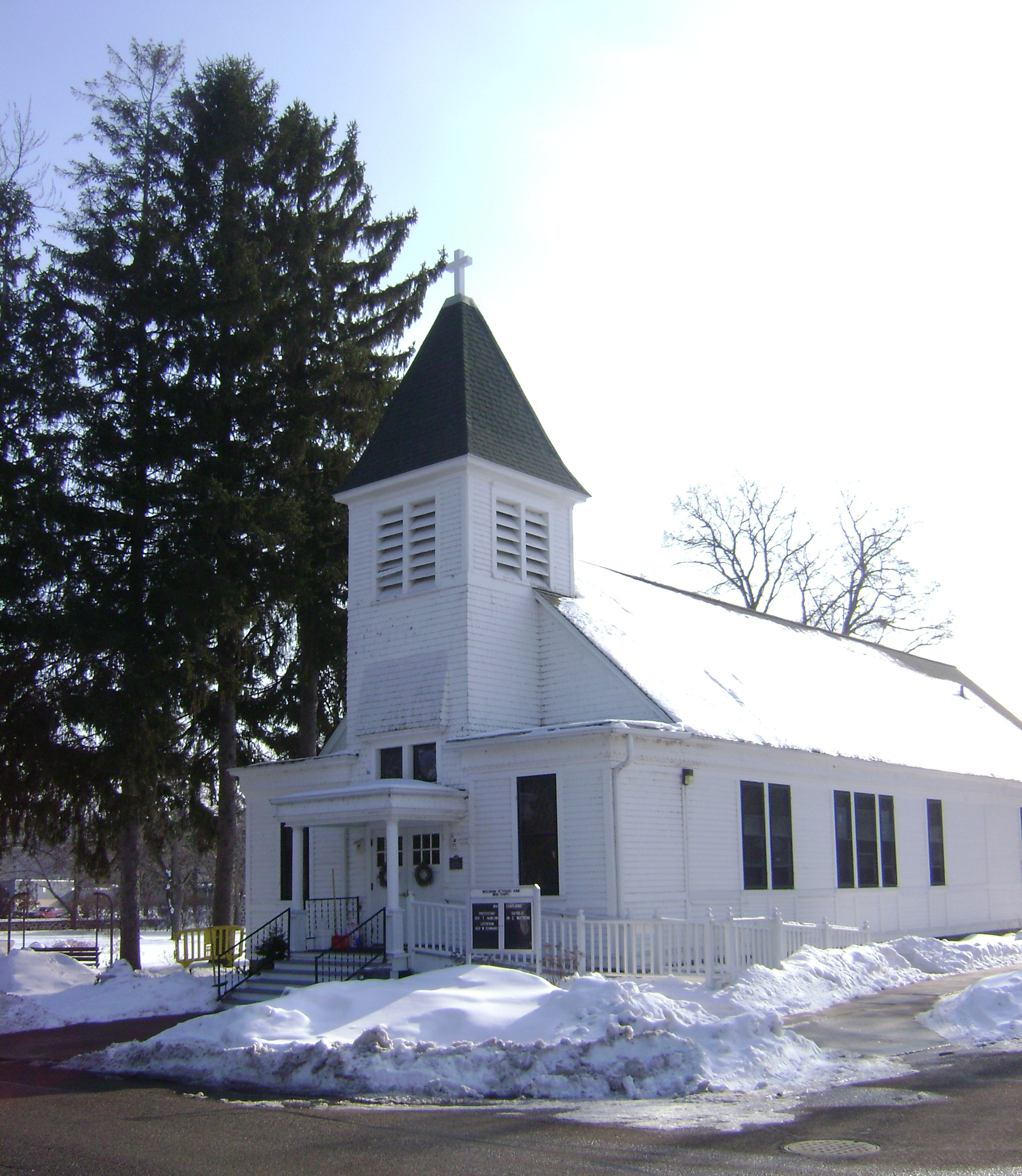
- Veterans Home Chapel
- Location: N2665 County Road QQ; King, Waupaca County, Wisconsin
- Coordinates: 44.33723°N 89.14334°W
- Architectural style: Queen Anne
- NRHP reference No.: 85001366
- Added to NRHP: June 19, 1985

The Veterans Home Chapel is located in King, Waupaca County, Wisconsin on the grounds of the Wisconsin Veterans Home. It was added to the National Register of Historic Places in 1985.

== History ==
The chapel was established by the Grand Army of the Republic. It is part of the Wisconsin Veterans Home complex and is in the Veterans Cottages Historic District.
