= Veterans Cottages Historic District =

Historic district in Wisconsin, United States

Coordinates: 44.33887°N 89.14479°W

- U.S. National Register of Historic Places
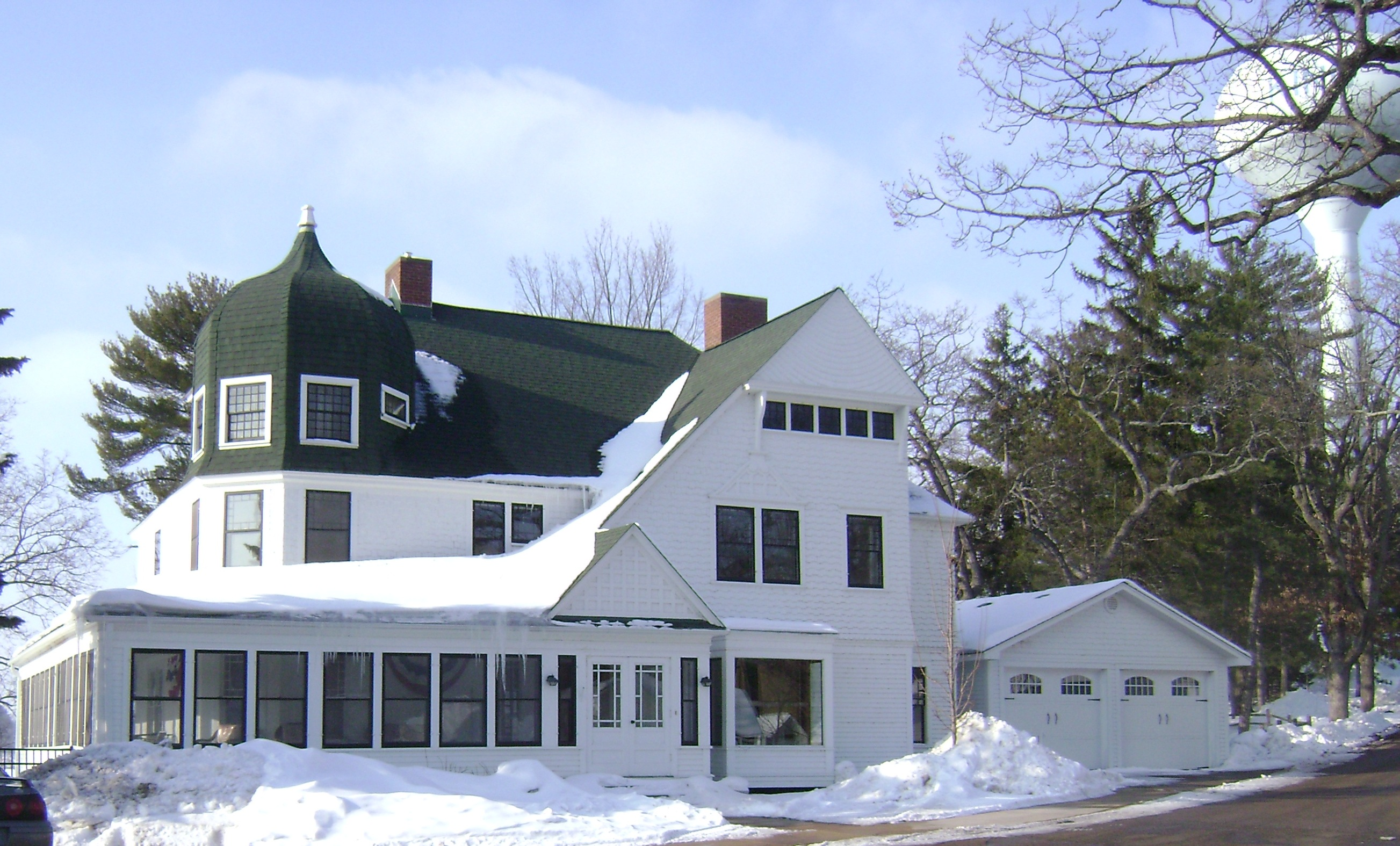
- A portion of the district.
- Location: Off WI 22, King, Waupaca County, Wisconsin
- Area: 5 acres (2.0 ha)
- MPS: Wisconsin Home for Veterans TR
- NRHP reference No.: 85001367
- Added to NRHP: June 19, 1985

The Veterans Cottages Historic District is located in King, Waupaca County, Wisconsin.

== History ==
The cottages were built after the Grand Army of the Republic decided to make homes where war veterans and their wives could live together, an unusual step for the time, now known as the Wisconsin Veterans Home. In 1929, the state took control of the site and has since continued to use it for veterans' housing.

The district was listed on the National Register of Historic Places in 1985 and on the State Register of Historic Places in 1989. The Commandant's Residence Home and the Veterans Home Chapel are located in the district.
