= Main Street Historic District (Waupaca, Wisconsin) =

Historic district in Wisconsin, United States

- U.S. National Register of Historic Places
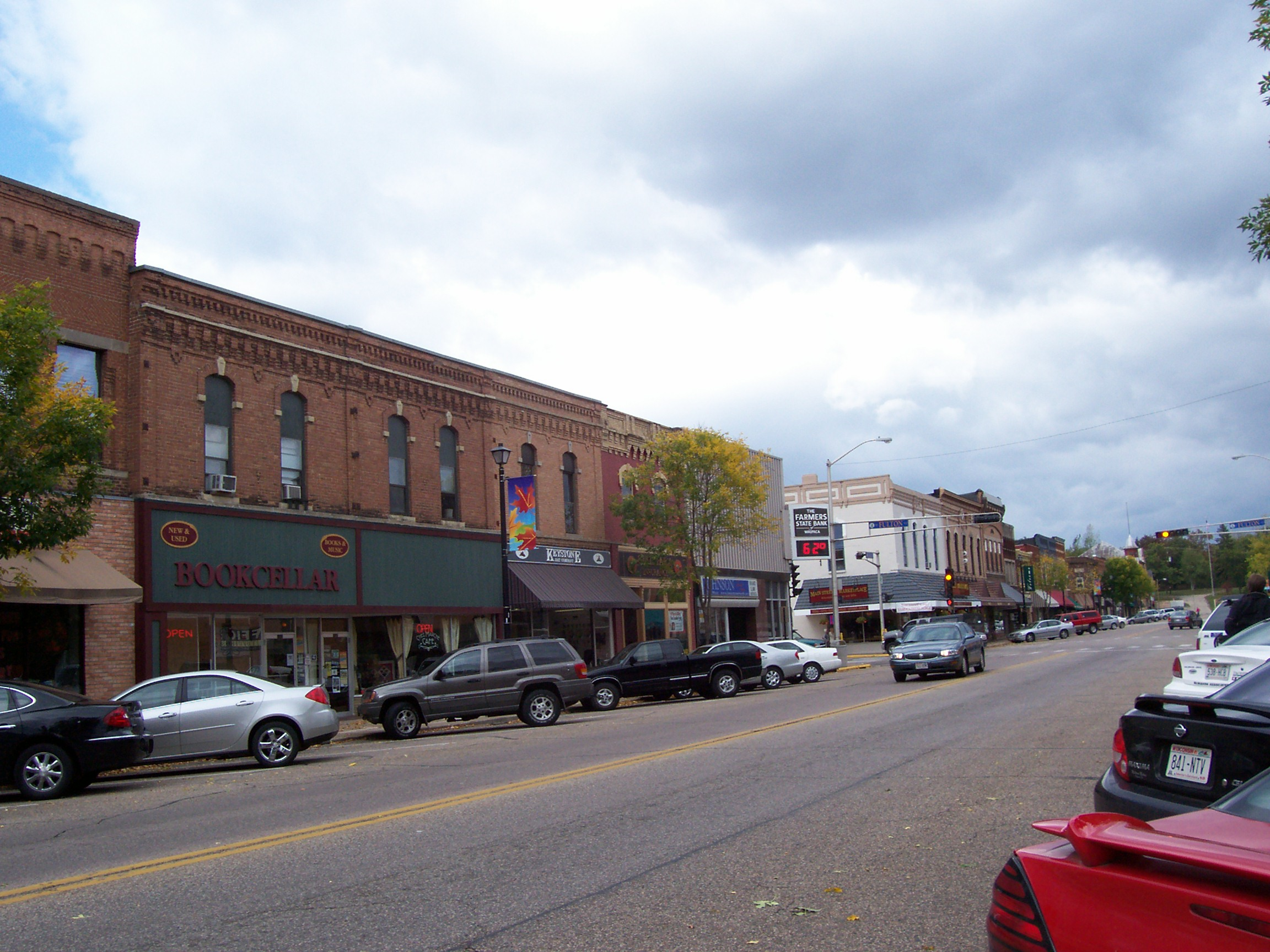
- A portion of the district.
- Location: Roughly along S. and N. Main Sts. from W. Union to Granite Sts., Waupaca, Wisconsin
- Area: 4.5 acres (1.8 ha)
- NRHP reference No.: 02000370
- Added to NRHP: April 12, 2002

The Main Street Historic District is located in Waupaca, Wisconsin.

== Description ==
The district is a commercial one with 43 contributing properties including the 1868 Hansen Wagon Shop mentioned above, the 1877 Italianate-styled Masonic Meeting Hall the 1881 Jensen Meat Market, the 1883 Pinkerton Block which housed Nordvi's General Store the 1893 Queen Anne-styled Waupaca County National Bank, the 1896 Peterson Saloon, and the 1919 Godfrey Auto Company.

It was added to the State and the National Register of Historic Places in 2002.
