= Commandant's Residence Home =

Historic house in Wisconsin, United States

- U.S. National Register of Historic Places
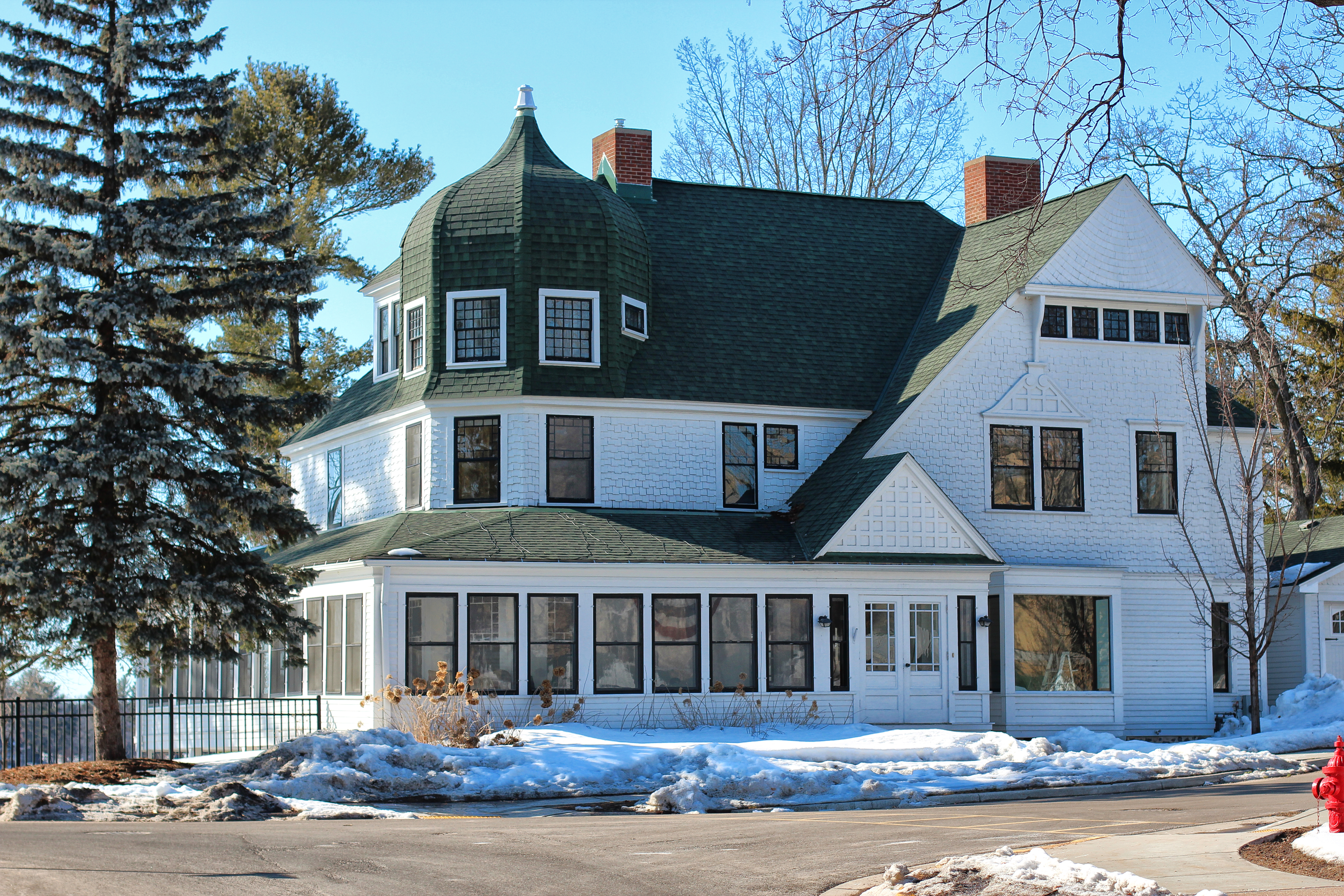
- Commandant's Residence Home
- Location: Off WI 22, King, Waupaca County, Wisconsin
- Coordinates: 44°20′17″N 89°08′43″W
- Area: less than one acre
- Built: 1888
- Architect: William Waters
- Architectural style: Queen Anne
- MPS: Wisconsin Home for Veterans TR
- NRHP reference No.: 85001364
- Added to NRHP: June 19, 1985

The Commandant's Residence Home is located in King, Waupaca County, Wisconsin.

== History ==
The construction of the house was commissioned by the Grand Army of the Republic to house veterans. It was listed on the National Register of Historic Places in 1985 and on the State Register of Historic Places in 1989.

It is located in the Veterans Cottages Historic District.
