= King, Waupaca County, Wisconsin =

Census-designated place in Wisconsin, United States

King, Wisconsin
- Census-designated place
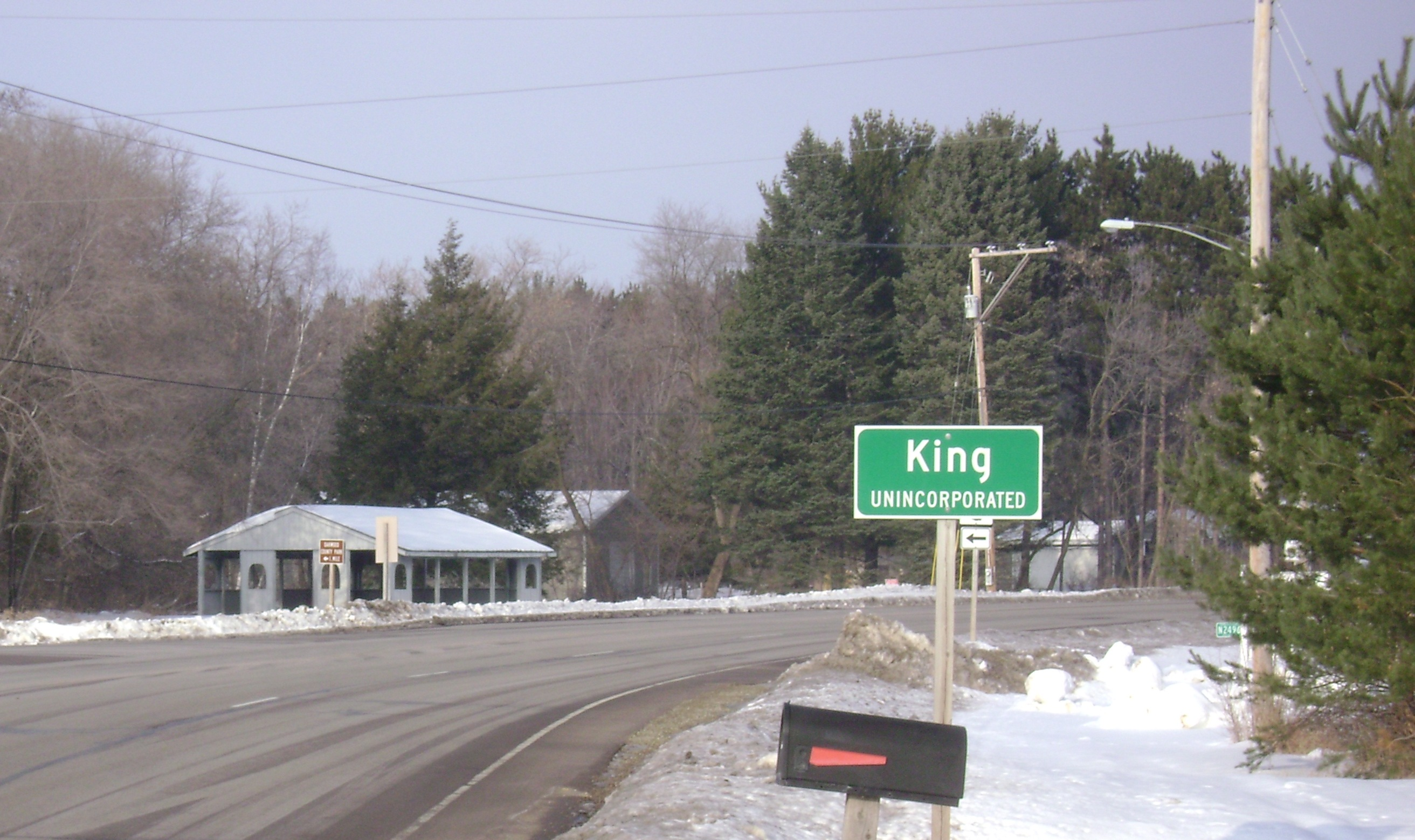

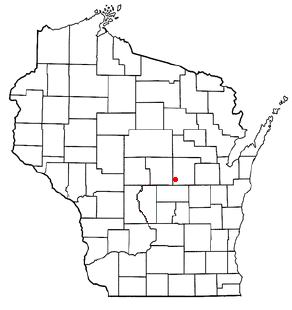
- Location of King, Wisconsin
- Coordinates: 44°20′15″N 89°08′30″W
- Country: United States
- State: Wisconsin
- County: Waupaca

Area
  - Total: 2.326 sq mi (6.02 km^{2})
  - Land: 2.158 sq mi (5.59 km^{2})
  - Water: 0.168 sq mi (0.44 km^{2})

Population (2020)
  - Total: 1,242
  - Density: 575.5/sq mi (222.2/km^{2})
- Time zone: UTC-6 (Central (CST))
  - Summer (DST): UTC-5 (CDT)
- FIPS code: 55-13885
- GNIS feature ID: 1567492

King is a census-designated place in Town of Farmington, Waupaca County, Wisconsin, United States. As of the 2010 census, it had a population of 1,750. Before 2010, it was part of the Chain O' Lakes-King, Wisconsin CDP.

== History ==
In 1887, the area was selected by the Grand Army of the Republic for the site of a veterans' home. The Soldiers' Home was later renamed the Wisconsin Veterans Home. The community is named for General Charles King, a Wisconsin soldier and head of the state's National Guard.

== Images ==
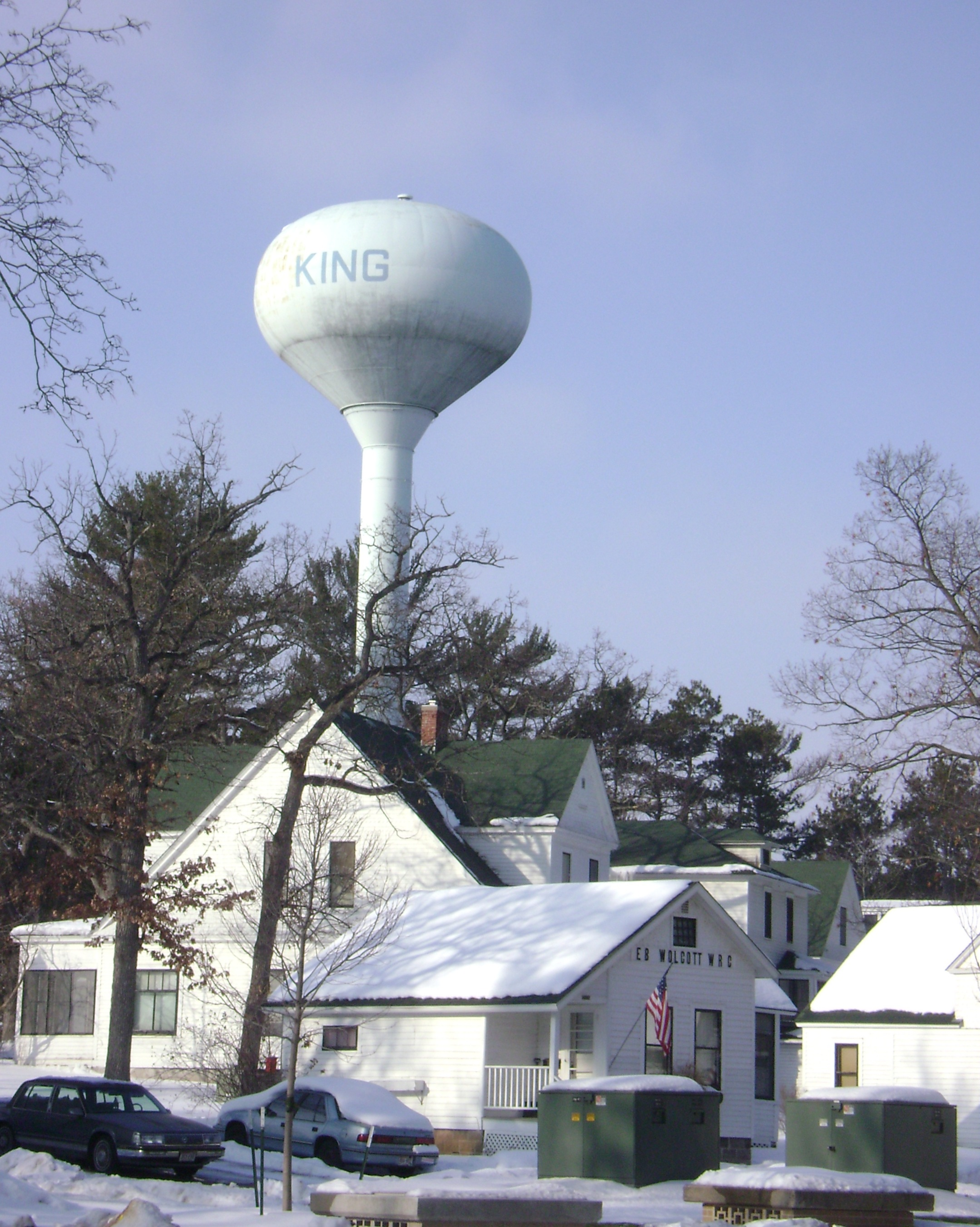
King water tower overlooking the Veterans Cottages Historic District

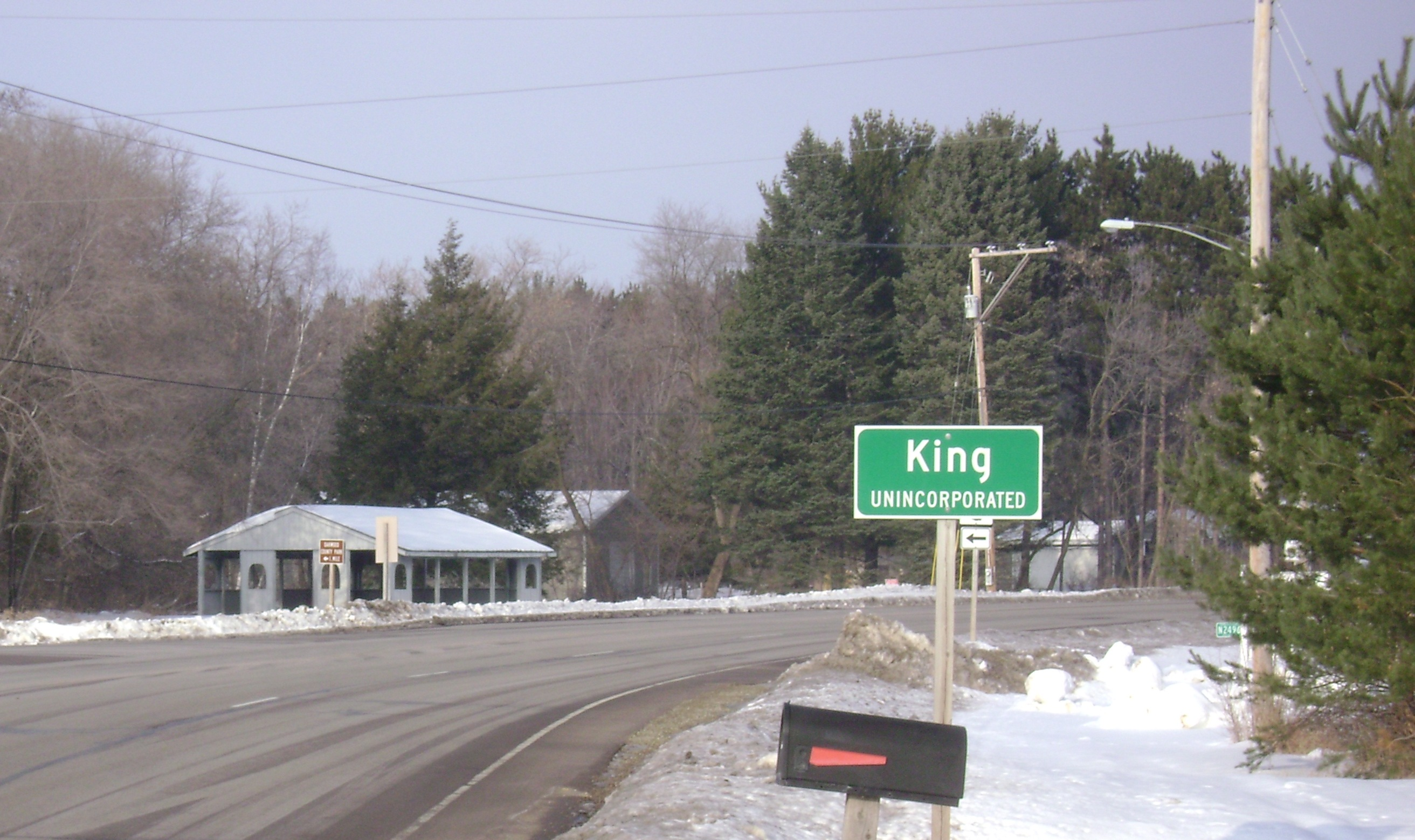
Highway sign for King along Wisconsin Highway 22

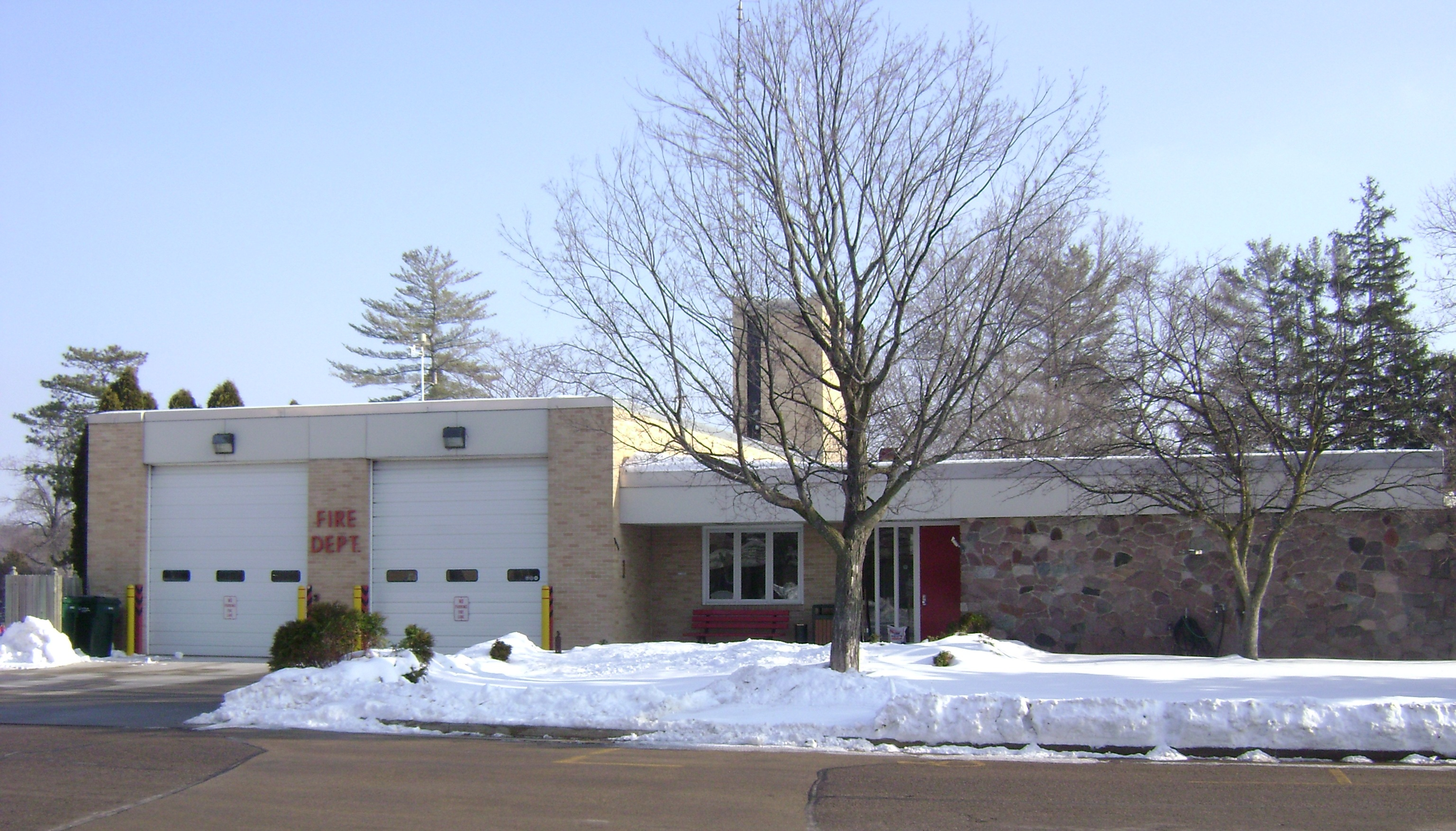
King Fire Department

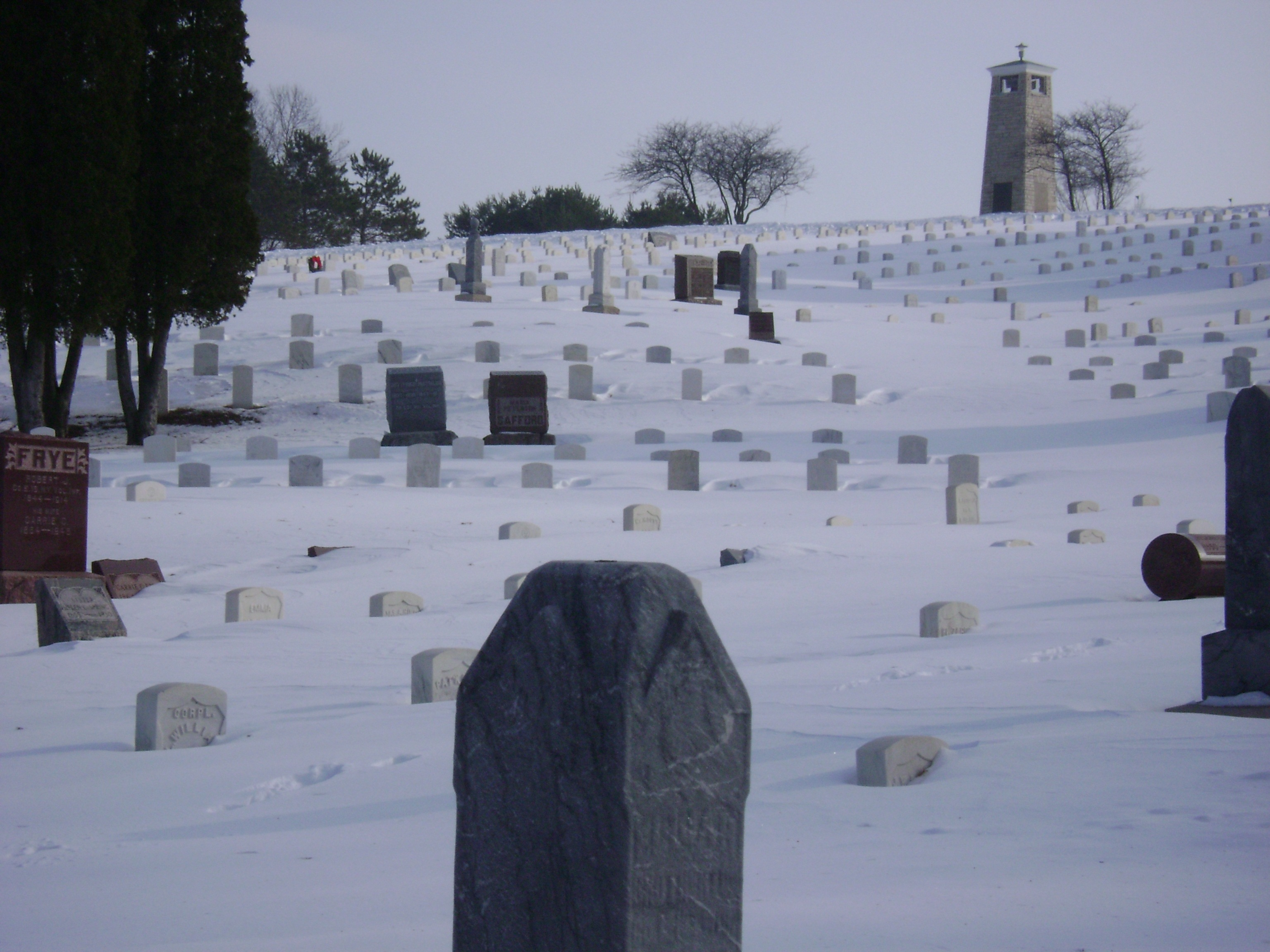
Wisconsin Veterans Memorial Cemetery

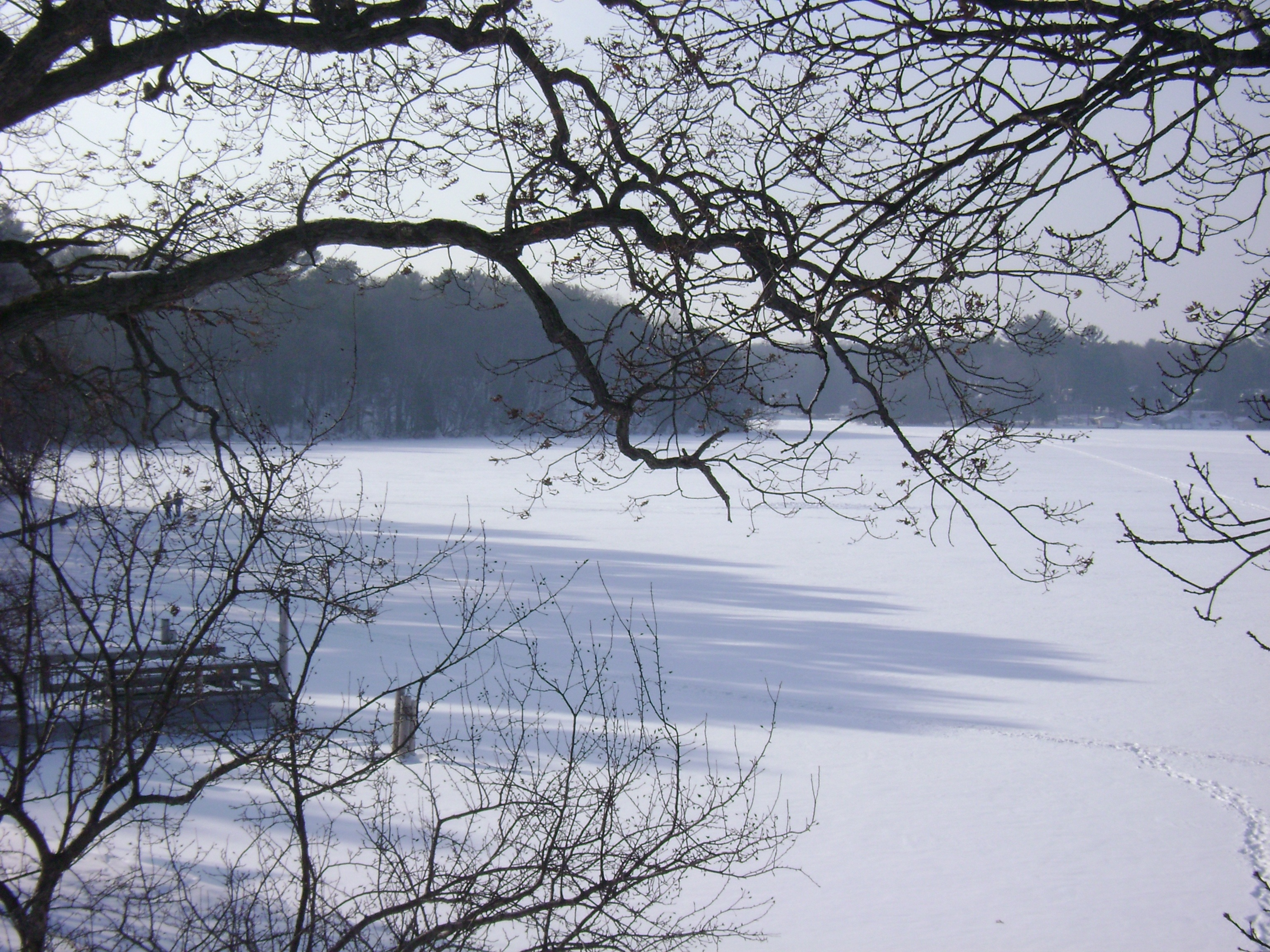
Rainbow Lake as seen from the Wisconsin Veterans Home

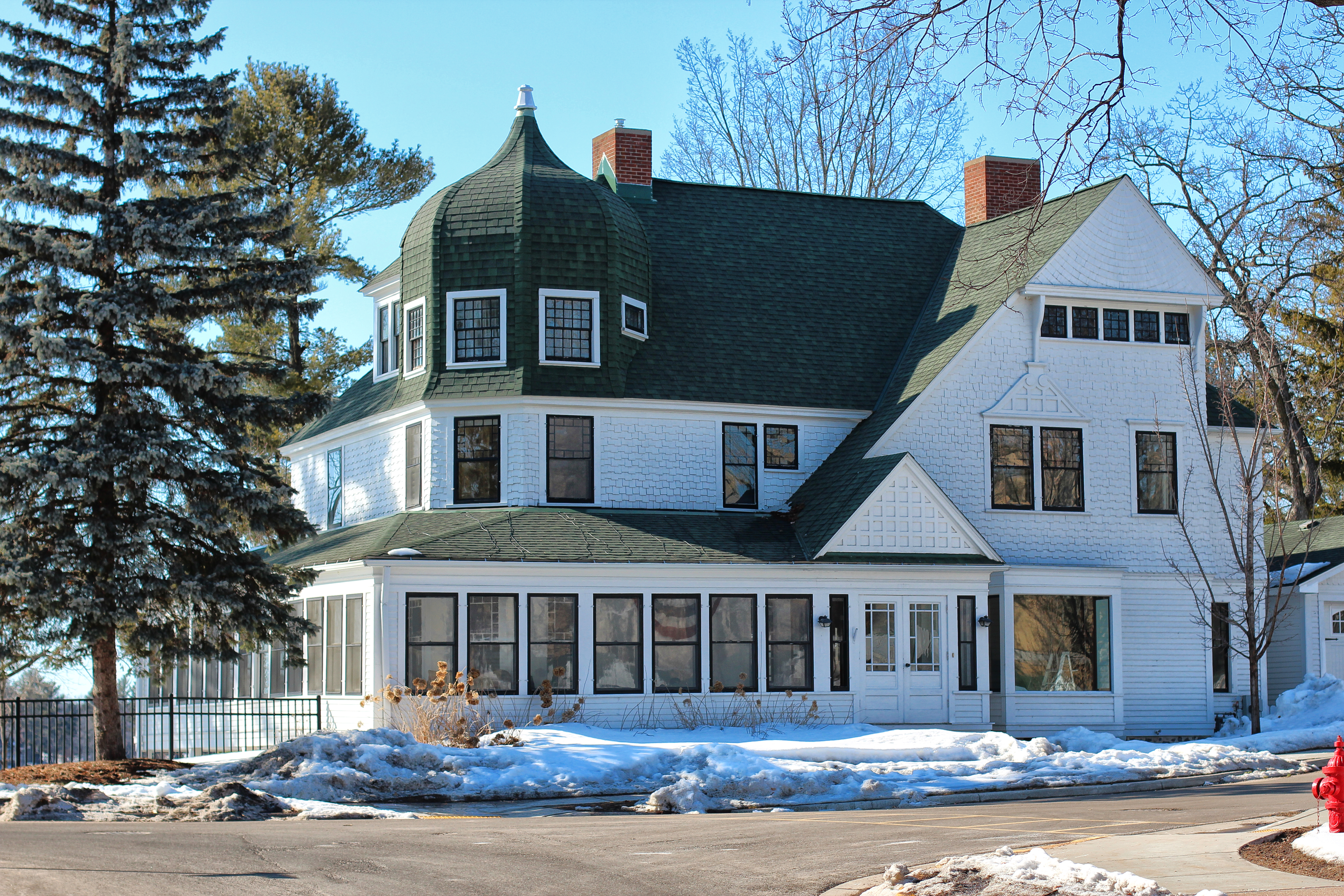
Commandant's Residence Home
